= Deaths in July 2014 =

The following is a list of notable deaths in July 2014.

Entries for each day are listed alphabetically by surname. A typical entry lists information in the following sequence:

- Name, age, country of citizenship and reason for notability, established cause of death, reference.

== July 2014 ==
=== 1 ===
- Satya Rani Chadha, 84–85, Indian human rights activist.
- Betty Cody, 92, Canadian-born American country music singer.
- Umaru Dikko, 77, Nigerian politician, Minister of Transportation (1979–1983), multiple strokes.
- J. Owen Forrester, 75, American judge.
- Jean Garon, 76, Canadian Quebecois politician, Minister of Agriculture (1976–1985) and Education (1994–1996), MNA (1976–1998) and Mayor (1998–2005) of Lévis.
- Stephen Gaskin, 79, American counterculture figure, peace activist and commune founder (The Farm).
- David Greenglass, 92, American atomic spy for the Soviet Union, worked on the Manhattan Project.
- Bob Jones, 59, British politician, West Midlands Police and Crime Commissioner (since 2012).
- Anatoly Kornukov, 72, Soviet-born Russian military officer, commander-in-chief of the Russian Air Force (1998–2002), ordered KAL 007 to be shot down.
- Graeme McMahon, 74, Australian AFL football executive, Chairman of Essendon (1996–2003), pancreatic cancer.
- Martin Mehkek, 77, Croatian painter.
- John Muller, 80, South African cricketer.
- Walter Dean Myers, 76, American award-winning children's writer (Fallen Angels, Monster).
- Kipng'eno Arap Ng'eny, 77, Kenyan politician and telecommunications executive, Minister of Water, MP for Ainamoi (1997–2002), Managing Director of KPTC (1979–1993).
- Frederick I. Ordway III, 87, American space scientist.
- Gérard Kango Ouédraogo, 88, Burkinabé politician and diplomat, Prime Minister (1971–1974), Minister of Finance (1958–1959), MP (1974–1980, 1992–1997), member of the French National Assembly for Burkina Faso (1956–1959), Ambassador to the United Kingdom (1961–1966).
- Douglas W. Petersen, 66, American politician.
- Anatoly Petrov, 84, Soviet Olympic athlete.
- Nathan Reiber, 86, Polish-born Canadian businessman.
- Dámaso Ruano, 76, Spanish geometric landscape artist.
- Alan Shefsky, 55, American poet.
- Seth Teller, 50, American computer engineer and scientist (MIT), pioneer in human-robot interactions, suicide by jumping.
- Oscar Yatco, 83, Filipino conductor and violinist.

=== 2 ===
- Emilio Álvarez Montalván, 94, Nicaraguan ophthalmologist, Foreign Minister (1997–1998), heart attack.
- Errie Ball, 103, Welsh-born American golfer, oldest PGA member, last living player from inaugural Masters Tournament, natural causes.
- Chad Brown, 52, American professional poker player and actor, liposarcoma.
- Manuel Cardona, 79, Spanish physicist.
- Wayne Curry, 63, American politician, county executive for Prince George's County, Maryland (1994–2002), lung cancer.
- Lorraine Elliott, 70, Australian politician, Victoria MLA for Mooroolbark (1992–2002), complications from breast cancer.
- Mervyn Finlay, 89, Australian judge and rower, Olympic bronze medalist (1952), member of the Supreme Court of New South Wales (1984–2004).
- Madeleine Gekiere, 96, American artist, suicide.
- Vincent J. Graber Sr., 83, American politician, member of the New York State Assembly (1974–1992), cancer.
- Mary Innes-Ker, Duchess of Roxburghe, 99, British aristocrat.
- Edward Kelley, 81, American football player (Dallas Texans).
- Martin Kilian, 86, German bobsledder and politician.
- Suzanne Knoebel, 87, American cardiologist.
- Harold W. Kuhn, 88, American mathematician.
- Enrique Labo Revoredo, 75, Peruvian football referee.
- Marlinde Massa, 69, German field hockey player.
- Ray McSavaney, 75, American photographer, lymphoma.
- Ridwan Laher Nytagodien, 50, South African political scientist.
- Abdel Hamid Shaheen, 75, Egyptian footballer (Zamalek).
- Richard Toensing, 74, American composer.
- Leo Wardrup, 77, American politician, member of the Virginia House of Delegates (1992–2007).
- Jason Wulf, 42, American graffiti artist, electrocuted.
- Louis Zamperini, 97, American Olympic long-distance runner (1936), military officer, prisoner of war, subject of Unbroken, pneumonia.

=== 3 ===
- Jesse Anderson, 73, American blues singer-songwriter and musician.
- Bjørn Bruland, 87, Norwegian politician and naval officer, President of the NRC (1987–1993), chairman of the NUWC.
- Elizabeth Millicent Chilver, 99, British academic administrator, Principal of Bedford College, London (1964–1971) and Lady Margaret Hall, Oxford (1971–1979).
- Andrew Collier, 69–70, English philosopher, cancer.
- Peter Dawkins, 67, New Zealand-born Australian record producer (Dragon, Australian Crawl, Air Supply) and musician, injuries from a fall.
- Jini Dellaccio, 97, American photographer.
- Ross Doyen, 87, American politician, member of the Kansas House of Representatives (1959–1968) and Senate (1969–1992).
- Ronald A. Edwards, 91, South African military commander, Chief of the Navy (1980–1982).
- Irwin Eisenberg, 94-95, American violinist.
- Tim Flood, 87, Irish hurler (Wexford).
- Rose Folder, 88, American baseball player (Kenosha Comets).
- Guy Gaucher, 84, French Roman Catholic prelate and theologian, Bishop of Meaux (1986–1987), Auxiliary Bishop of Bayeux (1987–2005).
- Volkmar Groß, 66, German footballer.
- Mohamed Mohamud Hayd, Somali politician and military officer, Minister of Education and Environment, MP, admiral, shot.
- Ramai Hayward, 97, New Zealand actress and filmmaker.
- Annik Honoré, 56, Belgian music journalist and promoter, portrayed in Control, cancer.
- David Jones, 79, English footballer (Swansea City, Yeovil Town).
- Morris Martin, 85, American football coach.
- Paul F. X. Moriarty, 94, American jurist and politician.
- Ira Ruskin, 70, American politician, member of the California State Assembly (2004–2010), Mayor of Redwood City (1999–2001), complications from a brain tumor.
- Don Saltsman, 80, American politician, member of the Illinois House of Representatives (1980–1996).
- Zalman Schachter-Shalomi, 89, Ukrainian-born American rabbi.
- Peter Whelan, 82, British playwright (The Herbal Bed, The Accrington Pals).
- Zdeněk Zika, 63, Czech Olympic rower.

=== 4 ===
- Norman Adams, 80, American commercial artist and illustrator.
- Alan Alan, 87, British escapologist and magician.
- Paul Apted, 47, British sound editor (The Book Thief, The Wolverine, The Fault in Our Stars), colon cancer.
- Art Bakeraitis, 89, American basketball player.
- Arimbra Bapu, 78, Indian politician.
- Val Biro, 92, Hungarian-born English children's author, artist and illustrator.
- Maurice Campbell, 94, Canadian curler.
- Arthur Clarke, 92, British sports shooter.
- Benoît Duquesne, 56, French journalist and news anchor, heart attack.
- Giorgio Faletti, 63, Italian author, actor and singer, lung cancer.
- Myer Fredman, 82, British-Australian conductor.
- Torill Thorstad Hauger, 70, Norwegian author, children's writer and illustrator, winner of the Dobloug Prize (1991).
- Truida Heil-Bonnet, 93, Dutch Olympic artistic gymnast.
- C. J. Henderson, 62, American horror and crime author, cancer.
- Frederic Hilbert, 101, American politician.
- Carmen Hornillos, 52, Spanish journalist and television presenter, cancer.
- Andy Jardine, 78, Scottish footballer (Dumbarton).
- Arpad Joó, 66, Hungarian-born American conductor.
- Li Fook-wo, 97, Hong Kong politician and banker (Bank of East Asia).
- Joas Magolego, 42, South African footballer (national team).
- George Moore, 95, American Olympic pentathlete (1948).
- Tolomeo Mwansa, 73, Zambian footballer.
- Otto Nes, 94, Norwegian broadcasting personality and programme director.
- Earl Robinson, 77, American baseball player (Los Angeles Dodgers, Baltimore Orioles) and basketball player (California Golden Bears), heart failure.
- Richard Mellon Scaife, 82, American billionaire philanthropist, newspaper publisher (Pittsburgh Tribune-Review) and political activist, cancer.
- Avelin P. Tacon Jr., 99, American USAF officer, major general commander of Nellis, Langley and Foster Air Force Base, deputy commander of the Twelfth Air Force.
- Harold Ivory Williams, 93, American prelate, Bishop of Mt. Calvary Holy Churches of America.
- Archibald Wilson, 93, Rhodesian-born Australian fighter pilot, flew for the Royal Air Force during World War II.

=== 5 ===
- Sharifah Aini, 61, Malaysian singer, complications from pulmonary fibrosis.
- Imogen Bain, 55, English actress (The Phantom of the Opera, Casualty), pneumonia.
- Noel Black, 77, American film and television director, writer and producer (Skaterdater, Pretty Poison, Private School).
- John Bone, 83, British Anglican prelate, Bishop of Reading (1989–1996).
- Hilton Crawford, 69, American football player.
- Pedro DeBrito, 55, Cape Verdean-born American soccer player, traffic collision.
- Donald Enlow, 87, American scientist.
- Elenor Gordon, 81, Scottish Hall of Fame swimmer, first Scottish Commonwealth Games gold medalist.
- Robert Jeangerard, 81, American Olympic champion basketball player (1956), complications from Alzheimer's disease.
- John Jobst, 94, German-born Australian Roman Catholic prelate, Bishop of Broome (1959–1995).
- Elsbeth Juda, 103, German-born British photographer.
- Peter Marler, 86, British-born American neurobiologist, pneumonia.
- Rosemary Murphy, 89, American actress (To Kill a Mockingbird, Eleanor and Franklin, Synecdoche, New York), Emmy winner (1976), esophageal cancer.
- Peter Nydrle, 59, American commercial and music video director.
- Volodymyr Sabodan, 78, Ukrainian Orthodox hierarch, head of the UOC-MP (since 1992), internal bleeding.
- Kathy Stobart, 89, British jazz saxophonist.
- Rod Taylor, 70, American skier (national team), owner of Woodbury Ski Area.
- Gugi Waaka, 76, New Zealand Māori musician, heart problem.
- Hans-Ulrich Wehler, 82, German historian.
- Brett Wiesner, 31, American soccer player, drowning.
- Brian Wood, 73, English footballer, dementia and Parkinson's disease.
- Don Wright, 84, American Gwich'in politician, President of the Alaska Federation of Natives (1970–1972), involved in negotiations for the Alaska Native Claims Settlement Act.
- Wilbur Young, 65, American football player (Kansas City Chiefs, San Diego Chargers).

=== 6 ===
- Granville Austin, 87, American historian and academic, leading authority on the Constitution of India, recipient of Padma Shri (2011).
- Sankari Prasad Basu, 85, Indian scholar, writer and critic.
- Herbert Berman, 80, American politician, member of the New York City Council (1975–2001).
- Dave Bickers, 76, British motocross racer and movie stuntman (Octopussy, Escape to Athena), stroke.
- Vicente Cabrera Funes, 69–70, Ecuadorian academic.
- Benedito de Assis da Silva, 61, Brazilian footballer (Fluminense), multiple organ failure.
- Alan J. Dixon, 86, American politician, U.S. Senator from Illinois (1981–1993), Illinois Treasurer (1971–1977) and Secretary of State (1977–1981).
- Carl Garner, 99, American engineer (Carl Garner Federal Lands Cleanup Day).
- S. D. Gunadasa, 82, Sri Lankan clothing manufacturer.
- Gene Hodges, 77, American politician, member of the Florida House of Representatives (1972–1988).
- Anne Hollander, 83, American historian of fashion.
- Peter Kearns, 77, English footballer (Aldershot).
- Estanislau Amadeu Kreutz, 86, Brazilian Roman Catholic prelate, Bishop of Santo Ângelo (1973–2004), multiple organ failure.
- Dave Legeno, 50, British actor (Harry Potter, Snatch, Batman Begins), heat stroke. (body discovered on this date)
- Andrew Mango, 88, Turkish-born British journalist (BBC) and biographer (Mustafa Kemal Atatürk).
- Albert McDonald, 83, American politician, member of the Alabama Senate (1974–1982).
- Carleton Opgaard, 85, American educator.
- Zdeněk Pičman, 81, Czech Olympic silver medallist footballer, (1964).
- Rogelio Polesello, 75, Argentine muralist, optical artist and sculptor, complications from a bacterial blood infection.
- Tô Hoài, 93, Vietnamese writer.
- James Clinton Turk, 91, American senior judge, member (since 1972) and Chief Judge (1973–1993) of the U.S. District Court for Western Virginia.
- Ernesto Ueltschi, 92, Argentine politician, Governor of Mendoza (1958–1961).
- Martin Van Geneugden, 82, Belgian professional road bicycle racer.
- Margaret Wenzell, 89, American baseball player (Kalamazoo Lassies, Battle Creek Belles, South Bend Blue Sox).

=== 7 ===
- Vicenç Badalona Ballestar, 85, Spanish figurative artist and author.
- Horst Bollmann, 89, German actor.
- Duccia Camiciotti, 86, Italian poet.
- Mario Coyula Cowley, 79, Cuban architect, cancer.
- Alfredo Di Stéfano, 88, Argentine-born Spanish football player and coach (Real Madrid), complications from a heart attack.
- Frankie Dunlop, 85, American jazz drummer.
- Aaron Fussell, 91, American politician and educator, member of the North Carolina House of Representatives (1978–1994).
- Francisco Gabica, 76, Spanish cyclist, winner of the Vuelta a España (1966), complications during heart surgery.
- Lars Gårding, 94, Swedish mathematician.
- Bertil Haase, 91, Swedish modern pentathlete, Olympic bronze medalist (1948).
- Solomon Humes. 63, Bahamian bishop.
- Philip Hurlic, 86, American actor (Our Gang).
- Lois Johnson, 72, American country music singer.
- Jon Pyong-ho, 88, North Korean military officer, general and secretary in charge of nuclear weapons and arms development, heart attack.
- Dick Jones, 87, American actor (Pinocchio, Buffalo Bill, Jr.).
- Lammtarra, 22, British racehorse, Cartier Champion Three-year-old Colt (1995), won Epsom Derby, KG VI and QE Stakes and Prix de l'Arc de Triomphe, euthanized.
- Denis Lyons, 78, Irish politician, TD for Cork North-Central (1981–1992).
- Sheila K. McCullagh, 93, English author.
- Howard Plumb, 42, British Olympic windsurfer (1996), injuries sustained in a traffic collision.
- Donald Ross, 91, South African-born British surgeon.
- Stanley Julian Roszkowski, 91, American senior judge, member of the U.S. District Court for Northern Illinois (1977–1998).
- Michael Scudamore, 82, English jockey.
- Mohamed Shangole, 83, Somali footballer (national team).
- Eduard Shevardnadze, 86, Soviet Georgian politician and diplomat, President (1992–2003), Soviet Minister of Foreign Affairs (1985–1990, 1991).
- Anthony Smith, 88, British explorer, balloonist and television presenter.
- Bora Todorović, 83, Yugoslav-born Serbian actor (Who's Singin' Over There?, Underground, Balkan Express), complications from a stroke.
- Peter Underwood, 76, Australian jurist, Governor of Tasmania (since 2008), member and Chief Justice of the Supreme Court of Tasmania, complications from a kidney tumour.

=== 8 ===
- Vanna Bonta, 56, Italian-born American actress (Beauty and the Beast, The Bourne Supremacy).
- Ray Buckingham, 84, Australian Olympic fencer.
- Maxine Cochran, 87, Canadian politician, Nova Scotia Minister of Transport (1985–1988) and MLA for Lunenburg (1984–1988).
- Tom Collings, 75, British-born Canadian Anglican prelate, Bishop of Keewatin (1991–1996).
- North Dalrymple-Hamilton, 92, English Navy officer.
- Fred Daspit, 83, American artist and academic.
- Plínio de Arruda Sampaio, 83, Brazilian jurist and politician, bone cancer.
- Bob Denton, 79, American football player.
- John V. Evans, 89, American politician, Governor of Idaho (1977–1987).
- Richard Hewes, 87, American politician, member (1966–1978) and Speaker (1972–1974) of the Maine House of Representatives and Senate (1978–1980), Parkinson's disease.
- John Hoover, 51, American baseball player (Texas Rangers, Fresno State Bulldogs).
- Lindsay Jacob, 67, Australian rules footballer (North Melbourne).
- Guy Lintilhac, 86, French cyclist.
- Nosipho Ntwanambi, 54, South African politician, women's and human rights activist, MP (2008–2014), first female Chief Whip of the National Council of Provinces.
- Ben Pangelinan, 58, American Guamanian politician, member (since 1994) and Speaker (2003–2005) of the Legislature of Guam, cancer.
- Mario J. Rossetti, 78, American judge, member of the New York Supreme Court and New York Court of Claims (1987–2006).
- Howard Siler, 69, American Olympic bobsledder and coach (1980).
- Tom Veryzer, 61, American baseball player (Detroit Tigers, Chicago Cubs), stroke.

=== 9 ===
- Hameed Al-Qushaibi, Yemeni soldier. (death announced on this date)
- Lorenzo Álvarez Florentín, 87, Paraguayan composer and violinist, heart attack.
- Bamidele Aturu, 49, Nigerian lawyer and human rights activist, leukemia.
- David Azrieli, 92, Polish-born Canadian-Israeli billionaire real estate and finance executive.
- Buba Baldeh, 61, Gambian politician, journalist and editor, Minister of Youth and Sports, MP for Basse (1982–1985) and Jimara (1987–1994), MD of The Daily Observer.
- Julio Bernad, 85, Spanish footballer (Real Zaragoza).
- Alison Bielski, 88, Welsh poet and writer.
- Elaine Brody, 91, American gerontologist and sociologist, respiratory failure.
- John Cloake, 89, British diplomat, Ambassador to Bulgaria (1986–1990).
- Philip DeWilde, 41, Canadian actor.
- Eileen Ford, 92, American model agency executive, co-founder of Ford Models, complications from meningioma and osteoporosis.
- Mohammad Mohammadi Gilani, 85, Iranian judge and politician.
- Ahmed Sheikh Jama, Somali politician and poet.
- Don Lenhardt, 91, American baseball player and coach (St. Louis Browns/Baltimore Orioles, Boston Red Sox).
- Yoel Lerner, 72–73, Israeli linguist, translator, educator and terrorist. (death announced on this date)
- Fred Martinez, 60, Belizean politician and diplomat, Minister of Trade (1997–1998), Senator (1984–1989, 1997–1998), Ambassador to Mexico and Guatemala.
- Luiz Alberto Dias Menezes, 63, Brazilian geologist and mineral dealer.
- Alan Mercer, 82, British academic, stroke.
- Robert Methuen, 7th Baron Methuen, 82, British peer and politician.
- Carol Mumford, 70, American politician.
- Norman Cummings Nevin, 79, Northern Irish geneticist.
- Ken Simpson, 76, Australian ornithologist and writer (Field Guide to the Birds of Australia).
- John Spinks, 60, British guitarist, singer and songwriter (The Outfield), liver cancer.
- Janet Thompson, 80, American basketball player.
- Ralph C. Thompson, 67, Canadian judge, member (1985–2005) and Chief Justice (1985–1990, 1995–2000) of the Provincial Court of PEI, cancer.
- Ken Thorne, 90, British composer (Superman II, Help!), Oscar winner (A Funny Thing Happened on the Way to the Forum).

=== 10 ===
- José Manuel Abdalá, 57, Mexican journalist and politician, MP for Tamaulipas (2003–2006), colon cancer.
- Aimo Aho, 63, Finnish javelin thrower.
- Arnold Beck, 65, Liechtenstein alpine skier.
- Robert C. Broomfield, 81, American judge, member (since 1985) and Chief Judge (1994–1999) of the U.S. District Court of Arizona, member of the FISC (2002–2009), cancer.
- Juby Bustamante, 75, Spanish journalist.
- John R. Driscoll, 90, American politician, member of the Massachusetts House of Representatives (1975–1992).
- Siegfried Geißler, 85, German composer, conductor, hornist and politician.
- Curt Gentry, 83, American author (Helter Skelter), lung cancer.
- Paul Gibson Jr., 86, American airline executive (American Airlines), Deputy Mayor of New York City (1974–1977).
- Douglas Goodfellow, 97, New Zealand dairy executive and philanthropist.
- Peter Mentz Jebsen, 84, Norwegian businessperson, athlete and politician.
- On Kawara, 81, Japanese conceptual artist.
- Juozas Kazickas, 96, Lithuanian billionaire philanthropist, financier, natural resources and telecommunications executive, founder of Omnitel.
- Peter Matheka Mutuku, 20, Kenyan Olympic runner, traffic collision.
- Paul G. Risser, 74, American educator and ecologist, President of Oregon State University (1996–2002) and Miami University (1993–1996).
- Gloria Schweigerdt, 80, American baseball player (Chicago Colleens, Battle Creek Belles).
- Zohra Sehgal, 102, Indian actress (Bend It Like Beckham, The Mistress of Spices, Doctor Who) and choreographer, heart failure.
- Louis Vignaud, 85, French Olympic sports shooter.

=== 11 ===
- R. Perry Beaver, 75, American Muscogee politician, Principal Chief of the Muscogee (Creek) Nation (1995–2003).
- Madeleine Bleau, 85, Canadian politician.
- Al Broadhurst, 87, American speed skater.
- Sir Howard Cooke, 98, Jamaican politician, Governor-General (1991–2006), MP (WIF) (1958–1962) and MP for St James (1962–1980), Senate President (1989–1993).
- Lyndley Craven, 68, Australian botanist.
- Jean-Louis Gauthier, 58, French racing cyclist, heart attack.
- Charlie Haden, 76, American jazz bassist and bandleader, three-time Grammy Award winner (Nocturne, Land of the Sun, The Shape of Jazz to Come), post-polio syndrome.
- Eilene Hannan, 67, Australian opera singer, cancer.
- Ray Lonnen, 74, British actor (Harry's Game, The Sandbaggers, Z-Cars), cancer.
- Carin Mannheimer, 79, Swedish author and screenwriter, cancer.
- Bill McGill, 74, American basketball player (Chicago Zephyrs, New York Knicks).
- Ihor Momot, 48, Ukrainian border guard colonel, artillery strike.
- Vincent F. Nicolosi, 74, American politician, breast cancer.
- Tommy Ramone, 65, Hungarian-born American Hall of Fame record producer and drummer (The Ramones), bile duct cancer.
- John Seigenthaler, 86, American newspaper journalist and editor (The Tennessean, USA Today), editor for team that won Pulitzer Prize (1962).
- Randall Stout, 56, American architect, renal cell carcinoma.
- Paul Van Riper, 97, American political scientist.

=== 12 ===
- Jamil Ahmad, 83, Pakistani author, heart attack.
- Nestor Basterretxea, 90, Spanish Basque artist.
- Emil Bobu, 87, Romanian communist activist and politician, Interior Minister (1973–1975), Labor Minister (1979–1981), heart attack.
- Chris de Broglio, 84, Mauritian-born South African weightlifter and anti-apartheid activist, recipient of the Olympic Order (1997).
- Mark Burchett, 54, American director, producer and actor.
- Alberto Cassano, 79, Argentine engineer and academic.
- Pat Costello, 85, American Olympic silver medallist rower (1956, 1952).
- Ken Goodwin, 79, Australian academic and author.
- Kenneth J. Gray, 89, American politician, member of the U.S. House of Representatives for Illinois (1955–1974, 1985–1989), heart attack.
- Aimé Gruet-Masson, 73, French Olympic biathlete (1968, 1972, 1976).
- Alistair Hanna, 69, Northern Irish managerial consulting executive, cancer.
- Preben Hoch, 88, Danish Olympic rower.
- Zoia Horn, 96, American librarian and intellectual freedom advocate.
- Red Klotz, 93, American basketball player (Baltimore Bullets) and coach (Washington Generals).
- Bill Koski, 82, American baseball player (Pittsburgh Pirates).
- Barrie Marmion, 94, English microbiologist.
- Hullad Moradabadi, 72, Indian Hindi language poet, cardiac arrest.
- Valeriya Novodvorskaya, 64, Soviet Russian politician and dissident, septic shock.
- Peter Sainsbury, 80, English cricketer (Hampshire).
- Charles P. Smith, 88, American politician, Wisconsin State Treasurer (1971–1991).
- Albert Stunkard, 92, American psychiatrist, pneumonia.
- Tom Tierney, 85, American paper doll maker.
- Barbara Turf, 71, American home furnishing executive, CEO of Crate & Barrel (2008–2012), pancreatic cancer.
- Tommy Valentine, 64, American golfer, cancer.
- Sam Venuto, 86, American football player (Washington Redskins).
- Jerzy Żyszkiewicz, 64, Polish politician.

=== 13 ===
- Thomas Berger, 89, American novelist (Little Big Man).
- Geoffrey Blackburn, 99, Australian Baptist minister.
- Jeremy Browne, 11th Marquess of Sligo, 75, Irish hereditary peer.
- Alfred de Grazia, 94, American political scientist and author.
- Con Devitt, 86, Scottish-born New Zealand trade unionist.
- Nadine Gordimer, 90, South African writer (The Conservationist, Burger's Daughter, July's People) and anti-apartheid activist, Nobel Prize laureate in Literature (1991).
- Jimmy Hedges, 71, American wood carver, drowned.
- Giriraj Kishore, 94, Indian Hindu political activist.
- Jeff Leiding, 52, American football player (Indianapolis Colts), heart attack.
- Josh Liavaʻa, 65, Tongan-born New Zealand rugby league player (national team), shot.
- Werner Lueg, 82, German Olympic bronze medallist middle-distance runner (1952) and 1500 metre joint world record holder (1952–1954).
- Lorin Maazel, 84, American conductor, violinist, composer and music director (NY Philharmonic, Cleveland Orchestra, Vienna State Opera), complications of pneumonia.
- Cledan Mears, 91, Welsh Anglican prelate, Bishop of Bangor (1982–1992).
- Jan Nolten, 84, Dutch racing cyclist, brain hemorrhage.
- Prized, 28, American Thoroughbred racehorse.
- Halima Rafiq, 17, Pakistani cricketer and sexual harassment plaintiff, suicide by acid ingestion.
- Omer Vercouteren, 84, Belgian Olympic wrestler.
- Gert Voss, 72, German actor, leukemia.

=== 14 ===
- Alice Coachman, 90, American high jumper, first black woman to become Olympic champion (1948).
- Herbert A. David, 88, German-born American mathematical statistician.
- Hugh Davidson, 84, Canadian music critic and arts administrator.
- Jessie Gruman, 60, American social psychologist.
- Pia Gyger, 73, Swiss religious author.
- Vilhjálmur Hjálmarsson, 99, Icelandic politician.
- Martin Richard Hoffmann, 82, American public servant, Secretary of the Army (1975–1977).
- Tom Jones, 90, American football player and coach.
- Guillermo Leaden, 100, Argentine Roman Catholic prelate, Auxiliary Bishop of Buenos Aires (1975–1992).
- Vange Leonel, 51, Brazilian singer-songwriter, author, and feminist and LGBT activist, ovarian cancer.
- George McCague, 84, Canadian politician, Ontario MPP for Dufferin-Simcoe (1975–1987) and Simcoe West (1987–1990), leukemia.
- Sir Jimmy McGregor, 90, British colonial politician, member of the Hong Kong Executive Council (1995–1997) and Legislative Council (1988–1995).
- John Milne, 72, Scottish broadcaster (BBC Scotland).
- John Victor Parker, 85, American senior (former chief) judge, member of the U.S. District Court for Middle Louisiana (1979–2014).
- Antonio Riva Palacio, 88, Mexican politician, Governor of Morelos (1988–1994).
- Tom Rolf, 82, Swedish-born American film editor (Taxi Driver, The Right Stuff, Heat), Oscar winner (1984), complications from hip surgery.
- James Stillwell, 79, American baseball team owner (Seattle Mariners).
- Horacio Troche, 79, Uruguayan footballer (national team).
- Jack Tocco, 87, American mafioso, head of the Detroit Partnership, suspect in the Jimmy Hoffa disappearance, natural causes.
- Leopoldo Verona, 82, Argentine actor.
- Vintage Crop, 27, Irish Thoroughbred racehorse, won Melbourne Cup (1993). (death announced on this date)
- Vasile Zavoda, 84, Romanian Olympic footballer (1952).

=== 15 ===
- Óscar Acosta, 81, Honduran author, diplomat and poet, Ambassador to Spain, Italy and the Holy See.
- Adhu Awiti, Kenyan politician, Minister of Planning (2001–2002), MP for Karachuonyo (1997–2007), cancer.
- Edda Buding, 77, German tennis player, Olympic champion (1968).
- James MacGregor Burns, 95, American historian (Roosevelt: The Soldier of Freedom) and political scientist, recipient of the Pulitzer Prize (1971).
- Elda Cividino, 92, Italian Olympic gymnast.
- Gerald Cresswell, 85, South African cricketer.
- William Dumpson, 84, American baseball player.
- Mildred Gillett, 105, English local historian.
- Lyndam Gregory, 59, Indian-born British actor (The Archers, Coronation Street, EastEnders), lung cancer.
- Sulekha Hussain, 85, Indian Urdu novelist.
- Faruk Ilgaz, 92, Turkish football administrator, chairman of Fenerbahçe S.K.
- Erosi Kitsmarishvili, 49, Georgian diplomat, Ambassador to Russia (2008), suspected suicide by gunshot. (body discovered on this date)
- Pietro Giacomo Nonis, 87, Italian Roman Catholic prelate, Bishop of Vicenza (1988–2003).
- Abdukadir Osman, Somali writer.
- Gerallt Lloyd Owen, 69, Welsh poet.
- Edward Perl, 87, American neuroscientist.
- Rudolf Rauer, 64, German Olympic handball player (1976).
- Robert A. Roe, 90, American politician, member of the U.S. House of Representatives for New Jersey's 8th district (1969–1993).

=== 16 ===
- Julio Abbadie, 83, Uruguayan footballer.
- Karl Albrecht, 94, German billionaire grocery executive, co-founder of Aldi.
- Mario Bacher, 78, Italian ski mountaineer and cross-country skier.
- Harriet Barber, 46, English figurative painter, breast cancer.
- Pulin Das, 95, Indian cricketer.
- Norberto Esbrez, 47, Argentine tango dancer, liver failure.
- Hans Funck, 61, German film editor (Das Experiment, Downfall, Sophie Scholl – The Final Days), asthma attack.
- Virgilio Gonzalez, 88, Cuban-born American political activist and burglar (Watergate scandal).
- Anna Kaaleste, 84, Soviet Olympic cross-country skier.
- Burkhardt Öller, 71, German footballer (Eintracht Braunschweig, Hannover 96).
- Mary Ellen Otremba, 63, American politician, member of the Minnesota House of Representatives (1997–2010).
- Dennis Saleebey, 77, American academic.
- Frank A. Salvatore, 92, American politician, member of the Pennsylvania House of Representatives (1973–1984, 1985–2000).
- Sir Alexander Stirling, 86, British diplomat, Ambassador to Bahrain (1971–1972), Iraq (1977–1980), Tunisia (1981–1984) and Sudan (1984–1986).
- Szymon Szurmiej, 91, Polish actor and theatre manager (Jewish Theatre, Warsaw).
- Manfred Wekwerth, 84, German theatre director (Berliner Ensemble).
- Johnny Winter, 70, American Hall of Fame musician (Nothin' but the Blues), Grammy winner (1978–1980).
- Heinz Zemanek, 94, Austrian pioneering computer engineer.

=== 17 ===
- Fariha al-Berkawi, Libyan politician, shot.
- Ross Burden, 45, New Zealand celebrity chef (MasterChef, Ready Steady Cook, MasterChef New Zealand), infection from bone marrow transplant.
- Stratford Caldecott, 60, English author, editor, publisher, and blogger, prostate cancer.
- Enric Cluselles, 99, Spanish artist.
- J. T. Edson, 86, English novelist.
- Robert L. Goodale, 84, American surgeon.
- Henry Hartsfield, 80, American NASA astronaut and test pilot (Columbia), commander of Discovery and Challenger missions, complications from back surgery.
- Ernie Lancaster, 60, American blues musician, cancer.
- Bjørn Johan Landmark, 87, Norwegian physicist.
- Jack Lewis, Baron Lewis of Newnham, 86, British politician, educator and chemist, first Warden for Robinson College.
- John Melvin, 76, American research engineer.
- Ian Moutray, 78, Australian rugby union player.
- Bill Mulliken, 74, American swimmer, Olympic champion (1960).
- Jim Myers, 92, American football coach (Iowa State Cyclones, Texas A&M Aggies).
- Otto Piene, 86, German color abstract artist, sculptor and academic (MIT), co-founder of Group Zero.
- Andries Putter, 78, South African naval officer, chief of the Navy, kidney failure.
- J. Sasikumar, 85, Indian filmmaker and director (Kudumbini, Thommante Makkal).
- Robert Smithdas, 89, American deaf-blind teacher.
- Elaine Stritch, 89, American actress (Elaine Stritch at Liberty, Autumn in New York, 30 Rock), Emmy winner (1993, 2004, 2007).
- John Walton, 62, Australian actor (The Young Doctors).
- Notable people killed in the crash of Malaysia Airlines Flight 17:
  - Liam Davison, 56, Australian author.
  - Joep Lange, 59, Dutch physician, President of the International AIDS Society (2002–2004).
  - Shuba Jay, 38, Malaysian television and theatre actress.
  - Willem Witteveen, 62, Dutch politician and legal scholar, member of the Senate (1999–2007, since 2013).

=== 18 ===
- Donald Arden, 98, English Anglican prelate, Archbishop of Central Africa, Bishop of Nyasaland-Malawi.
- Andreas Biermann, 33, German footballer, suicide.
- Tony Dean, 65, British rugby league player (Hull F.C.), cancer.
- William F. Enneking, 88, American orthopaedic oncologist.
- James Govan, 64, American singer.
- Sebastian Graham Jones, 56, British television director (Travelling Man, Coronation Street, Ace of Wands), cancer.
- Jure Pelivan, 85, Bosnian politician, Prime Minister of the Socialist Republic of Bosnia and Herzegovina (1990–1992) and the Republic of Bosnia and Herzegovina (1992).
- Carlo Dalla Pozza, 71, Italian philosopher.
- João Ubaldo Ribeiro, 73, Brazilian writer, pulmonary embolism.
- Augie Rodriguez, 86, American dancer, popularized the Mambo.
- Thomas I. Sangster, 82, American politician.
- Sir Nicholas Scheele, 70, British automotive manufacturing executive, President and CEO of Jaguar Cars (1992–1999) and Ford Motor Company (2001–2005).
- Dietmar Schönherr, 88, Austrian actor and entertainer.
- John Wall, 70, American educator and politician, member of the North Dakota House of Representatives (since 2004).

=== 19 ===
- Rubem Alves, 80, Brazilian writer, philosopher and theologian, multiple organ failure due to pneumonia.
- Madeline Amgott, 92, American television producer (60 Minutes), lymphoma.
- Skye McCole Bartusiak, 21, American actress (The Patriot, The Cider House Rules, Boogeyman), accidental drug overdose.
- Conley Byrd, 89, American judge.
- Jack Coffey, 87, American television director (All My Children, Another World, Somerset).
- Sherman Drexler, 89, American painter, cancer.
- David Easton, 97, Canadian political scientist.
- Peter Evans, 87, British restaurateur.
- John Fasano, 52, American screenwriter (Another 48 Hrs.), director (Rock 'n' Roll Nightmare) and weapons expert, heart failure.
- Lionel Ferbos, 103, American jazz trumpeter.
- Iring Fetscher, 92, German political scientist.
- Paul M. Fleiss, 80, American pediatrician.
- Jim Fulghum, 70, American politician, member of the North Carolina House of Representatives, esophageal cancer.
- James Garner, 86, American actor (The Rockford Files, Maverick, The Great Escape), Emmy winner (1977), heart attack.
- Robert Havern III, 65, American politician, cancer.
- Sergio Insunza, 94, Chilean lawyer and politician, Minister of Justice (1972–1973).
- Jerzy Jurka, 64, Polish-American biologist.
- Ray King, 89, English footballer (Port Vale, Newcastle United), complications from a fall.
- Dan Markel, 41, Canadian-American legal academic, shot.
- Peter Marquardt, 50, American actor (Desperado, El Mariachi, Deus Ex).
- Petar Nikezić, 64, Serbian footballer (Vojvodina).
- Yehuda Nir, 84, Polish-born Israeli-American psychiatrist and Holocaust survivor (The Lost Childhood).
- Norberto Odebrecht, 93, Brazilian engineer, founder of Odebrecht and the Odebrecht Foundation, cardiac complications.
- Ingemar Odlander, 78, Swedish journalist and news reporter (Rapport).
- Harry Pougher, 73, English cricketer (Lincolnshire).
- Leen Vleggeert, 83, Dutch politician, member of the Senate (1981–1983).
- Mickey Walker, 74, American football player (New York Giants).
- John Winkin, 94, American baseball coach (Maine Black Bears), complications from a stroke.

=== 20 ===
- Álex Angulo, 61, Spanish Basque actor (Pan's Labyrinth, El día de la bestia), traffic collision.
- William Asscher, 83–84, British doctor, bowel cancer.
- Victor Atiyeh, 91, American politician, Governor of Oregon (1979–1987), member of the Oregon House (1959–1964) and Senate (1965–1978), renal failure.
- Thomas Brennan, 74, Irish Olympic equestrian.
- C. C. Bridgewater, 70, American judge.
- Ian Brune, 64, South African cricketer.
- Kadhal Dhandapani, 71, Indian actor (Kaadhal), cardiac arrest.
- Ray DiPierro, 87, American football player (Green Bay Packers), complications of Parkinson's and Alzheimer's diseases.
- Peter S. Dokuchitz, 86, American politician.
- Herlyn Espinal, 31, Honduran journalist, shot.
- John Fairgrieve, 88, British Olympic sprinter.
- Joseph Grange, 74, American philosopher.
- Thor Halvorssen, 71, Venezuelan-Norwegian businessman, CEO and President of CANTV (1978-1979), fall.
- Pierre Hutton, 86, Australian diplomat.
- Berndt Katter, 82, Finnish modern pentathlete, Olympic bronze medalist (1956).
- Sam Koch, 59, American soccer coach.
- Ivan Kuvačić, 91, Croatian sociologist.
- Constantin Lucaci, 91, Romanian contemporary sculptor.
- Bob May, 87, American ice hockey player and coach.
- Bob McNamara, 82, American football player (Winnipeg Blue Bombers, Denver Broncos).
- Saybattal Mursalimov, 83, Kyrgyzstani Olympic equestrian.
- Tony Palmer, 48, British Episcopalian prelate, traffic collision.
- Lynda Patterson, 40, Northern Irish-born New Zealand Anglican priest, Dean of Christ Church Cathedral (since 2013), natural causes.
- Berl Priebe, 96, American politician, member of the Iowa House of Representatives (1968–1972) and Senate (1972–1996).
- Dixon Prentice, 95, American judge.
- Panna Rittikrai, 53, Thai martial arts choreographer, actor and film director, complications from multiple organ failure.
- Lois Rosenthal, 75, American publisher and philanthropist.
- Yevgeny Samoteykin, 85, Russian Soviet diplomat, Ambassador to Australia (1983–1990).
- Klaus Schmidt, 61, German archaeologist (Göbekli Tepe), heart attack.
- Manfred Sexauer, 83, German radio and television presenter.
- Boswell Williams, 88, Saint Lucian politician, Governor-General (1980–1982), MLA for Vieux Fort Quarter (1974–1979).

=== 21 ===
- Louise Abeita, 87, American Pueblo writer, poet, and educator.
- Alan Astbury, 79, Canadian physicist.
- George Baillie, 95, British Olympic ice hockey player.
- Félix Betancourt, 68, Cuban Olympic boxer.
- Dan Borislow, 52, American telecommunications executive, inventor of magicJack, heart attack.
- Pearl Kong Chen, 88, Chinese-American cooking teacher and cookbook author.
- Jagdish Choudhary, 72, Indian politician, heart attack.
- John M. Coyne, 97, American politician, Mayor of Brooklyn, Ohio (1948–1999).
- Lettice Curtis, 99, British World War II military pilot and test engineer, first woman to qualify in a four engine bomber.
- Robert William Donnelly, 83, American Roman Catholic prelate, Auxiliary Bishop of Toledo (1984–2006).
- Verda Erman, 70, Turkish pianist, winner of the Long-Thibaud-Crespin Competition (1965), leukemia.
- Stewart Hillis, 70, Scottish physician.
- Liv Holtskog, 79, Norwegian poet and farmer.
- Harald Hove, 65, Norwegian politician.
- Aimo Jokinen, 83, Finnish Olympic cyclist.
- Hans-Peter Kaul, 70, German judge, member of the International Criminal Court.
- Rilwanu Lukman, 75, Nigerian oil executive, Minister of Oil and OPEC, Director of the NNPC.
- Stephen Schanuel, 81, American mathematician.
- Kevin Skinner, 86, New Zealand rugby union player (national team).
- Richard Stanbury, 91, Canadian politician, President of the Liberal Party of Canada (1968–1973).
- Tareq Suheimat, 77, Jordanian physician, military officer and politician.

=== 22 ===
- Ocie Austin, 67, American football player (Pittsburgh Steelers, Baltimore Colts).
- Leslie Banning, 83, American actress.
- John Blundell, 61, British economist and policy adviser, Director General of the Institute of Economic Affairs.
- Johann Breyer, 89, German-American suspected war criminal.
- Waltraud Bundschuh, 86, German politician.
- Betty Jo Charlton, 91, American politician, member of the Kansas House of Representatives (1980–1994).
- Garry Goodrow, 80, American actor (The Connection, Dirty Dancing, Escape from Alcatraz).
- Taworn Jirapan, 75, Thai Olympic cyclist.
- Everett Johnson, 78, American politician.
- Glenn Jowitt, 59, New Zealand photographer.
- Louis Lentin, 80, Irish theatre, film and television director.
- Slaheddine Ben Mbarek, 77, Tunisian politician and diplomat.
- Robert Newhouse, 64, American football player (Dallas Cowboys), heart disease.
- Risto Punkka, 57, Finnish Olympic biathlete.
- Nitzan Shirazi, 43, Israeli football player and manager, cancer.
- Elma Steck, 91, American baseball player.
- Morris Stevenson, 71, Scottish footballer (Morton).
- Helmut Uhlig, 71, German Olympic basketball player.

=== 23 ===
- Dora Bryan, 91, British actress (A Taste of Honey, The Birthday Party, Last of the Summer Wine).
- James Gustafson, 75, American politician.
- Helen Johns, 99, American swimmer, Olympic champion (1932).
- Don Lanier, 78, American songwriter.
- Norman Leyden, 96, American conductor, composer and musician.
- Gilad Margalit, 55, Israeli historian and writer.
- Elizabeth Orr Shaw, 90, American politician, member of the Iowa House of Representatives (1967–1973) and Senate (1973–1979).
- Ariano Suassuna, 87, Brazilian writer, cardiac arrest as a complication from a stroke.
- Denis Sugrue, 87, Irish Olympic rower.
- Haris Suleman, 17, American pilot, plane crash.
- Jordan Tabor, 23, English footballer (Cheltenham), fall.
- Bill Thompson, 82, American television host (The Wallace and Ladmo Show).
- Frank Vaughan, 96, Australian rugby league player (Eastern Suburbs).
- Saado Ali Warsame, 64, Somali singer-songwriter and politician, MP (since 2012), shot.
- Yeh Ken-chuang, 83, Taiwanese master carpenter, plane crash.

=== 24 ===
- Jaan Arder, 62, Estonian singer (Apelsin).
- Ik-Hwan Bae, 57, South Korean violinist.
- David Broomhead, 64, British mathematician.
- Edward N. Coffman, 72, American scholar.
- Ian Rees Davies, 72, British dentist and university administrator, Vice-Chancellor of the University of Hong Kong (2000–2002).
- Christian Falk, 52, Swedish singer and bassist (Imperiet), pancreatic cancer.
- Cees Heerschop, 79, Dutch footballer (PSV Eindhoven).
- Walt Martin, 69, American sound mixer (Flags of Our Fathers, Mystic River, Jersey Boys), vasculitis.
- Patrick Sawyer, 40, Liberian-born American lawyer, ebola virus disease.
- Dale Schlueter, 68, American basketball player (Portland Trail Blazers), cancer.
- See More Business, 24, Irish thoroughbred, won King George VI Chase (1997, 1999) and Cheltenham Gold Cup (1999).
- Władysław Sidorowicz, 68, Polish politician and political prisoner, Minister of Health (1991), Senator for Wrocław (2005–2011).
- Alois Spichtig, 87, Swiss graphic artist and sculptor.
- Hans-Hermann Sprado, 58, German journalist and author.
- V. Sreekumar, 48, Indian cricketer.
- Yoo Chae-yeong, 40, South Korean singer, stomach cancer.

=== 25 ===
- Pedro Luís António, 93, Angolan Roman Catholic prelate, Bishop of Kwito-Bié (1979–1997).
- Sen Arevshatyan, 86, Armenian manuscript scholar, director of the Matenadaran.
- Alphonse Baume, 80, Swiss Olympic skier.
- Carlo Bergonzi, 90, Italian operatic tenor.
- Melvin F. Chubb Jr., 80, American soldier.
- Beau Genius, 29, Canadian Thoroughbred racehorse, euthanized.
- Cheng Yang-ping, 84, Hong Kong simultaneous interpreter, Chief Interpreter (1972–1986) and Chief Conference Interpreter (1986–1987) of the Hong Kong Government.
- UK Ching, 76, Bangladeshi freedom fighter, recipient of Bir Bikrom (1971), stroke.
- Kenneth Ferries, 78, Australian cricketer.
- David Green, 62, American politician, member of the Mississippi House of Representatives (1979–2005).
- Alan C. Greenberg, 86, American financier, chairman and CEO of Bear Stearns, complications from cancer.
- Georgia Mae Harp, 93, American singer.
- Çolpan İlhan, 77, Turkish actress, heart attack.
- Bel Kaufman, 103, German-born American teacher and author (Up the Down Staircase).
- Richard Larter, 85, English-born Australian pop artist.
- Manuel Martínez Canales, 86, Spanish footballer (Athletic Bilbao).
- Ronaldo Rogério de Freitas Mourão, 79, Brazilian astronomer.
- Thor-Eirik Gulbrandsen Mykland, 74, Norwegian politician.
- Ib Nielsen, 88, Danish Olympic rower.
- Manny Roth, 96, American nightclub owner (Cafe Wha?).
- Zafar Saifullah, 78, Indian civil servant, Minister for Administration (1993–1994), first Muslim to be appointed to cabinet-level position.
- Art Schult, 86, American baseball player (New York Yankees, Chicago Cubs, Boston Red Sox).
- Wilhelm Solheim, 89, American anthropologist.
- Peter Williams, 89, British physician, Director of the Wellcome Trust (1965–1991).

=== 26 ===
- Oleh Babaiev, 48, Ukrainian politician, Mayor of Kremenchuk (since 2010), shot.
- Raúl Hernández Barrón, 37, Mexican drug lord, shot.
- Ange Dellasantina, 80, French footballer.
- Erich Fuchs, 89, German Olympic sprinter.
- Paul Kemp, 83, American football player, coach, and scout.
- Charles R. Larson, 77, American naval officer, Commanding Admiral of the USPACOM, Superintendent of the U.S. Naval Academy (1983–1986, 1994–1998), pneumonia.
- Sir Richard MacCormac, 75, British modernist architect, cancer.
- Spiridon Mattar, 93, Lebanese-born Brazilian Melkite Catholic hierarch, Bishop of Nossa Senhora do Paraíso em São Paulo (1978–1990).
- William Menahan, 78, American politician, member of the Montana House of Representatives (1970–2000), pulmonary fibrosis.
- Majeed Nizami, 86, Pakistani newspaper journalist and editor (Nawa-i-Waqt), heart ailment.
- Sergei O. Prokofieff, 60, Russian anthroposophist.
- Louise Shivers, 84, American novelist, heart failure.
- Roland Verhavert, 87, Belgian film director (Seagulls Die in the Harbour, The Conscript, Rubens), heart attack.

=== 27 ===
- Eric Anderson, 83, New Zealand rugby union player (national team).
- Sir Richard Bolt, 91, New Zealand military officer, Air Marshal Chief of Staff and Defence Staff Chief.
- G. Raymond Chang, 65, Jamaican-born Canadian financial analyst, Chancellor of Ryerson University (2006–2012), acute myeloid leukemia.
- Stepan Chubenko, 16, Ukrainian football player, shot.
- Warren Dibble, 83, New Zealand playwright and poet, Robert Burns Fellow (1969).
- Kristina Fetters, 34, American convicted murderer, youngest woman to receive life sentence in United States, breast cancer.
- George Freese, 87, American baseball player (Pittsburgh Pirates).
- Jane Richardson Hanks, 105, American anthropologist.
- Sam Hunter, 91, American art historian.
- Sir Robin Ibbs, 88, British banker, Chairman of Lloyds Bank (1993–1997).
- Wallace Jones, 88, American basketball player (Kentucky Wildcats, Indianapolis Olympians), Olympic champion (1948).
- Kyozan Joshu Sasaki, 107, Japanese-born American Rinzai Zen teacher.
- Diouldé Laya, 77, Nigerian sociologist.
- Francesco Marchisano, 85, Italian Roman Catholic prelate, Cardinal of Santa Lucia del Gonfalone (since 2003).
- Peter Miller, 53, Australian software engineer, leukemia.
- Fritz Naef, 80, Swiss Olympic ice hockey player (1956).
- Govind Ram Nirmalkar, 78, Indian actor and folk theatre artist.
- Christine Oddy, 58, British politician, MEP for Midlands Central (1989–1999), cervical cancer.
- Paul St. Pierre, 90, Canadian journalist, author and politician, MP for Coast Chilcotin (1968–1972).
- Paul Schell, 76, American politician, Mayor of Seattle (1998–2002).
- Wilton Schiller, 95, American television producer and writer (Dr. Simon Locke, The Fugitive, Ben Casey).
- James Shankar Singh, 90, Fijian politician.
- Nini Stoltenberg, 51, Norwegian television personality.
- Bert Waits, 73, American mathematician.
- Denis Welch, 69, British racing driver, racing crash.

=== 28 ===
- Margot Adler, 68, American journalist (NPR), radio broadcaster (Hour of the Wolf, Justice Talking) and author, endometrial cancer.
- Philipp Brammer, 44, German actor, fall.
- M. Caldwell Butler, 89, American politician, member of the U.S. House for Virginia's 6th (1972–1983), Virginia House of Delegates (1962–1971).
- Gerardo Cornejo Murrieta, 77, Mexican writer and scholar.
- Madhukar Dighe, 94, Indian politician, Governor of Meghalaya (1990–1995) and Arunachal Pradesh (1993).
- John W. Dorsey, 78, American academic, respiratory failure.
- Željko Đurđić, 51, Serbian handball player (national team).
- Jon Erikson, 59, American long-distance swimmer.
- Brian Eyre, 80, British materials scientist.
- Charles M. Fair, 97, American neuroscience researcher and writer.
- Sally Farmiloe, 60, South African-born British actress (Howards' Way), breast cancer.
- Alex Forbes, 89, Scottish footballer (national team), prostate cancer.
- Michael Gifkins, 68–69, New Zealand literary agent and publisher.
- Arturo Goetz, 70, Argentine actor.
- Bob Hargrave, 94, American football player (University of Notre Dame).
- Hans Georg Herzog, 98, Romanian Olympic handball player (1936).
- Thomas Horton, 88, American Olympic sprint canoer.
- Willis Knuckles, 68, Liberian politician.
- Veikko Lahti, 87, Finnish Olympic wrestler.
- Eugene F. Lally, 79, American aerospace engineer.
- Torrin Lawrence, 25, American track and field athlete, traffic collision.
- Yvette Lebon, 103, French actress.
- Alakbar Mammadov, 84, Azerbaijani Soviet football player and manager.
- Paul D. McGowan, 67, American politician, member of the Maine House of Representatives (since 2012), suicide.
- Al Paul, 88, American football and lacrosse coach.
- Johnny Rebb, 79, Australian rock and roll singer.
- Shahid Sajjad, 77–78, Pakistani sculptor.
- James Shigeta, 85, American actor (Flower Drum Song, Die Hard, Mulan).
- Ed Sprinkle, 90, American football player (Chicago Bears).
- Benedict L. Stabile, 86, American vice admiral, Vice Commandant of the United States Coast Guard (1972–1986).
- Axel Stoll, 65, German geophysicist and conspiracy theorist.
- Vladlen Trostyansky, 79, Ukrainian Olympic wrestler.
- Theodore Van Kirk, 93, American military officer, Army Major, navigator and last surviving crew member on the Enola Gay.
- Bill Walsh, 90, English footballer (Sunderland).

=== 29 ===
- Graham Burkett, 77, Australian politician.
- Jon R. Cavaiani, 70, American NCO and prisoner of war, Army Special Forces sergeant major, recipient of the Medal of Honor (1974).
- Jim Cox, 93, American football player (San Francisco 49ers).
- John Frechette, 71, American football player (Green Bay Packers, Boston Patriots), complications from Alzheimer's disease.
- Giorgio Gaslini, 84, Italian pianist and composer, complications from a fall.
- María Antonia Iglesias, 69, Spanish writer and journalist.
- Hashmat Karzai, Afghan-American policy advisor, security and construction executive, bombing.
- Umar Khan, 39, Sierra Leonean physician, chief virologist in charge of the ebola epidemic, ebola.
- Péter Kiss, 55, Hungarian politician, Minister of Social Affairs (2006–2007), member of the National Assembly (since 1994).
- Sadanam Divakara Marar, 77, Indian percussionist.
- L.A. Meyer, 72, American young adult author (Bloody Jack), lymphoma.
- Idris Muhammad, 74, American jazz drummer.
- Tom Patsalis, 92, American track and field athlete.
- Thomas R. St. George, 94, American author, reporter, editor and columnist.
- Janet L. Wolff, 94, American advertising executive.
- Michael Zinni, 65, American golfer and coach, lung infection.

=== 30 ===
- Dave Bakenhaster, 69, American baseball player (St. Louis Cardinals).
- Ted Bourke, 88, Australian footballer.
- Jacob Bunka, 91, Lithuanian sculptor.
- Martin Copley, 74, British-born Australian conservationist (Australian Wildlife Conservancy).
- Robert Drew, 90, American documentary filmmaker (Primary, Crisis: Behind a Presidential Commitment).
- Fausto Fanti, 35, Brazilian humorist (Hermes & Renato) and guitarist (Massacration), suicide by hanging.
- Harun Farocki, 70, German filmmaker.
- Bhairab Ganguli, 82, Indian cricket umpire.
- Julio Grondona, 82, Argentine football executive, President of AFA (since 1979), Senior Vice-President of FIFA, aortic aneurysm.
- Finn Gundersen, 81, Norwegian footballer (Skeid, Hellas Verona).
- Sir Peter Hall, 82, British urban planner, academic, government adviser and writer, conceptual developer of enterprise zones.
- Dennis Lipscomb, 72, American actor (In the Heat of the Night, Wiseguy, WarGames).
- Harrison Lobdell Jr., 90, American Air Force major general.
- Rick Mittleman, 84, American television writer (The Red Skelton Show, Gomer Pyle, U.S.M.C., CHiPs), traffic collision.
- Gomolemo Motswaledi, 44, Botswanan politician, traffic collision.
- Shūsei Nakamura, 79, Japanese voice actor (Ashita no Joe, Space Battleship Yamato, Attack No. 1).
- Ronald Charles Newman, 82, British physicist.
- Manfred Roeder, 85, German extreme-right activist and Wehrmacht soldier.
- Dick Smith, 92, American special effects make-up artist (The Godfather, The Exorcist, Amadeus), Oscar winner (1985).
- Dick Wagner, 71, American rock guitarist (The Frost, Alice Cooper, Lou Reed) and songwriter ("Only Women Bleed"), lung infection.

=== 31 ===
- János Bencze, 79, Hungarian Olympic basketball player.
- Warren Bennis, 89, American educator, scholar and author, President of the University of Cincinnati (1971–1977).
- Nabarun Bhattacharya, 66, Indian author, cancer.
- Jeff Bourne, 66, English footballer (Derby County, Crystal Palace), motor neurone disease.
- Wilfred Feinberg, 94, American judge, member (1966–1991) and Chief Judge (1980–1988) for the U.S. 2nd Circuit Court of Appeals.
- Jim Frederick, 42, American author and magazine editor (Time), cardiac arrest and arrhythmia.
- Franciszek Gąsienica Groń, 82, Polish Nordic skier, Olympic bronze medalist (1956).
- Kenny Ireland, 68, Scottish actor (Benidorm), brain cancer.
- Jorge Jacobson, 78, Argentine journalist and news reader (Telefe Noticias), heart attack.
- King Robbo, 44, English underground graffiti artist, complications from a head injury.
- Mukku Raju, 83, Indian Nandi Award-winning actor (1940 Lo Oka Gramam).
- Khenpo Kyosang Rinpoche, 63, Tibetan Buddhist teacher.
