= Insunza =

Insunza is a surname. Notable people with the surname include:

- Jorge Insunza Becker (1936–2019), Chilean politician
- Sergio Insunza (1919–2014), Chilean lawyer, politician, and human rights activist
