= Enneking =

Enneking is a surname. Notable people with the surname include:

- John Joseph Enneking (1841–1916), American painter
- Mike Enneking (born 1962), American soccer player
- William F. Enneking (1926–2014), American orthopaedic oncologist
