= Reiber =

Reiber is a German surname. Notable people with the surname include:

- Brent Reiber (born 1966), Swiss ice hockey referee
- Carolin Reiber (born 1940), German television presenter
- Frank Reiber (1909–2002), nicknamed "Tubby", American baseball player
- John Ney Rieber American comic book writer
- Lucas Reiber (born 1993), German actor
- Ludwig Reiber (1904–1979), German art director
- Nathan Reiber (1927-2014), Polish born Canadian American real estate developer, tax evader and developer of a condo in Surfside, Florida that collapsed in 2021
- Paul Reiber, (born 1947) American Chief Justice on the Vermont Supreme Court
- Willy Reiber, (1895–1980), German film director, producer and set designer

== See also ==
- GC Rieber a Norwegian corporation
