= List of Seattle Mariners owners and executives =

This is a list of owners and executives of the Seattle Mariners Major League Baseball club since its inception as an expansion team in 1977.

== Owners ==
| Name | Years |
|---|---|
| Stanley Golub, Danny Kaye, Walter Schoenfeld, Lester Smith, James Stillwell Jr. and James A. Walsh | 1976–1981 |
| George Argyros | 1981–1989 |
| Jeff Smulyan, Emmis Broadcasting, Michael Browning and the Morgan Stanley Group, Inc., with Smulyan as chairman | 1989–1992 |
| Nintendo of America, represented by CEO Howard Lincoln | 1992–2016 |
| Baseball Club of Seattle, represented by CEO John Stanton | 2016–present |

== President of Baseball Operations ==
| Name | Years |
|---|---|
| Jerry Dipoto | 2021— |

== General managers ==
| Name | Years |
|---|---|
| Dick Vertlieb | 1977—1978 |
| Lou Gorman | 1979—1980 |
| Dan O'Brien Sr. | 1981—1982 |
| Hal Keller | 1983—1985 |
| Dick Balderson | 1986—1988 |
| Woody Woodward | 1989—1999 |
| Pat Gillick | 2000—2003 |
| Bill Bavasi | 2003—2008 |
| Lee Pelekoudas (interim) | 2008 |
| Jack Zduriencik | 2008—2015 |
| Jerry Dipoto | 2015—2021 |
| Justin Hollander | 2022— |

== Other executives ==
- Chuck Armstrong
- John Boles
- Mel Didier
- Kevin Mather
- Dan O'Brien Jr.
- Reggie Waller

== See also ==
- List of Seattle Mariners managers
