= Bundschuh (surname) =

Bundschuh (from German: Bund "alliance" (in this context "lace", "thong") plus Schuh "shoe") is a German surname derived from an ensign of uprising peasants in the late 15th and early 16th century in southwestern Germany. Notable people with the name include:

- Eva-Maria Bundschuh (born 1941), German operatic soprano
- Werner Bundschuh (born 1951), Austrian historian, author and teacher
- Waltraud Bundschuh (1928–2014), German politician

== See also ==
- Bundschuh movement
