= Zinni =

Zinni is a surname. Notable people with the surname include:

- Andrew Zinni (born 1965), Australian soccer player
- Anthony Zinni (born 1943), United States Marine Corps general and writer
- Michael Zinni (1948–2014), American golfer
- Stefan Zinni (born 1996), Australian soccer player
