= Ralph Thompson =

Ralph Thompson may refer to:

- Ralph Thompson (footballer) (1892–1916), English amateur footballer
- Ralph Thompson (illustrator) (1913–2009), British artist and book illustrator
- Ralph Thompson (poet) (born 1928), Jamaican businessman, educational activist, artist and poet
- Ralph C. Thompson (c. 1947–2014), Canadian judge and lawyer
- Ralph Gordon Thompson (born 1934), United States federal judge
- Sir Ralph Wood Thompson (1830–1902), British civil servant
- Smack Thompson (Ralph Sandford Thompson, 1900–1981), college football player
