= Bert Waits =

- Born: Bert Kerr Waits II; 21 December 1940
- Died: 27 July 2014 (aged 73); Orlando, Florida, USA
- Resting place: Gahanna, Ohio
- Education: BS (1962), MS (1964), Ph.D. (1969), all from The Ohio State University
- Known for: co-founder of Teachers Teaching with Technology; co-author of the NCTM’s 1989 Curriculum and Evaluation Standards for School Mathematics; co-founder of the International Conference on Technology in Collegiate Mathematics (ICTCM); co-founder of the International Conference on Technology in Mathematics Teaching (ICTMT)
- Spouse: Barbara Jean Finley
- Children: 5
- Awards: Glenn Gilbert Award; Christopherson-Fawcett Award
- Scientific career
- Fields: Mathematics Education
- Workplaces: Ohio State University

Bert Kerr "Hank" Waits II (December 21, 1940 - July 27, 2014) was an American mathematician and professor at The Ohio State University where he taught in the Mathematics Department from 1961 to 1991. He was also a consultant to Texas Instruments, Education Technology Division, and a mathematics textbook author.

In 1986 Bert Waits and Franklin Demana founded the international network Teachers Teaching with Technology (T³), followed by the annual International Conference on Technology in Collegiate Mathematics (ICTCM), and in 1993 the European biennial International Conference on Technology in Mathematics Teaching (ICTMT)

His mantra was ’’The power of visualization’’ which he shared in over 200 invitation lectures worldwide from 1988 to 2006.

== Publications (selection) ==
- Precalculus: Graphical, Numerical, Algebraic, Pearson, 2010, ISBN 978-0321656933
- Calculus: Graphical, Numerical, Algebraic, Prentice Hall, 2021, ISBN 978-0133178579
- Geometry, Holt McDougal, 2011, ISBN 978-0547646992
