= National War College =

School in the National Defense University

Coordinates: 38°51′48″N 77°01′01″W

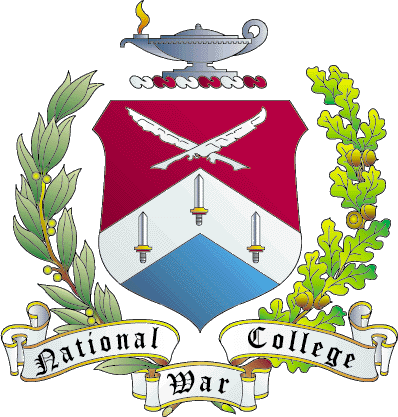
- Shield of the National War College
- Type: Federal staff college War college
- Established: July 1, 1946
- Parent institution: National Defense University
- Location: Fort Lesley J. McNair; Washington, D.C., United States
- Commandant: MG Jason L. Morris, USMC
- Mascot: Warrior
- Website: nwc.ndu.edu

The National War College (NWC) is a school within the United States' National Defense University. It is housed in Roosevelt Hall on Fort Lesley J. McNair, Washington, D.C., the third-oldest Army post still active.

== History ==
The National War College (NWC) was officially established on July 1, 1946, as an upgraded replacement for the Army-Navy Staff College, which operated from June 1943 to July 1946. The college was one of James Forrestal's favorite causes.

According to Lt. Gen. Leonard T. Gerow, President of the Board that recommended its formation:

The College is concerned with grand strategy and the utilization of the national resources necessary to implement that strategy. ... Its graduates will exercise a great influence on the formulation of national and foreign policy in both peace and war. ...

Mid-level and senior military officers who are likely to be promoted to the senior ranks are selected to study at the War College to prepare for higher staff and command positions. About 75 percent of the student body is composed of equal representation from the land, air, and sea (including Marine and Coast Guard) services. The remaining 25 percent are drawn from the Department of State and other federal departments and agencies. In addition, international fellows from several countries join the student body. The curriculum is based upon critical analysis of strategic problem solving with an emphasis on strategic leadership. As of the 2014–2015 academic year, the curriculum was based upon a core standard throughout National Defense University.

Because of the NWC's proximity to the White House, the Supreme Court, and Capitol Hill, it has been able to call upon an array of speakers. All lectures at the National War College are conducted under a strict "no quotation nor attribution" policy, which has facilitated discussion on some issues of the day.

== Commandants ==
1. Vice Admiral Harry W. Hill (June 1946–1949)
2. Lieutenant General Harold R. Bull (1949–1952)
3. Lieutenant General Harold A. Craig (1952–1955)
4. Vice Admiral Edmund T. Wooldridge (1955–1958)
5. Lieutenant General Thomas L. Harrold (1958–1961)
6. Lieutenant General Francis H. Griswold (1961–1964)
7. Vice Admiral Fitzhugh Lee III (1964–1967)
8. Lieutenant General Andrew Goodpaster (1967–1968)
9. Lieutenant General John E. Kelly (1968–1970)
10. Lieutenant General John B. McPherson (1970–1973)
11. Vice Admiral Marmaduke G. Bayne (1973–1975)
12. Major General James S. Murphy (1975–1976)
13. Major General Harrison Lobdell Jr. (1976–1978)
14. Rear Admiral John C. Barrow (1978–1980)
15. Major General Lee E. Surut (1980–1983)
16. Major General Perry M. Smith (1983–1986)
17. Rear Admiral John F. Addams (1986–1989)
18. Major General Gerald P. Stadler (1989–1992)
19. Major General John C. Fryer Jr. (1992–1995)
20. Rear Admiral Michael McDevitt (1995–1997)
21. Rear Admiral Thomas Marfiak (1997–1999)
22. Rear Admiral Daniel R. Bowler (1999–2000)
23. Major General Reginal G. Clemmons (2000–2003)
24. Rear Admiral Richard D. Jaskot (2003–2006)
25. Major General Teresa Marné Peterson (2006–2007)
26. Major General Robert P. Steel (2007–2010)
27. Rear Admiral Douglas J. McAneny (2011–2013)
28. Brigadier General Guy "Tom" Cosentino (2013–2015)
29. Brigadier General Darren E. Hartford (2015–2017)
30. Brigadier General Chad T. Manske (2017–2019)
31. Rear Admiral Cedric E. Pringle (2019–2021)
32. Brigadier General Jeff H. Hurlbert (2021–2023)
33. Major General Paul J. Rock Jr. (2023–2024)
34. Rear Admiral Chase D. Patrick (2024-2026)
35. Major General Jason L. Morris (2026-present)

Source for commandants up to 2010.

== Alumni and influence ==
American graduates of the National War College include a secretary of state and a secretary of defense, national security advisors, a senator and congressman, and a White House chief of staff, in addition to chairmen of the joint chiefs of staff and numerous other current and former flag officers, general officers, and U.S. ambassadors. No other graduate institution of national security policy in the world has had more impact in the development of the United States senior cadre of national security leaders. Graduates from other countries include prime ministers from nations as diverse as Iran and Bulgaria, as well as many national military leaders from every continent on earth except Antarctica. Notable graduates include:

--A--

- John R. Allen, retired Marine Corps General, president of the Brookings Institution
- David W. Allvin, general and vice chief of staff of the United States Air Force
- Gholam Reza Azhari, prime minister of Iran

--B--

- Robert H. Barrow, 27th Commandant of the Marine Corps
- Edward L. Beach Jr., World War II submarine officer and best-selling novelist
- William B. Black, Jr., deputy director National Security Agency
- John Beyrle, U.S. Ambassador to Russia
- Arnold W. Braswell, retired Air Force General
- Bernard Brodie, one of the initial nuclear theorists
- William Brownfield, U.S. Ambassador to Venezuela, Chile, and Colombia

--C--

- Richard D. Clarke U.S. army general, commander, special operations command
- Wesley Clark, former NATO Supreme Allied Commander Europe
- Bernard A. Clarey, U.S. admiral
- Donna L. Crisp, U.S. rear admiral
- Julia Curlee, CIA officer and member of the National Security Council

--D--

- Raymond G. Davis, 14th Assistant Commandant of the Marine Corps
- Eugene Peyton Deatrick, USAF general
- Martin Dempsey, former Chairman of the Joint Chiefs of Staff
- R. Scott Dingle, U.S. army general 45th surgeon general of the United States Army
- Archer L. Durham, major general, first African American to command an Air Force Logistics Center

--F--

- John D. Feeley, U.S. ambassador

--G--

- Charles A. Gillespie Jr., U.S. ambassador to Colombia
- Alan L. Gropman, military officer, author, and academic

--H--

- Mark P. Hertling USA Lieutenant General, Commander of US Army in Europe
- Eric T. Hill, U.S.A.F major general

--J--

- David C. Jones, Chairman of the Joint Chiefs of Staff
- James L. Jones, 32nd Commandant of the Marine Corps, 14th NATO Supreme Allied Commander Europe, 21st National Security Advisor
- Lincoln Jones, commander of United States V Corps

--K--

- John F. Kelly, retired Marine Corps General, 28th White House chief of staff
- Kristie Kenney, U.S. ambassador to Thailand and to the Philippines
- Donald Keyser, State Department China expert accused of espionage
- Mark Kimmitt, assistant secretary of state for politico-military affairs, the State Department
- Charles C. Krulak, 31st Commandant of the Marine Corps

--L--

- Bruce Laingen, U.S. ambassador to Malta, American hostage in Iranian Hostage Crisis
- Jeannie Leavitt, first female U.S.A.F. fighter pilot, general
- Homer Litzenberg, Marine Corps Lieutenant General

--M--

- James Mattis, Marine Corps General, 5th Commander of the United States Joint Forces Command, 11th Commander of the United States Central Command, 26th Secretary of Defense
- John McCain, former U.S. Senator
- Robert McFarlane, National Security Advisor under president Ronald Reagan
- Thomas McInerney, U.S.A.F lieutenant general
- Merrill A. McPeak, former U.S.A.F Chief of Staff
- Godfrey McHugh, former military aide to President John F. Kennedy

--N--

- Lucien Nedzi, U.S. congressman
- Richard Norland U.S. ambassador to Libya

--O--

- Robin Olds, brigadier general, "triple ace" in World War II and Vietnam

--P--

- Peter Pace, Marine Corps General, 6th Vice Chairman of the Joint Chiefs of Staff, 16th Chairmen of the Joint Chiefs of Staff
- Donald Parsons former US Military Attaché to Canada
- Andika Perkasa, commander, Indonesian National Armed Forces
- Paul D. Phillips, former oldest living West Point graduate
- Czesław Piątas, chief of general staff, Polish army
- Colin Powell, former U.S. Secretary of State and Chairman of the Joint Chiefs of Staff
- Edward Pietrzyk, commander in chief, Polish land forces, two-time Polish ambassador

--R--

- John M. Richardson, admiral, 31st chief of naval operations
- Robert C. Richardson III, brigadier general, principal in the Laconia incident

--S--

- Beth Sanner, deputy director of national intelligence
- Norton A. Schwartz, former U.S. Air Force Chief of Staff
- Dorothy Shea U.S. ambassador to Lebanon
- Robert Lee Scott Jr., USAF brigadier general and fighter ace
- Hugh Shelton, former Chairman of the Joint Chiefs of Staff
- Abraham Sinkov, U.S. cryptanalyst and NSA official
- Eric Shinseki, former U.S. Army Chief of Staff and Secretary of Veterans Affairs
- Jay B. Silveria, superintendent, United States Air Force Academy
- James G. Stavridis former Supreme Allied Commander Europe, admiral, U.S. Navy
- J. Christopher Stevens, the late U.S. Ambassador to Libya
- Stephanie S. Sullivan, U.S. ambassador to Ghana
- James C. Swan, United Nations secretary general's special representative for Somalia

--W--

- Mark Welsh, USAF general
- Cedric T. Wins, U.S. army general

--Y--

- Donald Yamamoto, U.S. ambassador to Somalia
- Stefan Yanev, prime minister of Bulgaria
- Marie Yovanovitch U.S. ambassador to Ukraine

--Z--

- Anthony Zinni, Marine Corps General, 6th Commander, United States Central Command
- Elmo Zumwalt, former U.S. Chief of Naval Operations
- James P. Zumwalt, U.S. ambassador to Senegal

== Roosevelt Hall ==
Roosevelt Hall (built 1903–1907) is a Beaux Arts–style building housing the NWC since its inception in 1946. Designed by the New York architectural firm McKim, Mead & White, it is now designated a National Historic Landmark. It is listed on the National Register of Historic Places.

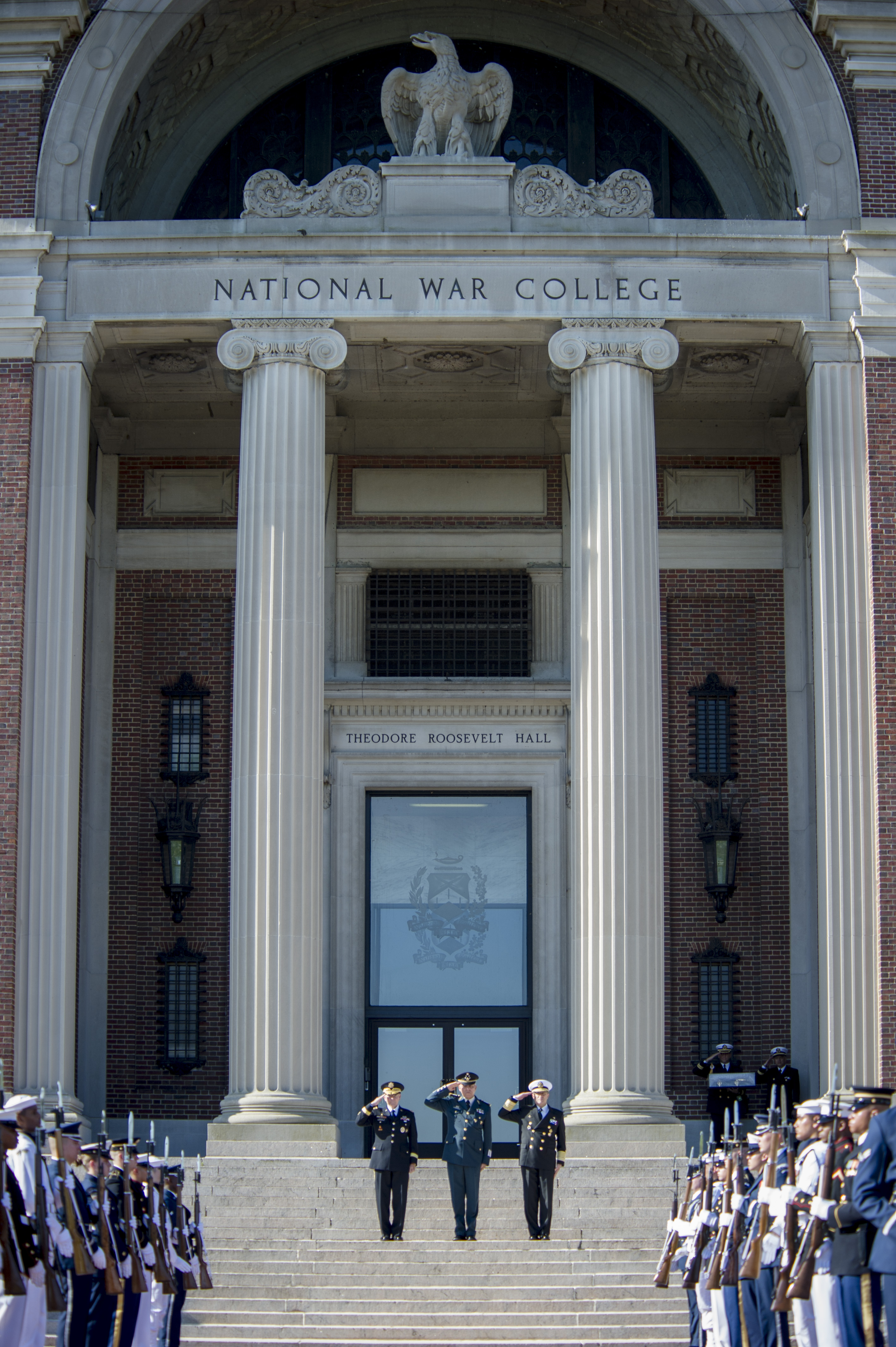
Roosevelt Hall of National War College

== See also ==
- USAF Air War College
- Dwight D. Eisenhower School for National Security and Resource Strategy
- List of National Historic Landmarks in the District of Columbia
- Marine Corps War College
- National Register of Historic Places listings in the District of Columbia
- Naval War College
- United States Army War College
