= Musculoskeletal Tumor Surgery =

- Author: William F. Enneking
- Published: 1983
- Publisher: Churchill Livingstone
- ISBN: 9780443080920

Musculoskeletal Tumor Surgery is a non-fiction book about bone and soft tissue tumors. It was written by William F. Enneking, a tutor and orthopedic oncologist. It was first published by Churchill Livingstone in 1983.

This book is primarily directed towards orthopedic surgeons specializing in musculoskeletal tumor surgery.

== Contents ==
The book delves into the various aspects of musculoskeletal tumor surgery, offering a detailed exploration of diagnostic techniques, surgical principles, and treatment modalities. It covers a wide array of musculoskeletal tumors, providing insights into both benign and malignant conditions. It also includes surgical approaches and tumor classification, with limited information about non-surgical cancer treatments, such as chemotherapy.
