= Je Tsongkapay Ling =

Je Tsongkapay Ling (Tib. rje tsong kha pa'i rig pa’i ‘byung gnas gling in Wylie transliteration mode, name before 2014 - Je Tsongkhapa Ling) is a Buddhist College and Home Retirement (Retreat Center), founded in 2001 by a Tibetan lama Khenpo Kyosang Rinpoche. It is incorporated in the United Kingdom as Je Tsongkapay Ling Buddhist College under company number 09252243. The college provides classes in Lamrim, Abhidharma, Madhyamaka, Vinaya, Prajna Paramita, Pramana, and Tibetan language.
