= Halima Rafiq =

Pakistani cricketer

Personal information
- Born: 23 March 1997; Multan, Punjab, Pakistan
- Died: 13 July 2014 (aged 17); Multan, Punjab, Pakistan
- Source: CricketArchive

Halima Rafiq (Urdu: حلیمہ رفیق; 23 March 1997 – 13 July 2014) was a Pakistani cricketer from Multan, Punjab, Pakistan. Rafiq accused Multan Cricket Club chairman Maulvi Muhammad Sultan Alam Ansari of sexual harassment during a cricket match in Multan Cricket Stadium, for which she was backed by her female teammates but was thereafter sued by Alam Ansari for ₨20 million. She died after ingesting acid on 13 July 2014.

== Career ==
=== Sexual harassment allegations ===
Rafiq made a claim during a cricket match that she had been a victim of sexual harassment at the hands of her recruiters. The alleged perpetrator was Maulvi Muhammad Sultan Alam Ansari, who is a 70-year-old lawyer, former judge, and member of the Provincial Assembly of the Punjab from MPA elected from the PP-161 from Multan with Pakistan Muslim League (N) ticket. She claimed that Alam Ansari, along with team selector Mohammad Javed, demanded sexual favours in return for nominating her for both the regional and national cricket teams. Raifiq then stated she was since being threatened for highlighting the issue of sexual harassment in women's sports brought onto them by their recruiters. In 2013, Rafiq, Seema Javed, Hina Ghafoor, Kiran Irshad and Saba Ghafoor claimed that they were being threatened, intimidated, and harassed by the Multan Cricket Board.

Alam Ansari subsequently sued Rafiq for ₨20 million for making false accusations and attempted defamation.

== Death ==
On Sunday, 13 July 2014, Rafiq killed herself by ingesting acid, two days after receiving notice that Alam Ansari had named her in a defamation suit. Muhammad Rafiq, father of Halima, accused Multan Cricket Board officials (including Alam Ansari) of sexually harassing teenage female players during Cricket camp training. Rashid Rafiq, brother of Halima, accused Nishtar Hospital for negligence since emergency room doctors did not pump her stomach of the acid and instead released her after 2 hours in the hospital.

== See also ==
- Pakistan Cricket Board
- Pakistan national women's cricket team
- List of Pakistan women ODI cricketers
