= Jerzy Żyszkiewicz =

Polish politician

member of Sejm 2005-2007
- Incumbent
- Assumed office 25 September 2005

Personal details
- Born: 17 January 1950 Oleśnica
- Died: 12 July 2014 (aged 64) Wrocław
- Party: Samoobrona

Jerzy Żyszkiewicz (17 January 1950 – 12 July 2014) was a Polish politician. He was elected to the Sejm on 25 September 2005, receiving 10527 votes in the 3 Wrocław district as a candidate from the Samoobrona Rzeczpospolitej Polskiej list.

== See also ==
- Members of the Polish Sejm 2005-2007
