= Jimmy Hedges =

American wood carver and art dealer

- Born: James R. Hedges III; 1942
- Died: July 13, 2014 (aged 71); Rising Fawn, Georgia, U.S.
- Movement: Outsider art, Folk art

James R. Hedges III (1942–2014) was an American wood carver and art dealer. He produced and dealt in art primarily of the Folk and Outsider genres, and was the founder of the Rising Fawn Folk Art Gallery.

== Early life ==
Jimmy Hedges was born into a Tennessee industrialist family in 1942. His first profession was in the real estate industry, and he was also a trustee of the Tonya Foundation, which was founded by his grandfather. Hedges became a self-taught chainsaw woodcarver, and later a dealer/gallerist for other self-taught artists in the medium. He came upon the artform after taking a bet from folk artist Homer Green, who challenged him to see if he could do it. He later showed his carvings to a gallerist in Memphis, who encouraged him to start incorporating folk art into his repertoire. He then also began working in the genre of Outsider Art.

== Art career ==
Hedges' work incorporated people and places that he encountered while exploring different parts of the United States. Hedges also engaged with social commentary, such as incorporating the figure of a Klansman with trousers that reflected that the person beneath the sheets was likely a law enforcement officer. His folk art additionally incorporated folk narratives he encountered during his travels. Most of his carvings are created from cedar wood. Hedges exhibited his work at festivals including the Outsiders Outside Art Fair, as well as the Intui's Collectorama in Chicago, and Folk Fest in Atlanta.

== Rising Fawn Folk Art ==
As a dealer, Hedges sold his work and those of other artists through the Rising Fawn Folk Art Gallery. Artists represented by Rising Fawn included Jimmy Lee Sudduth, Purvis Young, and Charles Simmons. The gallery was founded near Chattanooga, Tennessee, on the Georgian side of Lookout Mountain, and exhibited the work of their artists in surrounding urban centers. Hedges actively promoted the artists with fliers and other printed materials, and sold their work at festivals. Hedges would hand deliver much of the work purchased through his gallery, and travelled the countryside visiting other artists in order to obtain their newest work. Adjacent to the gallery Hedges also ran the Rising Fawn Folk Art Sculpture Garden. He represented more than four hundred artists during his career.

Many of the artists that Hedges represented were disabled in some manner, some mentally ill and others physically impaired. He also represented artists serving time in prison. The archives and papers of Hedges' personal records and the gallery became a part of the Smithsonian Archives of American Art in 2016, two years after his death. The work contained within the collection includes work from 1980 through 2014, as well as photographs covering the work and artists of his gallery and the art shows he attended over the span of his career.

== Personal life ==
Jimmy Hedges lived most of his life in Rising Fawn, Georgia near Lookout Mountain. He was married twice. In 2014 Hedges died in a drowning incident on his property.
