= Kristina Fetters =

American murderer

Kristina Joy Fetters (February 5, 1980 – July 27, 2014) was an Iowa woman who was convicted of the murder of her 73-year-old great-aunt, Arlene Klehm, on October 25, 1994, when she was 14 years old. At age 15, Fetters became the youngest female in Iowa sentenced to life in prison without parole on December 18, 1995. Following the 2012 Supreme Court decision of Miller v. Alabama, which declared mandatory life sentences for juvenile offenders to be unconstitutional, Fetters became the first inmate in Iowa to be re-sentenced in November 2013. The following month, she was recommended for compassionate parole due to a prognosis of inoperable stage-four breast cancer, and she was released to a hospice care center in Des Moines, Iowa in December 2013. She succumbed to her cancer in July 2014, at age 34.

== Murder ==
In January 1994, Kristina Fetters was sent to Orchard Place, an unlocked facility in Des Moines for children with behavioral or mental health problems, and she was put on Prozac. On October 25, 1994, the morning of the murder, Fetters and her roommate, Jeanie Fox, escaped from the facility and hitchhiked to her great-aunt Arlene Klehm's home in northern Polk County, Iowa. Allegedly, Fetters had previously discussed with other girls at Orchard Place about her plan to rob and kill her great-aunt. When Fetters and Fox arrived at Klehm's home, the young girls waited for visitors to leave before entering the home. Once inside the home, Fetters reportedly struck Klehm on the head with a frying pan, then attempted to slit Klehm's throat before stabbing her in the back with a paring knife. The two girls attempted to rob the house, but after being unable to find the keys to the safe or Klehm's truck, they left the scene. After police were called to the house, they discovered the murder, and Kristina Fetters was arrested that night and confessed to the crime.

Fetters was ultimately charged with first-degree murder and her case was transferred from the juvenile court to district court, and she was tried as an adult. She pleaded insanity, arguing that she did not understand the full consequences of her actions, but a prosecution psychologist argued she carefully planned the killing. This was corroborated by the testimony of three residents of Orchard Place, including Jeanie Fox. After a day of deliberation, a Polk County jury convicted Kristina Fetters of first-degree murder. On December 18, 1995, she received the mandatory sentence of life in prison without parole under Iowa state law.

== Prison ==
Fetters served her sentence at the Iowa Correctional Institution for Women in Mitchellville, Iowa. She filed appeals of her conviction, but they were denied. In 2008, Fetters' attorneys filed a petition challenging her life sentence, arguing cruel and unusual punishment that was in violation of the Constitution and Iowa state law. In 2010, the case Graham v. Florida noted that key differences between children and adults must be considered in sentencing, citing brain research studies have shown that teenagers' brains continue to develop into their early twenties. In Fetters' case, she had been abandoned by her father, causing psychological trauma. Klehm herself was a disciplinarian towards Fetters, and apologized in a letter. Most significantly, Fetters was abducted by a 23-year-old when she was 14, and subsequently beaten, raped repeatedly, and abused. Two years later, the case Miller v. Alabama banned mandatory life sentences without parole for juveniles. In 2013, as Fetters was preparing for a new sentencing hearing, she became gravely ill and was diagnosed with inoperable breast cancer.

== Later life and death ==
In November 2013, Kristina Fetters was re-sentenced by a Polk County judge to life in prison with the possibility of parole. The judge also recommended that Fetters be immediately paroled due to her illness. In December 2013, the Iowa Parole Board voted to release Fetters on hospice-only parole. She became the first juvenile who was convicted of murder and sentenced to life in prison who was released. After seven months in hospice care, Fetters succumbed to her cancer on July 27, 2014; she died at age 34.
