= Fritz Naef =

Swiss ice hockey player

- Born: June 5, 1934; Davos, Switzerland
- Died: July 27, 2014 (aged 80); Switzerland
- Position: Right Wing
- Shot: Left
- Played for: HC Davos; Lausanne HC; HC Genève-Servette
- National team: Switzerland
- Playing career: 1954–1974

Fritz Naef (June 5, 1934 – July 27, 2014) was a Swiss former ice hockey player who competed for the Swiss national team at the 1956 Winter Olympics in Cortina d'Ampezzo.

== Professional career ==
Naef joined the National League A in 1949 and played his entire career in Switzerland:

- HC Davos 1949–1954
- HC Lausanne 1954–1959
- HC Servette (later as HC Genève-Servette) 1959–1969

== International career ==
Naef appeared in 4 World Championships and at one Olympics.

== Retirement ==
Naed's number was retired on 25 September 2004 and died in 2014.
