= Jane Richardson Hanks =

American anthropologist

- Born: August 2, 1908; Berkeley, California, US
- Died: July 27, 2014; North Bennington, Vermont, US
- Education: PhD
- Known for: anthropology
- Spouse: Lucien Hanks

Jane Richardson Hanks (August 2, 1908 – July 27, 2014) was an American anthropologist particularly known for her work on Native American people and those of Southeast Asia.

== Biography ==
Hanks was born Jane Richardson on August 2, 1908, the daughter of Berkeley Latin professor Leon Josiah Richardson. She got her bachelor's degree in 1930 from the University of California, Berkeley. She then met Alfred Kroeber who encouraged her into the field of anthropology. He enrolled her in three undergraduate courses so that she could join the graduate program in anthropology in 1933. Hanks got her PhD from Columbia University in 1943. Although she defended her dissertation in 1938 on Kiowa law, an oversight caused the formal awarding to be delayed. Kroeber was an important mentor to her and she became his research assistant. He also arranged for her field work with Kiowa people and a travelling fellowship. It was this which took her to Columbia University, to study with Ruth Benedict. Her work on the upland tribal people of Thailand and the Akha women was considered pioneering. Hanks believed in the Boasian tenet, approaching anthropology by gathering the data and then producing theories rather than beginning with the theory. Hanks became a research associate at Cornell Research Center and was associate director of Bennington-Cornell Survey of Hill Tribes of North Thailand. She also served as the Peace Corps consultant on Thailand.

== Personal life ==
Hanks met her husband Lucien Mason Hanks on fieldwork. They worked in collaboration on a number of articles and books. The couple lived in Thailand while gaining data to write about its anthropology. They had three sons: Peter, Tobias and Nicholas. While the children were young Hanks was focused on them rather than her anthropology work. She had two great periods of output, before and after the children. Hanks was also a musician and played with her local orchestra. She died at home on July 27, 2014.

== Selected works ==
- Reflections on the ontology of rice., 1960
- With Lucien Hanks. Thailand: equality between the sexes., 1963
- With Lucien Hanks. Siamese Tai., 1964
- Recitation of patrilineages among the Akha.,1974
- Hill and valley peoples of Thailand's province of Chiangrai: a changing relationship., 1981
- With Lucien Hanks. Settling the Lisu in Thailand., 1987
- The power of Akha women., 1988
- The Confucian heritage among the tribes., 1990
- Changing configurations in the social organization of a Blackfoot tribe during the reserve period
- Ethnographic notes on northern Thailand
- Law and status among the Kiowa Indians, c1940
- Maternity and its rituals in Bang Chan
- Observations on Northern Blackfoot kinship
- Tender hearts of India
- Three centuries of women's dress fashions a quantitative analysis / by Jane Richardson and A. L. Kroeber. - Berkeley, 1940.
- Tribes of the North Thailand frontier
