= John Muller (cricketer) =

South African cricketer (1933–2014)

Personal information
- Born: 23 July 1933; Stutterheim, South Africa
- Died: 1 July 2014 (aged 80); Stutterheim, South Africa
- Source: Cricinfo, 18 April 2016

John Muller (23 July 1933 – 1 July 2014) was a South African cricketer. He played two first-class matches for Border in 1959/60.
