= Leopoldo Verona =

Argentine actor

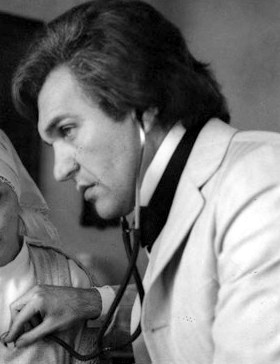
Leopoldo Verona in 1974.

Leopoldo Verona (24 September 1931 – 14 July 2014) was an Argentine actor. His best known film roles were in I Need a Mother (1966), On the Beach by the Sea (1971) and La flor de la mafia (1974). He was born in Buenos Aires.

Verona died on 14 July 2014 in Buenos Aires, aged 82.

== Other websites ==
- Leopoldo Verona at IMDb
