= Eugene F. Lally =

Eugene F. Lally (August 14, 1934 – July 28, 2014) was an American aerospace engineer. He worked in the early 1960s on U.S. interplanetary space programs. Beside his space programs he was also an inventor and developed non-space products with his own company Dynamic Development Co. which he founded in the early 1960s. He later became an active amateur photographer and lubrication product entrepreneur. Lally contributed articles for popular space, astrobiology, photography, travel, and archaeology magazines. He was also a speaker at local space exploration and extraterrestrial intelligence (UFO) society meetings where he gave first-hand accounts of the early U.S. space program, commentaries on current U.S. space exploration activities and the search for extraterrestrial intelligence.

== Personal life and education ==
Lally was born in South Boston, Massachusetts, in 1934. In his early days his mother gave him a Kodak Box camera which he loved and sparked his interest in photography. At the age of 14, when color film became available, he developed a way to reduce the red-eye problem caused by using strobes. His solution was printed in a photography magazine and his concept is used to this day. He received a bachelor's degree in electrical engineering from Northeastern University in 1957. Upon graduation he relocated to California to work in the early U.S. space program first at Convair in San Diego, California and then to JPL in Pasadena and finally to Space-General Corporation in El Monte. He submitted his last white paper to NASA in 1966 before permanently leaving the U.S. space program for other pursuits.

During his employment at Convair he had the chance to work with Krafft A. Ehricke, the famous German rocket scientist from Peenemünde. Lally continued to collaborate with him through space societies after Lally left to work for JPL. While on Ehricke's team he worked on the Atlas Mercury vehicle and designed the escape rocket system.

== Aerospace papers ==
While working at JPL and later at Convair, Lally wrote internal and space conference papers proposing various spacecraft designs and methods to explore the Moon, Mercury, Mars, and Jupiter. His last paper, a white paper for NASA Ames Research Center, was concerned with deep space communications for missions to Saturn, comets, asteroids, and solar system escape. He claims that this paper lead to direct TV satellite broadcasting such as DirecTV. Lally claims that he proposed crewed mars missions using nuclear propulsion stages and designed optical guidance and navigation for astronauts' on-board use. Lally proposed gravity simulation for crewed Mars missions in an article he wrote for 1962 space trade magazine. He contributed information to a newspaper article on the subject also.

Perhaps the most suggestive (in retrospect) of Lally's papers was an American Rocket Society conference paper presented in 1961 on "mosaic guidance", with related popular and trade magazine articles following in 1962. His proposal was an array of electro-optical sensors connected to an on-board "computer" that would provide autonomous navigation by tracking the relative movement of stars and planetary occultations during space flight and planetary landings. All modern spacecraft navigation systems, such as "AutoNav", are derived from his proposals. It was also the first presentation of a digital photography concept and digital camera design usable on spacecraft and for general photography. Lally is widely acknowledged for coining the words Digital Photography.

Lally's 1960s papers were forward looking and suggestive (in retrospect). His Mosaic Guidance paper was later reviewed by Bell Laboratories. Fairchild Semiconductor picked up Bell's work on imaging sensors and approached him in 1973 with a CCD and asked him to build a digital camera prototype according to his Mosaic Guidance proposal, Lally had to decline as he was too busy working on space programs, developing products with his company and other activities. Lally suggested they contact Kodak which they did and Kodak accepted.

== Later contributions ==
He is best known for a talk he gave at the SETI Institute in 2008 as part of their lecture series. In the talk he discussed the accomplishments of space pioneers: Robert Goddard, Hermann Oberth, Wernher von Braun, and Ehricke. Lally too made fundamental contributions to space exploration. Lally contributed articles to popular science print magazines and online publications on the subjects of extraterrestrial intelligence searches, space exploration and other topics.

Lally began contributing technical papers for amateur photography magazines in 2002. Later he began contributing photo-anthropology articles primarily focused on Native Americans in the United States.

From 2004 on Lally focused his work on household lubrication products that his company in California, Dynamic Development Co., produced. In the product promotional materials he stated that the products were developed in the early 1960s when he worked at JPL and at the same time he built and raced sports cars.
