= Ange Dellasantina =

French footballer (1933–2014)

Angeot "Ange" Dellasantina (4 November 1933 – 26 July 2014) was a French footballer who played as a defender.

== Biography ==
Dellasantina debuted professionally in 1954 with Arles-Avignon after doing military service in Avignon. A year later he signed with SC Bastia, and after one season transferred to Gazélec Ajaccio, with whom he remained until 1968, the year of his retirement. During his stay at the club went on to win the Championnat National four times.
