= Marlinde Massa =

German field hockey player

Marlinde Massa (7 July 1944 in Stuttgart – 2 July 2014 in Stuttgart) was a German field hockey player.

She played 17 international matches with German women's field hockey team, including the 1971 World Cup. With her club ESV Rot-Weiß Stuttgart she captured between 1963 and 1968 four German indoor titles.
