= Peter Mentz Jebsen =

Norwegian businessperson, athlete and politician

Peter Mentz Jebsen (21 June 1930 – 10 July 2014) was a Norwegian businessperson, athlete and politician.

He hailed from Kristiansand, and finished Kristiansand Cathedral School in 1950. As a young man he was an athlete specializing in 400 metres and 800 metres. He won the silver medal in this event at the 1952 Norwegian Championships, representing the club Kristiansands IF.

He took his business education in the United States, and worked in the textile industry there before taking over the family company Høie Fabrikker in 1965. He retired in 1990 as the company was bought. He was also chairman of Bergen Bank and Hotel Caledonien. He was also elected to Kristiansand city council in 1995, representing the Conservative Party. He died in 2014.
