= Julio Bernad =

Spanish footballer

Personal information
- Full name: Julio Bernad Valmaseda
- Date of birth: 17 October 1928
- Place of birth: Zaragoza, Spain
- Date of death: 9 July 2014 (aged 85)
- Position: Defender

Youth career
- Huesca
- 1953–1956: Real Zaragoza

Senior career*
Years	Team	Apps	(Gls)
1956–1958	Real Zaragoza	50	(0)
- * Club domestic league appearances and goals

Julio Bernad Valmaseda (17 October 1928 – 9 July 2014) was a Spanish professional footballer who played as a defender for Huesca and Real Zaragoza.
