= Paul Van Riper (political scientist) =

American political scientist

Paul P. Van Riper (July 29, 1916 – July 11, 2014) was an American political scientist and professor emeritus of political science at Texas A&M University's Department of Political Science and the George Bush School of Government and Public Service. The American Society for Public Administration honored Van Riper with the presentation of an annual award in his name for scholars who have made a significant contribution through his or her body of work to bridging the world of public administration scholarship and practice.

== Education and early career ==
Van Riper graduated from DePauw University in 1938 and earned a doctorate at the University of Chicago in 1946. His studies had been interrupted by his military service in World War II. Van Riper spent 22 years teaching at Cornell University, where he chaired the Cornell Social Science Center.

== Texas A&M ==
Van Riper began teaching at Texas A&M University in 1970. He served as head of the Department of Political Science from 1970 to 1977. He retired in 1981, but returned to the university in 1984, teaching courses on a part-time basis.

== Other academic appointments ==
Van Riper has also held faculty positions at George Washington University, Northwestern University and University of Strathclyde.

== Bibliography ==
- History of the United States Civil Service (1958) ISBN 0-8371-8755-9
