= Harrison Lobdell Jr. =

United States Air Force general

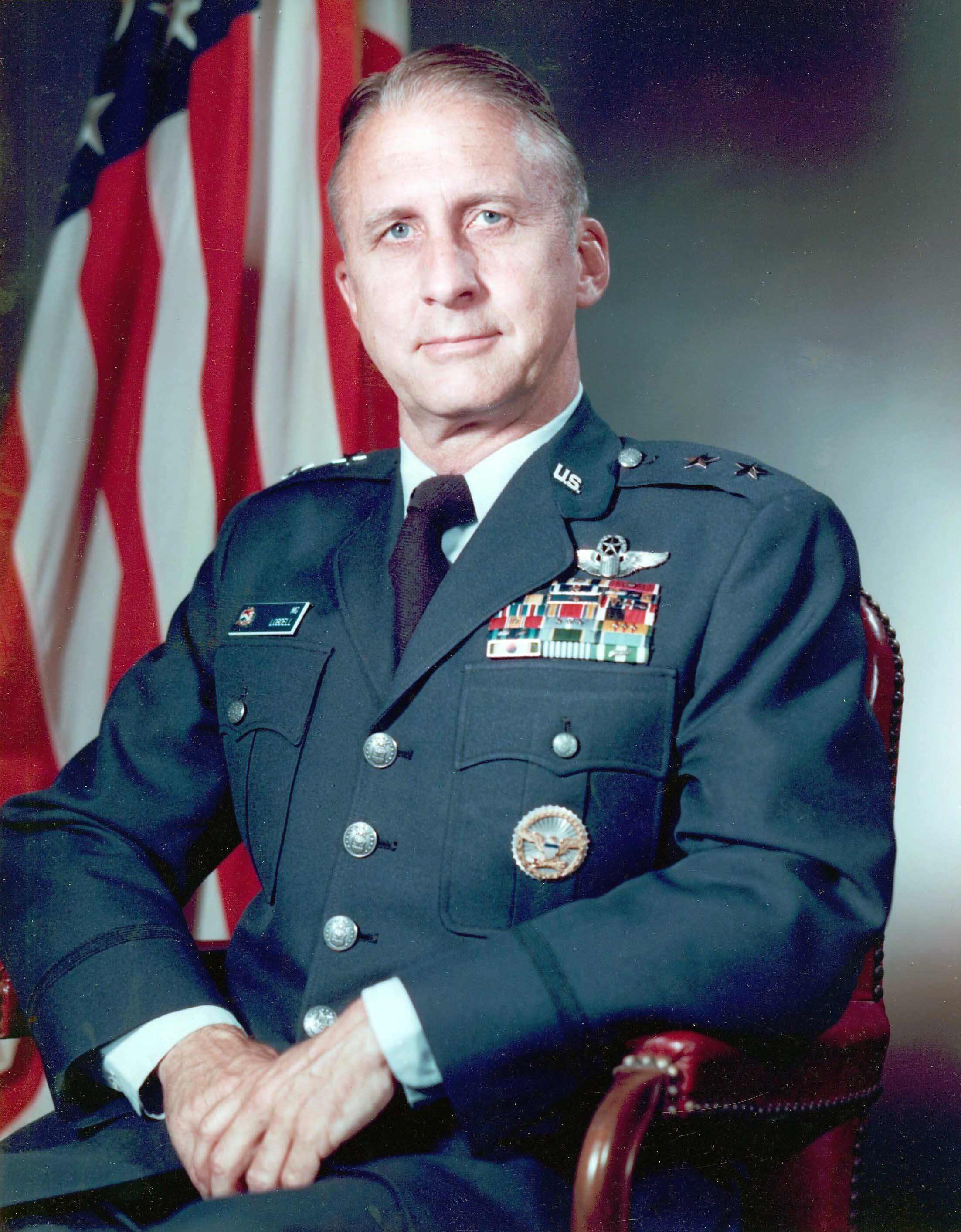
- Born: March 12, 1924; Los Angeles, California
- Died: July 30, 2014 (aged 90); San Antonio, Texas
- Military career
- Allegiance: United States of America
- Branch: United States Air Force
- Service years: 1946–1978
- Rank: Major General
- Commands: Eighth Air Force; Vice Commander-in-Chief, Strategic Air Command
- Awards: Distinguished Service Medal with oak leaf cluster, Legion of Merit with oak leaf cluster, Distinguished Flying Cross with oak leaf cluster, Air Medal with 12 oak leaf clusters, Air Force Commendation Medal, Distinguished Unit Citation Emblem, Air Force Outstanding Unit Award Ribbon, and the Republic of Korea Presidential Unit Citation Ribbon

Harrison Lobdell Jr. (March 12, 1924 – July 30, 2014) was an American Air Force major general who was commandant, National War College, National Defense University, Fort Lesley J. McNair, Washington, D.C. from 1976 to 1978.

== Biography ==
Lobdell was born in 1924, in Los Angeles, California. He graduated from high school at the New Mexico Military Institute at Roswell in 1941 and completed junior college in 1943. He graduated from the U.S. Military Academy, West Point, New York, in 1946 with a bachelor of science degree in military science and commission as a second lieutenant. He attended the Army Command and General Staff College in 1959, the Air War College in 1964, and received his master's degree in international affairs from The George Washington University in 1964.

After graduation from the academy, he entered flying school at Williams Field, Arizona, received his pilot wings in November 1946, then completed fighter pilot transition training. Lobdell next was assigned to the 162d Reconnaissance Squadron at Brooks Field, Texas, and later at Langley Field, Va., where he served as a photographic reconnaissance pilot and supply officer from November 1946 to September 1948.

He was transferred to the 8th Tactical Reconnaissance Squadron at Johnson Air Base, Japan, in September 1948. In his new assignment he served as photographic reconnaissance pilot, squadron adjutant, and personnel officer. In March 1949 he joined the 13th Bombardment Squadron, 3d Bombardment Group, at Yokota Air Base, Japan, and served as pilot, adjutant, training and armament officer, and flight commander. During the Korean War, as a member of the 13th BMS' famed "Grim Reapers" he led the first U.S. Air Force mission over North Korea as a B-26 Invader bomber pilot. He completed 60 missions over Korea as a night-intruder pilot.

In January 1951 Lobdell was transferred to Headquarters U.S. Air Force, Washington, D.C., as a night and electronic reconnaissance operations staff officer with the Directorate of Requirements, Deputy Chief of Staff, Research and Development. He served in this position until July 1954, when he was transferred to Shaw Air Force Base, S.C., as a reconnaissance pilot. In January 1955 he reported to the U.S. Air Force Academy, Colo., as deputy director for physical training. In August 1958 he was assigned as a student at the Army Command and General Staff College, Fort Leavenworth, Kan.

Lobdell joined the 10th Tactical Reconnaissance Wing at Spangdahlem, Germany, in July 1959 and served as executive officer. He moved with the wing to Royal Air Force Station Chelveston and then to Royal Air Force Station Alconbury, England, where he became chief, Plans Division. In February 1961 he assumed command of the 1st Tactical Reconnaissance Squadron, also at Alconbury, and in February.1962 returned to the 10th Wing as chief, Tactical Operations Division. He later went to Toul-Rosieres Air Base, France, to be assistant deputy commander for operations for the wing.

In August 1963 Lobdell entered the Air War College, Maxwell Air Force Base, Alabama After graduation in August 1964, he returned to Headquarters U.S. Air Force and was assigned as a plans and programs officer in the Directorate of Doctrine, Concepts and Objectives. During this tour of duty, he was concerned with various aspects of advanced planning including future aerospace capabilities, limited war doctrine, concepts and objectives.

Lobdell went to Southeast Asia in June 1967 as commander of Detachment 1, 432d TRW at Takhli Royal Thai Air Force Base, Thailand, and in August was assigned as deputy commander for operations/reconnaissance, 355th Tactical Fighter Wing at Takhli. During these assignments he flew 105 missions—66 over North Vietnam—in the EB-66 Destroyer aircraft.

In August 1968 he returned to the United States and was assigned to Air Training Command at Randolph Air Force Base, Texas, as director of operations for the 3510th Flying Training Wing. In June 1969 he assumed command of the 3560th Pilot Training Wing, ATC, at Webb Air Force Base, Texas, and in April 1970 he returned to Randolph Air Force Base to command the 3510th Flying Training Wing. In January 1971 he became inspector general for Headquarters Air Training Command at Randolph Air Force Base.

Lobdell was appointed director, European Division, Office of the Assistant Secretary of Defense (International Security Affairs), Washington, D.C., in February 1971. He assumed duty as deputy chief of staff for plans, U.S. Air Forces in Europe, with headquarters at Ramstein Air Base, Germany, in August 1974.

Lobdell became commandant of the National War College on September 1, 1976.

He is a command pilot. His military decorations and awards include the Distinguished Service Medal with oak leaf cluster, Legion of Merit with oak leaf cluster, Distinguished Flying Cross with oak leaf cluster, Air Medal with 12 oak leaf clusters, Air Force Commendation Medal, Distinguished Unit Citation Emblem, Air Force Outstanding Unit Award Ribbon, and the Republic of Korea Presidential Unit Citation Ribbon.

He was promoted to the grade of major general February 12, 1975, with date of rank July 1, 1972. He retired September 1, 1978. In his later years, he lived San Antonio, Texas, where he died in 2014.
