= Enric Cluselles =

Spanish artist

Enric Cluselles i Albertí, also known as Nyerra, (23 August 1914 in Barcelona – 17 July 2014) was a Spanish artist of Catalan descent who created drawings, bookplates, engravings and interior design elements.

== Biography ==
Born in Barcelona in 1914, Cluselles studied at Escola de la Llotja and Escola Massana in Barcelona between 1929 and 1934. In 1934, he made his first bookplate and published his first drawings in the Quaderns literaris collection edited by Josep Janés. In 1936 he took part to the Professional Designers Union with Pere Calders, Tísner and Carles Fontserè. Cluselles contributed to the L'Esquetlla de la Torratxa weekly magazine, signing his work as Nyerra. his drawings featured characters with mustaches and seal feet, also known as man-seals.

In 1937, during the Spanish Civil War Cluselles joined the Republican front, serving as a carabinieri with Pere Calders. In 1938 he edited Unitats de xoc written by Calders and illustrated with his woodcuts.

After the Republican defeat in 1939, Cluselles fled Spain. He travelled through France, finally staying Roissy-en-Brie, the home of other exiled Catalan intellectuals. In October 1939, in Paris, Cluselles married Amalia Casals.

In July 1940 Cluselles returned to Barcelona, but was arrested and imprisoned in the Sant Ferran Castle. After his release from prison later that year, he went back again to Barcelona. During this period he taught at Escola Massana and worked as a commercial designer for a company cal;led Juper. He also worked as the graphic designer for “Al monigote de papel” collection from “Janés” editor.

Cluselles also started a collaboration with Santiago Marco, interior designer and president of the FAD (Foment de les Arts Decoratives), Cluselles later founded his own company Tírvia. He also restored and decorated old farmhouses, mansions and chalets, cinemas in Barcelona (Paris, Alondra, Fantasio, Publi ...) Jewelry “Capdevila”, publishing house “Éxito” or bookstores like Occidente and Catalònia.

Clucelles also cultivated other artistic fields, the most prominent being the woodcut, which he employed in the majority of his bookplates (more than 100). Also noteworthy are his New Year greetings -PF-, in which Cluselles satirizes about the present. As an amateur he was also dedicated to sculpture, painting and jewelry.

Cluselles' personal collection is preserved in Biblioteca de Catalunya, which includes the 3500 plans of houses and interior designs.

== Bibliography ==
- Diví, Oriol M. "Nyerra": Enric Clusellas i Albertí in “Ex-libris portaveu de l'Associació Catalana d'Exlibristes” (Núm. 14, gener-juny 1996, p. 19-21).
- Enric Clusellas : 23 d’agost 2004. [Barcelona : Germanes Clusellas, 2004. 156 p.
- Enric Cluselle/as. “Ex-libris portaveu de l'Associació Catalana d'Exlibristes” (Núm. 41, 2009).
