= Abdel Hamid Shaheen =

Egyptian footballer (1943-2014)

Abdel Hamid Shaheen (Arabic: عبد الحميد شاهين born 1943, Cairo - 2 July 2014, Cairo) was an Egyptian football goalkeeper.

== Biography ==
He debuted as a player in 1960 with Zamalek SC when he was 21 years old. He played for the club for ten seasons until 1970, when then club won the Egypt Cup in 1962, and the Egyptian Premier League in 1964 and 1965.
