= Ridwan Laher Nytagodien =

South African university professor in political science

Ridwan Laher (5 June 1964 – 2 July 2014), also known as Ridwan Laher Nytagodien, was a South African university professor in political science, an independent political consultant, and a research associate of the McGregor Museum in Kimberley, South Africa.

== Early life and education ==
Laher was born in Johannesburg and grew up in Kimberley, his parents having moved there from Johannesburg in the early 1970s. Under the influence of Pan Africanist Congress (PAC) leader Robert Mangaliso Sobukwe, a close family friend, Laher pursued a university education in social and political science in the United States, graduating with an Associate of Arts at Catonsville Community College, Baltimore, in 1984; a Bachelor of Science from Towson State University, Baltimore, in 1986; and a Master Science from Indiana State University in 1990. In 1997 he was awarded a PhD in political science by Howard University in Washington D.C. for his doctoral thesis "South Africa's role in Southern Africa: a post-apartheid foreign policy."

== Career ==
Laher taught Black Studies, African Studies, and Political Science at universities in the United States (Portland), South Africa (Stellenbosch), and India (Jawaharlal Nehru University). He published papers in international peer-reviewed journals and made research presentations at conferences in Canada, Malaysia, Mexico, and Kenya. In 2006 he was appointed as the Nelson Mandela Chair and Professor for African Studies at Jawaharlal Nehru University in India.

Laher returned to Kimberley in South Africa in 2010 to be with his mother after his father had died, there acting as an independent consultant and research associate of the McGregor Museum. He headed a team of museum historians producing new displays and publications on the history of the liberation struggle in the Northern Cape, 1850 to the present.

He and Abraham Korir Sing'Oei edited a volume, Indigenous People in Africa: Contestations, Empowerment and Group Rights, published in 2014 by the Africa Institute of South Africa, where Laher had been a chief research specialist.

At the time of his death, he had been employed as an independent political consultant to the Premier's Office, reviewing twenty years of departmental performance in the Northern Cape.

== Blogging ==
Laher launched a blog, 'Fatima and Ahmed's son Ridwan Laher', during his time at Jawaharlal Nehru University, as a medium to communicate his opinions on politics, origins, identity and humanitarian issues.

== Death ==
Laher died in Kimberley on 2 July 2014, at the age of 50.
