= Madeleine Gekiere =

Swiss-American artist

- Born: Marie Madeleine Wormser; May 15, 1919; Zurich, Switzerland
- Died: July 1, 2014 (aged 95); Chelsea, New York, U.S.
- Education: Art Students League of New York; Brooklyn Museum Art School; New York University
- Occupations: Artist, illustrator, filmmaker, author
- Known for: Book illustration, Abstract Expressionism, Experimental film
- Notable work: Illustrations for Switch on the Night by Ray Bradbury

Madeleine Gekiere (May 15, 1919 - July 2, 2014), was an American multi-disciplinary artist, illustrator, filmmaker and author. She is known for her drawings and mixed media paintings, as well as her short films, short stories and illustrated books. She illustrated Ray Bradbury’s 1995 novel Switch on the Night. Four books illustrated by Gekiere were chosen New York Times Best Illustrated Children’s Books of the Year from 1952 to 2002.

== Life and education ==
Madeleine Gekiere was born in Zurich in 1919 and graduated from school in 1938. Fearing that Switzerland might be invaded by Nazis, her Jewish family came to America when Madeleine was 20 years old. She studied at New York University, the Art Students League, and Brooklyn Museum School. Gekiere taught painting at City College in New York for more than 23 years. Madeleine was married to an actor Paul Potter.

She committed suicide in her Chelsea apartment at the age of 96.

== Art ==
Having completed her studies at New York University, the Art Students League, and Brooklyn Museum School, Gekiere found her way as an artist, painter and sculptor. Her early drawing and paintings explore modernist abstraction and feature an earthy palette of blacks, browns and tans, while her later works experiment with assemblage, using everyday objects implying connections to figurative forms, like light bulbs, wood handles, toys, hosiery and books. Gekiere began showing her work at the Badcock Gallery in the New York in 1950s.

At the same time she got acquainted with famed children’s book author and illustrator Helen Sewell living in same house who got Madeleine into book illustration. In the next ten years Gekiere illustrated two books that she wrote (Who Gave Us… Peacocks? Planes? & Ferris Wheels?, 1953 and The Frilly Lily and the Princess, 1960 and many books by other authors. She illustrated several books for the poet John Ciardi and Ray Bradbury’s 1955 novel Switch on the Night.

During 1970s and 1980s Gekiere made experimental short films, and recently, the Anthology Film Archives screened her collection including the 1980 film Chewing. Three of her films are available for rent at The Film-Maker’s Coop.

== Exhibitions and collections ==
Madeleine Gekiere exhibited with Fred Torres Collaborations. At her solo exhibition A Life Time of Sketchbooks (2012) twenty sketchbooks compiled by the artist were presented.

Gekiere’s art is in permanent collections of the Museum of New Zealand Te Papa Tongarewa, Baltimore Museum of Art, the Brooklyn Museum, the Dallas Museum of Art, and the New York Public Library.

== Works ==
=== Books illustrated (selection) ===
- Mrs. McThing, a play, Mary Chase, 1952
- Gwendolyn, Ruth H Helm, 1952
- Mr. Putterbee’s jungle, Ruth H Helm, 1953
- Who gave us … peacocks? planes? & ferris wheels? Madeleine Gekiere, 1953
- Grimm’s tales, Jacob Grimm, 1954
- Peterli and the mountain, Georgia Engelhard, 1954
- Switch on the night, Ray Bradbury, 1955
- The fisherman and his wife, Jacob Grimm, 1957
- The reason for the pelican, John Ciardi, 1959
- The frilly lily and the princess, Madeleine Gekiere, 1960
- John J. Plenty and Fiddler Dan: a new fable of the grasshopper and the ant, John Ciardi, 1963

=== Filmography (selection) ===
- Three accelerations, 1970-1979
- Horizontal transfer, 1975
- The Breakable spaces between, 1980
- Arabesque for Marie Menken, 1982
- The Garden of Hieronymus, 1982
- They are not Chrysanthemums: Only Man Can Make a Rivet, 1984
