= Gerald Cresswell =

South African cricketer (1928–2014)

Personal information
- Born: 4 September 1928; Johannesburg, South Africa
- Died: 15 July 2014 (aged 85); Nelspruit, South Africa
- Source: Cricinfo, 18 April 2016

Gerald Cresswell (4 September 1928 – 15 July 2014) was a South African cricketer. He played four first-class matches for Northerns between 1949 and 1953.
