= Paul F. X. Moriarty =

American politician

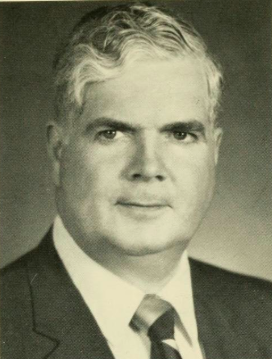
Paul F X Moriarty

Paul F. X. Moriarty (August 18, 1929 – July 3, 2014) was an American jurist and politician.

Moriarty was an attorney and served legal counsel and director for the Rockland Federal Credit Union. He also served on the board of trustees of Brockton Hospital.

Moriarty was the Town Moderator and Veterans Agent of Abington, Massachusetts. He contested the 1975 election as a Democratic Party candidate for the 4th Plymouth district seat on the Massachusetts House of Representatives. He retained the seat in the 1976 election cycle. In 1978, he was a candidate for the 7th Plymouth district seat, and lost to Andrew Card. From 1981 to 1982 he was the Clerk Magistrate of Hingham District Court. From 1982 to 1999 he served as a judge in the Hingham and Brockton District Courts.
