= Fred Daspit =

American artist and academic

- Born: c. 1931; St. Martinville, Louisiana, U.S.
- Died: July 8, 2014; Lafayette, Louisiana, U.S.
- Education: University of Louisiana at Lafayette; Louisiana State University

Fred Daspit (c. 1931 – July 8, 2014) was an American artist and academic. He taught art and architecture at the University of Louisiana at Lafayette, and he authored three books about the antebellum architecture of Louisiana.

== Works ==
- Daspit, Fred (2004). Louisiana Architecture, 1714-1820. Lafayette, Louisiana: University of Louisiana at Lafayette. ISBN 9781887366601. OCLC 59225810.
- Daspit, Fred (2005). Louisiana Architecture, 1820-1840. Lafayette, Louisiana: University of Louisiana at Lafayette. ISBN 9781887366588. OCLC 728068654.
- Daspit, Fred (2006). Louisiana Architecture, 1840-1860. Lafayette, Louisiana: University of Louisiana at Lafayette. ISBN 9781887366748. OCLC 124039726.
