= Mohamed Mohamud Hayd =

Somali politician (died 2014)

Mohamed Mohamud Hayd (Somali: Maxamed Maxamuud Xayd, Arabic: محمد محمود حيد) (died July 3, 2014) was a Somali politician and military officer. He was an MP in the Federal Parliament of Somalia.

== Career ==
Hayd was previously a senior commander and admiral in the Somali National Army and Somali Navy. He later served tenures as Minister of Education and Minister of the Environment of Somalia. Following the establishment of the Federal Parliament in 2012, he was appointed as a legislator.

On 3 July 2014, Hayd and his bodyguard were shot dead while driving near Mogadishu's Central Hotel. Federal MP Abdullahi Ahmed Hussein "Onka", who was riding in the same car, survived the attack and was being treated at a local hospital. According to Hamarweyne Commissioner Mohamed Abdikadir, the attackers had sprayed the vehicle the MPs were in with bullets, and immediately escaped from the scene. Lawmaker Dahir Amin Jesow indicated that another legislator and a parliamentary secretary were also wounded during the exchange of gunfire. He described Hayd as an industrious colleague during his ten or so years serving in parliament. Al-Shabaab later claimed responsibility for the attack. Additionally, Prime Minister Abdiweli Sheikh Ahmed sent his condolences to Hayd's family.
