= Woodbury Ski Area =

Ski area in Connecticut, United States

Coordinates: 41.58983°N 73.25578°W

- Interactive map of Woodbury Ski Area
- Location: 785 Washington Avenue Woodbury, Connecticut 06798, United States
- Vertical: 300 ft (91 m)
- Trails: 15
- Lift system: 1 chair: 1 Double, 5 Surface Lifts
- Snowmaking: 100%
- Website: Woodbury Ski Area

Woodbury Ski Area was a ski area located in Woodbury, Connecticut. This small ski area was in northwestern Connecticut, about 2 hours from New York City. The skiing and snow tubing operations were serviced by a chairlift and multiple surface lifts. Local residents referred to it as "Rod's" after its owner, Olympic skier Rod Taylor.

Taylor opened the resort in 1972. Taylor took pride in Woodbury being the first ski area in Connecticut to open each season.

The ski area closed in 2016 following a drought and has not reopened. It has since been bought, however, its future is uncertain. The ski area may reopen in the coming years, as work has begun to get the park operational again.
