= Ivan Kuvačić =

Croatian sociologist

- Born: January 12, 1923
- Died: 20 June 2014 (aged 90)
- Occupation: Croatia
- Notable work: professor emeritus at Zagreb University

Ivan Kuvačić (January 12, 1923 – July 20, 2014) was a Croatian Marxist sociologist and a professor emeritus at Zagreb University. He was a member of the advisory board of Praxis.
