= Alistair Hanna =

Northern Irish businessman

Alistair Matthew Hanna (18 January 1945 – 12 July 2014) was a Northern Irish businessman who managed the controversial Bushmills Dunes golf resort project.

Hanna was born in Holywood, Northern Ireland. He did his undergraduate work at Queen's University Belfast in physics and received his doctorate in 1972 in nuclear physics at the Atomic Energy Research Establishment near Harwell, as well as an MBA from Harvard Business School in 1974.

After joining the global consulting firm, McKinsey & Co., he rose to the position of managing partner, of the Stamford, Connecticut, office and led the firm's microelectronics and software practices operations. After retiring as a managing partner in 1997, he was Chairman of the Board until 2004. From 2004 onwards he chaired Alpha North America, a Christian group that provided coursework and an educational environment for a variety of Christian denominations.

He died of cancer in June 2014, survived by his wife, Nancy, and his step-daughter.
