= V. Sreekumar =

Indian cricketer (1966–2014)

Personal information
- Full name: V G Sreekumar
- Born: 31 May 1966; Thrippunithura, India
- Died: 24 July 2014 (aged 48); Kuwait
- Source: Cricinfo, 13 April 2016

V. Sreekumar (31 May 1966 – 24 July 2014) was an Indian cricketer. He played two first-class matches for Kerala in 1989/90.
