= Ian Moutray =

- Born: Ian Edmund Joseph Moutray; 2 July 1936 Ryde, New South Wales
- Died: 17 July 2014 (aged 78) Sydney, Australia

Rugby union career
- Position: centre
International career
Years	Team	Apps	(Points)
1963	Wallabies	1	(0)

Ian Edmund Joseph Moutray (2 July 1936 – 17 July 2014) was a rugby union player who represented Australia.

Moutray, an inside centre, was born in Ryde, New South Wales and claimed 3 international rugby caps for Australia. He was educated at Fort Street Boys High School and graduated from Sydney University. He played club rugby for Drummoyne in an era when it was a leading club.
