= Morris Martin =

American football coach

Biographical details
- Born: March 3, 1929; Sykeston, North Dakota, U.S.
- Died: July 3, 2014 (aged 85); Dickinson, North Dakota, U.S.

Coaching career (HC unless noted)
- 1965–1967: Dickinson State (assistant)
- 1968–1970: Dickinson State

Head coaching record
- Overall: 10–12–2

Morris Edwin Martin (March 3, 1929 – July 3, 2014) was an American football coach. Martin was the 11th head football coach at Dickinson State College—now known as Dickinson State University–in Dickinson, North Dakota and held that position for three seasons, from 1968 until 1970. His coaching record at Dickinson State was 10–12–2.

== Head coaching record ==
Year	Team	Overall	Conference	Standing	Bowl/playoffs
Dickinson State Savages (North Dakota College Athletic Conference) (1968–1970)
1968	Dickinson State	3–4–1	2–3–1	5th	
1969	Dickinson State	5–2–1	3–1–1	T–2nd	
1970	Dickinson State	2–6	2–3	T–3rd	
Dickinson State:		10–12–2	7–7–2		
Total:		10–12–2			
