= Dámaso Ruano =

Spanish geometric landscape artist, painter and academic

Dámaso Ruano (1938 – July 1, 2014) was a Spanish geometric landscape artist, painter and academic. Ruano was awarded with the Medal of the City of Málaga in June 2014 for his work and career. He had resided in Málaga since 1969. Ruano died in Málaga on July 1, 2014, at the age of 76, less than one month after receiving his award.
