= C. C. Bridgewater =

American judge

Carroll C. Bridgewater, Jr. (July 8, 1944 – July 20, 2014) was a judge of Division II of the Washington Court of Appeals, having been out on the court in November 1994 and holding the post until leaving in 2010 due to a heart attack.

Bridgewater received a Bachelor of Arts in philosophy from Stanford University in 1966 and was given a law degree from the University of Texas School of Law in 1969.

After leaving the University of Texas Law School, Bridgewater joined the Federal Trade Commission to do work in consumer protection in Kansas City, Missouri. Three years later, he became a deputy prosecuting attorney in Cowlitz County, Washington. He left government employment two years later to enter private practice to be a domestic relations, health care, and criminal defense attorney. In 1986, he was given the post of Prosecuting Attorney of Cowlitz County, which he held until being named to the Washington Court of Appeals in 1994. He was retained by the electorate in 1995, 1998, and 2004.

On June 4, 2010, Bridgewater suffered a heart attack in Nuremberg, Germany while on vacation in Europe and was in a medically induced coma for five weeks. Consequently, he missed the June 11 deadline to file for re-election to the Court.

During his 16 years on the court, he wrote 1,500 opinions and edited 3,000 opinions.

He was replaced on the court by Jill Johanson, who had worked for him in the Cowlitz County Prosecutor's office.

Bridgewater lived in Castle Rock, Washington, with his wife, Kay, with whom he had three sons. He died on July 20, 2014.

Legal offices
Preceded by Gerry L. Alexander	Judge of the Washington Court of Appeals, Division II; November 1994 – January 10, 2011	Succeeded by Jill Johanson
