= Khenpo Kyosang Rinpoche =

Spiritual leader of Tibetan Buddhism

Khenpo Kyosang Rinpoche (Wylie: mkhan po skyo sangs rin po che) was a spiritual teacher (lama) of Tibetan Buddhism. Born in Tibet 9 years before the Chinese invasion of 1959 (see reunification of China), he was ordained as a monk at an early age. In the same year he flew with other monks to South India and grew up in a monastery in exile, where he worked as an assistant teacher. At the age of 33 he has received his geshe hlarampa degree (doctorate in Buddhist philosophy) and the title of khenpo (abbot). In 1988 Rinpoche went to London to spread Buddhism in Europe. Having experienced many difficulties, he finally founded in 2001 Je Tsongkhapa Ling Buddhist College and Home Retirement (Tib. rje tsong kha pa'i rig pa'i 'byung gnas gling) in Alsace, France and remained its director until his death. In September 2012 he went to his silent retreat. In 2013 Rinpoche published a book of his sermons under the title Snow Lion Faces Europe. This book provides sharp criticism towards the Western society, Western democracy, and consumption as modern Paganism. Rinpoche died in Saarbrücken, Germany, on 31 July 2014.
