= Mohamed Shangole =

Somali footballer and sports official

Mohamed Qalaf Aden "Shangole" (c. 1931 – 7 July 2014) was a Somali footballer and sports official. He served as the first captain of the Somalia national football team. Aden subsequently served as a senior advisor with the Somali Football Federation. He was also the head of the Middle Shabelle Olympics committee. On 7 July 2014, Aden died after lapsing into a coma while undergoing treatment at a hospital. He spent most of his life in Jowhar.
