= Pearl Kong Chen =

Chinese cookbook author

- Born: 江獻珠; June 17, 1926; Guangzhou, China
- Died: July 21, 2014 (aged 88); Hong Kong
- Other name: Pearl Kong
- Occupations: cooking teacher and cookbook author
- Known for: Cantonese cuisine
- Notable work: Everything You Want to Know About Chinese Cooking

Pearl Kong Chen (June 17, 1926 – July 21, 2014) was a Chinese American cooking teacher and cookbook author known as an expert on Cantonese cuisine.

Chen's grandfather, Kong Hungyun, was a Qing dynasty official and noted gourmet in Guangzhou in the early 1900s, but she did not begin her own culinary career until she came to America in 1967. She lived in New York and in California, where she taught cooking and home economics classes at San Jose State University and provided instruction to high school teachers.

Chen wrote over 40 cookbooks, primarily in Chinese, but in 1983 she published Everything You Want to Know about Chinese Cooking, for an American audience. Her co-authors were her husband, Tien Chi Chen (陳天機) (1928–), and dietitian and food science professor Rose Y. L. Tseng. The cookbook includes 243 recipes, including steamed whole fish, braised abalone with black mushrooms in oyster sauce, spicy soy sauce chicken, red-cooked chicken with chestnuts, braised orange duck, fish-flavoured pork shreds, braised radish balls with dried shrimp, home-made noodles, and classic Chinese flaky pastry.

Chen died on July 21, 2014, in Hong Kong.
