= Alois Spichtig =

Swiss graphic artist and sculptor

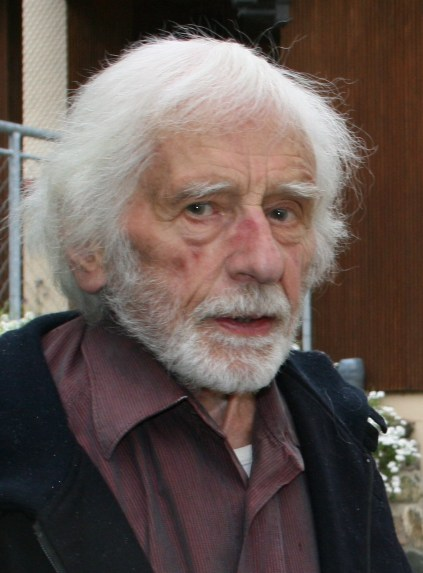
Alois Spichtig

Alois Spichtig (25 March 1927, in Sachseln – 24 July 2014, in Sachseln) was a Swiss graphic artist and sculptor.

== Biography ==
=== Early life and education ===
Spichtig was born in the hamlet Edisried and raised in Sachseln. In the father and grandfather's workshop, he learned how to use timber and completed an apprenticeship as a white cooper. He was a guest instructor at the Lucerne University of Applied Sciences and Arts and continued his education with a three-month stay in Paris. He began creating grave signs, first wooden and then stone in collaboration with a fellow sculptor.

=== Work ===
Spichtig worked on over 40 churches and chapels throughout Switzerland, artistically designing rooms, including 15 liturgical rooms in his home of Obwalden. Spichtig's work was strongly anchored to his home and was inspired by the Patron Saint Nicholas of Flüe. He was one of the initiators of the Museum Bruder Klaus Sachseln and designed the permanent exhibition shown from 1976 to 2011. From 1976 to 1992, he headed the museum. The highlight of this period was the exhibition "Nicholas of Flue" and included bringing 30 major Swiss artist to Obwalden.

=== Awards ===
- 1996 Recognition Award of the Heinrich Federer Foundation
- 2010 Obwaldner Culture Award
