= Rod Taylor (skier) =

American alpine skier (1943–2014)

Roderick G. Taylor (July 7, 1943 – July 5, 2014) was a member of the U.S. Olympic Ski Team from 1967 to 1971. He gained the title of National Downhill Champion in 1970 after winning the Roche Cup in Aspen, Colorado. He competed in the World Pro Ski Racing circuit and the U.S. Masters Ski Racing circuit, medaling in slalom and downhill skiing.

Taylor was born in Hartford, Connecticut and received a degree in economics from Western State College. In 1972 he opened the Woodbury Ski Area in Connecticut, which he operated until his death.
