= Ronald Charles Newman =

British physicist

Ronald Charles (Ron) Newman FRS (10 December 1931 — 30 July 2014) was a British physicist who specialised in the field of semiconductors.

He received his undergraduate degree in physics from Imperial College in 1952, followed by postgraduate work and a PhD in 1955.

From there, Ron moved to the Central Research Laboratories of AEI (Associated Electrical Industries) in Berkshire from 1955 to 1963, where he worked on single-crystal silicon. He then joined the physics department at the University of Reading in a lectureship role in 1964, where he remained until 1988, where after he returned to Imperial. At Imperial, in 1989, he became associate director of the newly established Semiconductor Materials Interdisciplinary Research Centre. He became emeritus professor and senior research investigator at Imperial College London, as well as visiting professor at Reading University and the University of Manchester Institute of Science and Technology (now the University of Manchester).

He was elected Fellow of the Institute of Physics in 1971 and Fellow of the Royal Society in 1998.
