= Pulin Das =

Indian cricketer (1918–2014)

Personal information
- Full name: Pulin C Das
- Born: 1 November 1918; Guwahati, India
- Died: 16 July 2014 (aged 95); Guwahati, India
- Batting: Right-handed
- Role: Batsman

Domestic team information
- Years: Team
- 1949/50–1951/52: Assam cricket team

Career statistics
Competition	First-class
Matches	2
Runs scored	26
Batting average	26.00
100s/50s	0/0
Top score	16
Catches/stumpings	0/–
- Source: Cricinfo, 13 April 2016

Pulin Das (1 November 1918 – 16 July 2014) was an Indian first-class cricketer. He played two matches for Assam between 1949 and 1952. He was a right-handed batsman. He was a pioneer organizer of sport events and a veteran sport journalist in India. He was also the founding secretary of Assam Cricket Association. He was the last living member of Assam's first Ranji Cricket Team in 1948.

== Career ==
He was a regular tennis player until his death with fellow members of the India Club and commonly known as a strong man because of his physical well-being. Apart from being a cricketer, he was a table tennis, hockey and tennis player. He was part of founding new sport organizations. Das was closely associated regarding construction of the Nehru Stadium in India.

In 1949, Das joined the first class Assam cricket team. He was later resigned from team in 1952 and continued his works in the Assam Cricket Association.

== Awards ==
- ACA Lifetime Achievement Award: 2013
