= International Conference on Technology in Collegiate Mathematics =

The International Conference on Technology in Collegiate Mathematics (ICTCM) is an annual conference sponsored by Pearson Addison-Wesley & Pearson Prentice Hall publishers. Electronic proceedings have been available for many years and are included in the List of free electronic journals in mathematics.

Since ICTCM 10, the conference has awarded an annual ICTCM Award to recognize an individual or group for excellence and innovation in using technology to enhance the teaching and learning of mathematics.
