= Solomon Humes =

Bahamian lay bishop

The Most Reverend Solomon Humes
- Vicar Apostolic of the Bahama Islands
- See: Bahama Islands

Personal details
- Born: February 26, 1951
- Died: July 7, 2014 (aged 63)
- Denomination: Catholic Church

Solomon Lincoln Humes (26 February 1951 - 7 July 2014) was a Bahamian lay bishop in the Church of God of Prophecy. He was educated at St Augustine's College, Nassau, and formerly worked for Coutts.

== Directorships ==
He was named in the 2016 Panama Papers leak. He was Vice-President of Blairmore Holdings, an offshore fund run by David Cameron's late father Ian Cameron.

He was also President of S.L.H. & Group Inc, and a Director of Atlantico Worldwide SA, Capricord Games Inc, Challenge Promotion Inc, Connepaw Inc, Euro Sport Promotion Inc, Fairmont Overseas Inc, Fast Line Inc, Floors Investments SA, Hollyburn Pictures (Panama) Inc, International Electronic Consultants Limited Inc, Invincible Investments Inc, Kwai SA, Mouchet Associates Inc, O E A International Inc, Oman International Consultants Inc, Pineoak Properties Limited, Race Promo Consultant Inc, RHU SA, Savee (Property) Inc, Standfast Inc, W. A. Casinos Inc, Walfcane SA, Waren SA, and Wheel Spin Inc.

== Family ==
His twin brother Bishop John Nathaniel Humes was a former President of the Christian Council and Overseer of the Church of God. His son, Solomon Lincoln Humes Jr., was sentenced to 5 years in prison for possessing drugs with the intent to distribute by Bland County Circuit Court in 2014, and was also given a six-month driver's license suspension.
