= Guy Gaucher =

Guy Étienne Germain Gaucher OCD
- Bishop of Meaux
- Church: Catholic Church
- Diocese: Diocese of Meaux
- In office: 27 August 1986 – 7 May 1987
- Predecessor: Louis Kuehn
- Successor: Louis Cornet
- Other posts: Titular Bishop of Rota (1987-2014); Auxiliary Bishop of Bayeux and Lisieux (1987-2005)

Orders
- Ordination: 17 March 1963
- Consecration: 19 October 1986 by Jean-Marie Lustiger

Personal details
- Born: 5 March 1930 Tournan-en-Brie, Seine-et-Marne, France
- Died: 3 July 2014 (aged 84)

Guy Étienne Germain Gaucher, OCD (5 March 1930 – 3 July 2014) was a French Discalced Carmelite bishop and theologian. He served as Bishop of Meaux and was an international authority on the life and writings of Thérèse of Lisieux.

== Biography ==
Born in Tournan-en-Brie, he was ordained a priest on 17 March 1963 and made his religious profession into the order of Discalced Carmelites on 3 October 1968. He was named Bishop of Meaux, 27 August 1986, consecrated on 19 October 1986 by the archbishop of Paris, cardinal Jean-Marie Lustiger. A few months later, 7 May 1987, he was named auxiliary bishop of Bayeux-Lisieux in residence at Lisieux. He remained in this post until 1 July 2005 at which time he retired, having reached the retirement age for bishops (75).

At first a specialist in the writings of Georges Bernanos, he subsequently devoted his attention to the personality and writings of Thérèse of Lisieux. Amongst his many editorial works, he notably participated in the centenary Edition of the works of Thérèse.

Gaucher died on 3 July 2014 at the age of 84.

== Publications ==
- Gaucher, Guy. The Story of a Life: St. Thérèse of Lisieux. San Francisco: Harper & Row, 1987. ISBN 978-0-06-063095-9 Over copies in US libraries, according to WorldCat
  - Review, Catholic Historical Review, Apr., 1989, vol. 75, no. 2, p. 304-305
- Gaucher, Guy. John and Thérèse: Flames of Love : the Influence of St. John of the Cross in the Life and Writings of St. Thérèse of Lisieux. Staten Island, N.Y.: Alba House, 1999.
- Thérèse, Guy Gaucher, and Aletheia Kane. The Prayers of Saint Thérèse of Lisieux: The Act of Oblation. Washington, DC: ICS Publications, 1997.
- Gaucher, Guy. The Passion of Thérèse of Lisieux: 4 April - 30 September 1897. New York: Crossroad, 1990.
- Gaucher, Guy. I Would Like To Travel the World: Thérèse of Lisieux: Miracle-Worker, Doctor, and Missionary. Sophia Institute Press, 2023.
