= Robert L. Goodale =

American surgeon and philanthropist (1930–2014)

- Born: 1930; Boston, Massachusetts, US
- Died: July 17, 2014 (aged 83–84); Edina, Minnesota, US
- Education: Groton School; Princeton University; Columbia College of Physicians and Surgeons (M.D., 1956); University of Minnesota (Ph.D., 1966)
- Awards: Harold S. Diehl Award
- Scientific career
- Workplaces: University of Minnesota

Robert L. Goodale (1930 – July 17, 2014) was a surgeon and philanthropist at the University of Minnesota who was instrumental in developing noninvasive procedures that allow patients to return home the same day.

== Early life and education ==
Goodale was born in Boston, Massachusetts, but grew up in Cambridge and Ipswich. A graduate of Groton School, he obtained his undergraduate degree from Princeton University. He then worked for his MD degree at the Columbia University College of Physicians and Surgeons which he got by 1956. Goodale spent the next three years as an intern at Boston City Hospital before joining the United States Army, and after the service got enrolled into the University of Minnesota from which he got his double Ph.D. in surgery and physiology in 1966.

== Career ==
Following his dissertation, Goodale remained at the University of Minnesota (U of M) becoming an instructor at its Department of Surgery where he worked under the leadership of Owen Harding Wangensteen. During his early academic career at U of M, he became interested in endoscopy, and ended up spending two months in Kyoto University, developing new endoscopic techniques with Yu Kawai. His focus and persistence lead to the development of lasers, an advanced sclerotherapy and electrocautery and clipping which are currently used to cure gastrointestinal bleeding. His other achievement was the stenting of esophagus and biliary tract to ease airway obstruction.

== Philanthropy ==
A year after retiring, Goodale and his wife, Katherine, became philanthropists and donated $1 million to endow a chair for minimally invasive procedure at the University of Minnesota Medical School. They also gave $3.4 million to Cowles Center for Dance and the Performing Arts to rebuild Shubert Theater, which now bears the names of Bob and Katherine Goodale. As a servant on the board of Ballet Arts Minnesota he traveled with his wife to Russia where they performed with Link Vostok, a Russia-based dance cultural-exchange program.

== Personal life and death ==
Goodale was married to Katherine and has four children; Anne Esmonde, Katherine Prendergast, Margaret Mason, and Robert L. Goodale III. When he was not doing endoscopy and philanthropy, Goodale was busy with playing trombone and enjoyed recording music. He also was an avid sailor. Goodale died of cancer at the age of 84, while residing in Edina, Minnesota.

== Awards and fellowships ==
Dr. Goodale was a fellow of the American Surgical Association and a recipient of Harold S. Diehl Award.
