= Joas Magolego =

South African soccer player

Personal information
- Date of birth: 13 October 1971
- Place of birth: South Africa
- Date of death: 4 July 2014 (aged 42)
- Position: Defender

Senior career*
Years	Team	Apps	(Gls)
1990–2002	Mamelodi Sundowns	352	(14)

International career
1993	South Africa	2	(0)
- * Club domestic league appearances and goals

Joas Magolego (13 October 1971 – 4 July 2014), popularly known as Hluphi, was a South African football defender who played for Mamelodi Sundowns from 1990 until 2002, and won two caps with the national team in 1993.
