= George Baillie (ice hockey) =

British ice hockey player

Personal information
- Born: 19 May 1919; Hill of Beath, Scotland
- Died: 21 July 2014 (aged 95); St. Catharines, Ontario, Canada

Sport
- Sport: Ice hockey

George Wilson Baillie (19 May 1919 – 21 July 2014) was a British-Canadian ice hockey player. He competed in the men's tournament at the 1948 Winter Olympics.
