= Alan Shefsky =

American writer

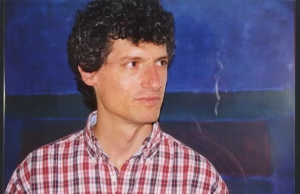
- Born: Alan Neal Shefsky; June 22, 1959; Chicago, Illinois, U.S.
- Died: July 1, 2014 (aged 55); Evanston, Illinois, U.S.
- Education: Northwestern University
- Occupation: Poet
- Writing career
- Genre: Lyric Poetry
- Notable awards: 1999 Illinois Arts Council Literary Award, 2004 Northwestern Graduate School Ver Steeg Award.

Alan Shefsky (June 22, 1959 – July 1, 2014) was, in his own words, "a poet and occasionally an essayist." He was a graduate of Northwestern University and worked there in the Department of Performance Studies for 25 years until 2011 when he was diagnosed with an inoperable glioblastoma. This diagnosis had a notable impact on his writing style, which he summed up succinctly as "my writings after are different from my writings before." He died three years later in 2014.

== Life ==
Shefsky was a resident of Cook County, Illinois and lived in both Chicago and Evanston, where he first studied then worked at Northwestern University. He was featured in TriQuarterly first in 1998 and again in 1999, and the same year he won the Illinois Arts Council Literary Award alongside USD $1,000. His work Glee and Other Poems was performed by the Northwestern school of performing arts in 2014 in the Wallis Theater. He was posthumously published in the Journal of Poetry Therapy in 2017. One of his poems was made into a song by the band Hen in the Foxhouse He is also featured in the acknowledgements of dozens of publications due to his long tenure at Northwestern University. An associate academic Paul Edwards dedicated a video essay in honor of Shefsky, published in 2017. He maintained a correspondence through letters with a friend and fellow poet Abe Young for over a decade. After his death the mass amount of letters were turned into an exhibition held in Evanston, Illinois, as well as in Austin, Texas.

Da Cityachicawgo

A-train, B-train, subway riders, Evingston extra fare,
highway, skyway, rush hour traffic, Kennedy to O'hare.
State Street Great Street, Michigan Avenue, Rush Street after dark,
Pilsen, Pullman, Uptown, Downtown, Humbolt/Rogers Park.
English spoken, mowimy po polsku, se habla espanol
Ain'it, an' she goes, I seen 'im, I axed her, jus' like I was tol'.
Rep the nation, fly the colors, pitchfork eagle crown,
Gaylords, Cobras, Latin King Nation, whichever side of town.
Blacks, Hispanics, Asian ghettos, liberals, ethnic whites,
Grant Park concerts, open hydrants, steamy summer nights.
Hot tamales, sweet pierogis, steak and baked puhtaytuhs,
Deep dish pizza, lox and bagels, hot dogs with tuhmaytuhs.
Cub fan/Bud man, Sweetness, Dawson, Jordan in the air,
Rostenkowski, Jesse Jackson, Richie Daley--mare.
Get the vote out, play the races, city council wars,
movers, shakers, big deal makers, votes behind closed doors.
Buildings rising, futures climbing, traders at the Merc.,
homeless families, jobless workers looking for some work.
Busiest airport, biggest shoulders, city on the make,
hot air rising, east wind blowing, cooler by the lake.

July 31, 1989

— From untitled manuscript

== Poetry ==
Shefsky was influenced by notable poets, such as Emily Dickinson, William Blake, and E. E. Cummings. His eponymous work What Emily (2011) was largely written in the style of Dickinson, utilizing short rhyming lyric quatrains. This was in line with what his friend Abe Young, called his "unquenchable worldplay".

Not all of Shefsky's works, however, were written in quatrains nor did they always follow a strict rhyme scheme. Some of his works, such as the following, could be considered free-verse, yet demonstrate his love of word-play:

Professor Bacon speaks tenderly of tensive-
ness; I am less at ease.
That is, I am more at ease
being more at ease,
having taught myself
to be untaut, that is,
to run a quite tight ship.
Into my poetry I’ll permit
of it none, nor
syntactical mischief
disingenuous enjamb
mint or wintry wordplay.
No slant rhymes.
Or dithyrambs

— 'Professor Bacon Speaks Tenderly' from 'If Bees Are Few' by Alan Shefsky

== Works ==
Oh to be strong
as a man is to be strong.
Oh, and how might that be?
asks the garden of me.

I long to be hungry
to be red and hungry,
to quiver
as the hummingbird’s quiver.

Alone says the tree
is alone, as though
I didn’t already know;
I can see

the ground giving to the day
as the day falls away.

— From "Any May Be Swift: Poetry 2005-08"
- Amelia Absent, Amelia Present (Clay Springs Press, 1995)
- Blue Curtains— 2001-04
- Any May Be Swift— 2005-08
- If Bees are Few— 2009-11
- What Emily (Magnolia Press Collective, 2011)
- Glee (Magnolia Press, 2012)
- Throw Me from the Window an Apple— 2013
