= Sergio Insunza =

Chilean lawyer, politician and activist

Sergio Insunza Barrios (May 5, 1919 – July 19, 2014) was a Chilean lawyer, politician and human rights activist. He served as the last Minister of Justice within the government of President Salvador Allende from November 2, 1972, until September 11, 1973. His tenure as Justice Minister ended with the 1973 Chilean coup d'état and overthrow of President Allende om September 11, 1973.

Insunza died on July 19, 2014, at the age of 94.
