= Michael Zinni =

American golf coach

Michael Zinni (September 10, 1948 – July 29, 2014) was a professional golfer.

== Career ==
Zinni was the head coach of the Minnesota State University, Mankato golf team from 2003 to 2009.

He also played on the Champions Tour for senior golfers. He was the head golf professional at the Mankato Golf Club.

Zinni died on July 29, 2014, at Mayo Clinic from a lung infection.
