= William F. Enneking =

American orthopaedic oncologist

William F. Enneking (1926–2014) was an American orthopaedic oncologist. Born in Wisconsin on May 9, 1926, he earned his Doctorate of Medicine (MD) from the University of Wisconsin in 1949. He spent the majority of his career as professor of orthopaedic oncology at the University of Florida. He served as president of the American Orthopaedic Association from 1983 to 1984. The Enneking Classification for osteosarcoma, which he developed, influences prognosis and treatment for patients with the disease.

From 1980 to his retirement in 2005, Enneking held the Eugene L Jewett Professor of Orthopedics at the University of Florida. Subsequently, he was appointed as a professor emeritus.

== Selected works ==
- Musculoskeletal Tumor Surgery
