= Waltraud Bundschuh =

German politician (1928–2014)

- Born: 7 March 1928; Würzburg, Bavaria, Germany
- Died: 22 July 2014 (aged 86)
- Occupation: Politician
- Political party: Christian Social Union of Bavaria

Waltraud Bundschuh (7 March 1928 – 22 July 2014) was a German politician from the Christian Social Union of Bavaria. She was a member of the Landtag of Bavaria from 1962 to 1978.
