= James Stillwell =

Owner of the Seattle Mariners (1935–2014)

James Fremont Stillwell, Jr. (May 15, 1935 – July 14, 2014) was one of the original owners of the Seattle Mariners baseball team. The original ownership group, which included entertainer Danny Kaye, took control of the team on February 6, 1976. It held control until January 14, 1981, when George Argyros became principal owner of the club.

Stillwell was born in Seattle, Washington and attended Roosevelt High School before going to the University of Washington. He inherited his father's construction company, Stillwell Construction, and eventually became the President of the Associated General Contractors of Washington. He died in Seattle.
