= Nathan Reiber =

Polish-born Canadian businessman and Florida real estate developer

- Born: October 14, 1927; Częstochowa, Poland
- Died: July 1, 2014 (aged 86); Aventura, Florida, US
- Resting place: Lakeside Memorial Park, Doral, Florida
- Citizenship: Polish, Canadian, American

Nathan Reiber (October 14, 1927 — July 1, 2014) was a Polish-born Canadian businessman, lawyer, philanthropist, and real-estate developer in Miami.

== Early life ==
Reiber was born in 1927 in Częstochowa, Poland in a Polish-Jewish family and in 1929 emigrated to Montreal, Canada with his parents and siblings, when he was 2 years old. He grew up in Montreal and Edmonton, Canada.

== Career ==
Reiber graduated from the University of Alberta law school and became a lawyer in 1953. Reiber eventually moved to Ontario settling in Burlington to practice law and in the late 1970s, he relocated to Florida.

In the early 1980s, Reiber was charged by Canadian authorities with tax evasion. He eventually pled guilty and paid a $60,000 fine. In 1984, Reiber resigned as a lawyer, after the Law Society of Upper Canada found that he had committed professional misconduct by failing to cooperate with an inquiry into the tax charges that had been filed against him.

In Florida, Reiber headed a construction company, Nattel Construction Inc., as well as a team of developers, who developed many apartment buildings along Collins Avenue in Florida. Reiber ran the company along with Canadian business partners and real estate moguls Nathan Goldlist and Mendel Tenenbaum.

Reiber died in Aventura, Florida in 2014 at age 86. After his death, he became the subject of international attention because of his role in the development and construction of the Champlain Towers South condominium in Surfside, Florida, which partially collapsed on June 24, 2021, killing 98 people.
