= Ralph C. Thompson =

Canadian judge and lawyer (died 2014)

Ralph C. Thompson (c. 1947 – July 9, 2014) was a Canadian judge and lawyer. Thompson served as a member of the Provincial Court of Prince Edward Island from 1985 until 2005, including two tenures as the Provincial Court's Chief Justice, 1985–1990 and again from 1995 to 2000. He retired from the court in 2005.

Thompson, a lawyer, practiced as a Crown prosecutor, departmental solicitor and director of legal services on Prince Edward Island. He also practiced within Campbell, Mitchell, Lea, Cheverie and Thompson, a private law firm.

The PEI provincial government appointed Thompson as a commissioner on land and local governance in 2008.

He died from cancer on July 9, 2014, at Prince County Hospital in Summerside, Prince Edward Island, the age of 67. A resident of Wilmot Valley, Thompson was survived by his wife, Karen (née MacRae) Thompson.
