= Praxis =

Praxis may refer to:

== Philosophy and religion ==
- Praxis (process), the process by which a theory, lesson, or skill is enacted, practised, embodied, or realised
- Praxis model, a way of doing theology
- Praxis (Byzantine Rite), the practice of faith, especially worship
- Christian theological praxis, the practice of the Gospel in the world
- The Book of Acts (Greek: Πράξεις Ἀποστόλων, romanized: Práxeis Apostólōn), or a reading from it
- Praxis School, a Marxist humanist philosophical movement
- Praxis (British philosophy journal), a journal of philosophy published by the University of Manchester
- Praxis (Yugoslav philosophy journal), a journal of philosophy published by Praxis School
  - Praxis International, the continuation of Praxis and predecessor of Constellations

== Organizations and business ==
- Praxis (store), a Dutch chain of hardware stores
- Altran Praxis, a British software company
- Praxis Care, a social-care charity based in Belfast, Northern Ireland
- Praxis Ethiopia, an international organisation addressing poverty in Ethiopia
- Praxis (trade union), Irish trade union for professional artists

== The arts ==
- Praxis, a novel by Fay Weldon, published in 1978
- The Praxis, a 2002 novel by Walter Jon Williams
- Praxis (album), by Cecil Taylor recorded live in Italy in 1968
- Praxis (band), an experimental rock project led by Bill Laswell
- Praxis (dance music act)
- Praxis (art collaborative), an American art duo
- PRAXIS: a journal of writing + building, published by the Ohio State University College of Engineering

== In fiction ==
- Praxis, a fictional moon in the film Star Trek VI: The Undiscovered Country
- Praxis, a metanational corporation in Kim Stanley Robinson's Mars trilogy
- Praxis, a fictional underground metropolis in the SyFy series Sanctuary
- Praxis Kit, an item used to unlock various abilities in several of the Deus Ex video games
- "Praxis", an episode of the podcast Alice Isn't Dead
- Baron Praxis, an antagonist in the 2003 video game Jak II

== Other uses ==
- Praxis (moth), a genus of moths of the family Noctuidae
- Praxis Discussion Series, televised discussion on international development established by the World Bank in Australia
- Praxis intervention, in social work, a methodology for intervention within communities
- Praxis (company), company formed in 2019 that plans to create a city in Uruguay
- Praxis Rabemananjara (born 1987), Malagasy footballer
- Praxis test, a United States teacher certification exam
- PRAXXIS, (with added X) a feminist design atelier at Manchester School of Architecture led by Helen Iball (also known as Helen Aston).

== See also ==
- Practice (disambiguation)
- Praxeology
- Orthopraxy, correct conduct in religions
