= Branko Despot =

Croatian philosopher

Branko Despot (born July 6, 1942, Zagreb) is a Croatian philosopher.

He is the son of Miroslava Despot, a prominent economic and cultural historian. After finishing gymnasium in Zagreb in 1961, he graduated in philosophy and Ancient Greek in 1965 at the Faculty of Philosophy in Zagreb, where he also received his PhD in 1975 with a thesis on the philosophy of Vladimir Dvorniković. He worked as a researcher at the Institute of Philosophy since 1968, and since 1971 at the Faculty of Philosophy in Zagreb, at first as an assistant, as a docent (1979–84) and then as a professor at the Chair of History of Philosophy at the Department of Philosophy. He is a member of the Croatian Writers' Association and PEN International.

His research covers history of philosophy, Ancient Greek philosophy, German classical and contemporary philosophy as well as Croatian contemporary thought.

He published treatises and papers in journals and periodicals such as Vidici (1968), Filosofija (1969–70), Praxis (1969–71), Problemi (1969–90), Kamov (1970), Kolo (1970), Pitanja (1971), Dijalog (1977), Polja (1978), Gordogan (1979, 1982, 1983, 1985), Filozofska istraživanja (1984, 1986, 1988), Godišnjak za povijest filozofije (1984, 1990), Synthesis philosophica (1986) and others.

He published two monographs that deal with the history of philosophy of Đuro Arnold and Vladimir Dvorniković. He translated from German works such as Nicolai Hartmann's Osnovne crte jedne metafizike spoznaje (Zagreb, 1976), Eugen Fink's Nietzscheova filozofija (Zagreb 1981) and Adam Schaff's Komunistički pokret na raspuću (Zagreb 1985).

He is a regular member of the Croatian Academy of Sciences and Arts since 2010.

== Works ==
- Filozofija Gjure Arnolda, 1970, Zagreb
- Vidokrug apsoluta. Prilog indiskutabilnoj dijagnostici nihilizma., 1972^{1}, 1989^{2}, 1992^{2}
- Filozofiranje Vladimira Dvornikovića, 1975, Zagreb
- Logički fragmenti, 1978, Zagreb
- Filozofski dnevnik, 1982, Zagreb
- Uvod u filozofiju, 1988, Zagreb
- Sitnice, 1991, Zagreb
- Filozofiranje?, 1995
- Filozofija kao sistem?, 1999
- Filozofija?, 2000,
- Filozofijom kroz nefilozofiju, 2010
