= Praxis (process) =

Process by which a theory, lesson, or skill is enacted, embodied, or realized

Praxis is the process by which a theory, lesson, or skill is enacted, embodied, realized, applied, or put into practice. "Praxis" may also refer to the act of engaging, applying, exercising, realizing, or practising ideas. This has been a recurrent topic in the field of philosophy, discussed in the writings of Plato, Aristotle, St. Augustine, Francis Bacon, Immanuel Kant, Søren Kierkegaard, Karl Marx, Martin Heidegger, Hannah Arendt, Jean-Paul Sartre, and many others. It has meaning in the political, educational, spiritual and medical realms.

== Origins ==
The word praxis is from Ancient Greek: πρᾶξις, romanized: praxis. In Ancient Greek the word praxis referred to activity engaged in by free people. The philosopher Aristotle held that there were three basic activities of humans: theoria (thinking), poiesis (making), and praxis (doing). Corresponding to these activities were three types of knowledge: theoretical, the end goal being truth; poietical, the end goal being production; and practical, the end goal being action. Aristotle further divided the knowledge derived from praxis into ethics, economics, and politics. He also distinguished between eupraxia (εὐπραξία, "good praxis") and dyspraxia (δυσπραξία, "bad praxis, misfortune").

== Cieszkowski ==
August Cieszkowski was one of the earliest philosophers to use the term praxis to mean "action oriented towards changing society" in his 1838 work Prolegomena zur Historiosophie (Prolegomena to a Historiosophy). Cieszkowski argued that while absolute truth had been achieved in the speculative philosophy of Hegel, the deep divisions and contradictions in man's consciousness could only be resolved through concrete practical activity that directly influences social life.

== Marxism ==
Karl Marx uses the term "praxis" in two of his early works: the Economic and Philosophic Manuscripts of 1844 and the Theses on Feuerbach (1845). In the former work, Marx contrasts the free, conscious productive activity of human beings with the unconscious, compulsive production of animals. He also affirms the primacy of praxis over theory, claiming that theoretical contradictions can only be resolved through practical activity. In the latter work, revolutionary practice is a central theme:

The question whether objective truth can be attributed to human thinking is not a question of theory but is a practical question. Man must prove the truth — i.e. the reality and power, the this-sidedness of his thinking in practice. The dispute over the reality or non-reality of thinking that is isolated from practice is a purely scholastic question. (2nd thesis)

The coincidence of the changing of circumstances and of human activity or self-change [Selbstveränderung] can be conceived and rationally understood only as revolutionary practice. (3rd thesis)

All social life is essentially practical. All the mysteries which lead theory towards mysticism find their rational solution in human praxis and in the comprehension of this praxis. (8th thesis)

Philosophers have hitherto only interpreted the world in various ways; the point is to change it. (11th thesis)

Marx here criticizes the materialist philosophy of Ludwig Feuerbach for envisaging objects in a contemplative way. Marx argues that perception is itself a component of man's practical relationship to the world. To understand the world does not mean considering it from the outside, judging it morally or explaining it scientifically. Society cannot be changed by reformers who understand its needs, only by the revolutionary praxis of the mass whose interest coincides with that of the working class. This will be an act of society understanding itself, in which the subject changes the object by the very fact of understanding it. Praxis can refer to the free, universal, creative and self-creative activity through which man creates and changes his world and himself. Praxis is an activity unique to man, which distinguishes him from all other beings.

Seemingly inspired by the Theses, the nineteenth century socialist Antonio Labriola called Marxism the "philosophy of praxis". This description of Marxism would appear again in Antonio Gramsci's Prison Notebooks and the writings of the members of the Frankfurt School. Praxis is also an important theme for Marxist thinkers such as Georg Lukács, Karl Korsch, Karel Kosik and Henri Lefebvre, and was seen as the central concept of Marx's thought by Yugoslavia's Praxis School, which established a journal of that name in 1964.

== Jean-Paul Sartre ==
In the Critique of Dialectical Reason, Jean-Paul Sartre posits a view of individual praxis as the basis of human history. In his view, praxis is an attempt to negate human need. In a revision of Marxism and his earlier existentialism, Sartre argues that the fundamental relation of human history is scarcity. Conditions of scarcity generate competition for resources, exploitation of one over another and division of labor, which in its turn creates struggle between classes. Each individual experiences the other as a threat to his or her own survival and praxis; it is always a possibility that one's individual freedom limits another's. Sartre recognizes both natural and man-made constraints on freedom: he calls the non-unified practical activity of humans the "practico-inert". Sartre opposes to individual praxis a "group praxis" that fuses each individual to be accountable to each other in a common purpose. Sartre sees a mass movement in a successful revolution as the best exemplar of such a fused group.

== Hannah Arendt ==
In The Human Condition, Hannah Arendt argues that Western philosophy too often has focused on the contemplative life (vita contemplativa) and has neglected the active life (vita activa). This has frequently led humanity to miss much of the relevance of philosophical ideas to real life. For Arendt, praxis is the highest and most important level of the active life. She argues that more philosophers need to engage in everyday political action or praxis, which she sees as the true realization of human freedom. According to Arendt, our capacity to analyze ideas, wrestle with them, and engage in active praxis is what makes us uniquely human.

In Maurizio Passerin d'Etreves's estimation,

Arendt's theory of action and her revival of the ancient notion of praxis represent one of the most original contributions to twentieth century political thought.... Moreover, by viewing action as a mode of human togetherness, Arendt is able to develop a conception of participatory democracy which stands in direct contrast to the bureaucratized and elitist forms of politics so characteristic of the modern epoch.

== Education ==
Praxis is used by educators to describe a recurring passage through a cyclical process of experiential learning, such as the cycle described and popularised by David A. Kolb.

Paulo Freire defines praxis in Pedagogy of the Oppressed as "reflection and action directed at the structures to be transformed." Through praxis, oppressed people can acquire a critical awareness of their own condition, and, with teacher-students and students-teachers, struggle for liberation.

In the British Channel 4 television documentary New Order: Play at Home, Factory Records owner Tony Wilson describes praxis as "doing something, and then only afterwards, finding out why you did it".

Praxis may be described as a form of critical thinking and comprises the combination of reflection and action. Praxis can be viewed as a progression of cognitive and physical actions:

- Taking the action
- Considering the impacts of the action
- Analysing the results of the action by reflecting upon it
- Altering and revising conceptions and planning following reflection
- Implementing these plans in further actions

This creates a cycle which can be viewed in terms of educational settings, learners and educational facilitators.

Furthermore, Gramsci (1999) emphasises the power of praxis in Selections from the Prison Notebooks by stating that "The philosophy of praxis does not tend to leave the simple in their primitive philosophy of common sense but rather to lead them to a higher conception of life".

To reveal the inadequacies of religion, folklore, intellectualism and other such 'one-sided' forms of reasoning, Gramsci appeals directly in his later work to Marx's 'philosophy of praxis', describing it as a 'concrete' mode of reasoning. This principally involves the juxtaposition of a dialectical and scientific audit of reality; against all existing normative, ideological, and therefore counterfeit accounts. Essentially a 'philosophy' based on 'a practice', Marx's philosophy, is described correspondingly in this manner, as the only 'philosophy' that is at the same time a 'history in action' or a 'life' itself (Gramsci, Hoare and Nowell-Smith, 1972, p. 332).

== Spirituality ==
Praxis is also key in meditation and spirituality, where emphasis is placed on gaining first-hand experience of concepts and certain areas, such as union with the Divine, which can only be explored through praxis due to the inability of the finite mind (and its tool, language) to comprehend or express the infinite.

== Medicine ==
Praxis is the ability to perform voluntary skilled movements. The partial or complete inability to do so in the absence of primary sensory or motor impairments is known as apraxia.

== See also ==
- Apraxia
- Christian theological praxis
- Hexis
- Ivory tower
- Lex artis
- Mass line
- New class
- On Practice
- Orthopraxy
- Practical philosophy
- Praxeology
- Praxis Discussion Series
- Praxis (disambiguation)
- Praxis intervention
- Praxis school
- Practice (social theory)
- Seek truth from facts
