= Yugoslav philosophy =

Yugoslav philosophy parallels the evolution of philosophy in Europe, like all European countries claim in general. Yet Yugoslav philosophy first drew upon its own Christian ethos and logos to sustain itself under centuries of Turkish, Venetian, Hungarian and Austrian invasions, then from the broader currents of European philosophy, and in turn contributed to their growth.

== History ==
Modern philosophy in the Yugoslav territories started with the formation of University of Belgrade in the early 19th century as a liberal court philosophy, replicating theories of John Stuart Mill, Herbert Spencer and other Western philosophers. They wrote mostly textbook theories about broader subjects such as logic, psychology and pedagogy and the most prominent figure of this period was Alimpije Vasiljević.

At the end of 19th century, this school was surpassed in popularity by Branislav Petronijević, leading philosopher of the Kingdom of Yugoslavia. His idealist rationalist metaphysical system was known as "hypermetaphysics", with his three principal philosophical works being Principi Metafizike (Principles of Metaphysics), O Vrednosti života (On the Value of Life) and Istorija novije filozofije (History of Contemporary Philosophy). Petronijević had many students and followers, among others Ksenija Atanasijević, the first major female Yugoslav philosopher, who slid into more mystic theories of new scholasticism.

After the 6 January Dictatorship, Yugoslav philosophy as a whole moved towards the political right, with the thinkers such as Vladimir Dvorniković obtaining positions in the government. Dvorniković was a prominent advocate of Yugoslav integral nationalism and his most famous work was Karakterologija Jugoslovena (Characterology of the Yugoslavs). There was also a strong irrationalist current with Albert Bazala, who became rector of University of Zagreb in 1932. At the time, universities were under strong religious influence and the most prominent thinker of this school was the Slovenian Aleš Ušeničnik, a philosopher of neo-Thomism.

In parallel, the social democratic movement had its own prominent theoreticians such as Dimitrije Tucović and Sima Marković, who was later killed in the Great Purge. After World War II, socialists took power and rejected all former philosophy as idealistic and bourgeois. Dialectical materialism was introduced, with revolutionary philosophers such as Boris Ziherl or Dušan Nedeljković.

This theory later evolved towards Marxist humanism with the Praxis School, which originated in Zagreb and Belgrade during the 1960s. Prominent figures among the school's founders include Gajo Petrović, Milan Kangrga, Mihailo Marković and Predrag Vranicki. From 1964 to 1974 they published the journal Praxis, which was renowned as one of the leading international journals in Marxist theory.

Apart from Praxis, Yugoslav philosophy was especially strong in SR Slovenia with the Marxist Božidar Debenjak and phenomenological school of Tine Hribar. In the seventies, the Ljubljana Lacanian School with the journal Problemi (Problems) was founded by young followers of the theories of the French psychoanalyst Jacques Lacan. A specific feature of the Ljubljana School was to connect the Marxist and Hegelian traditions with Lacanian psychoanalysis and structuralism, with its most famous philosopher being Slavoj Žižek.

After the breakup of Yugoslavia, newly formed countries continued their philosophical tradition in various directions, but mostly abandoned the principles of Marxism.
