= Branislav Petronijević =

Serbian philosopher and paleontologist (1875–1954)

- Бранислав Петронијевић
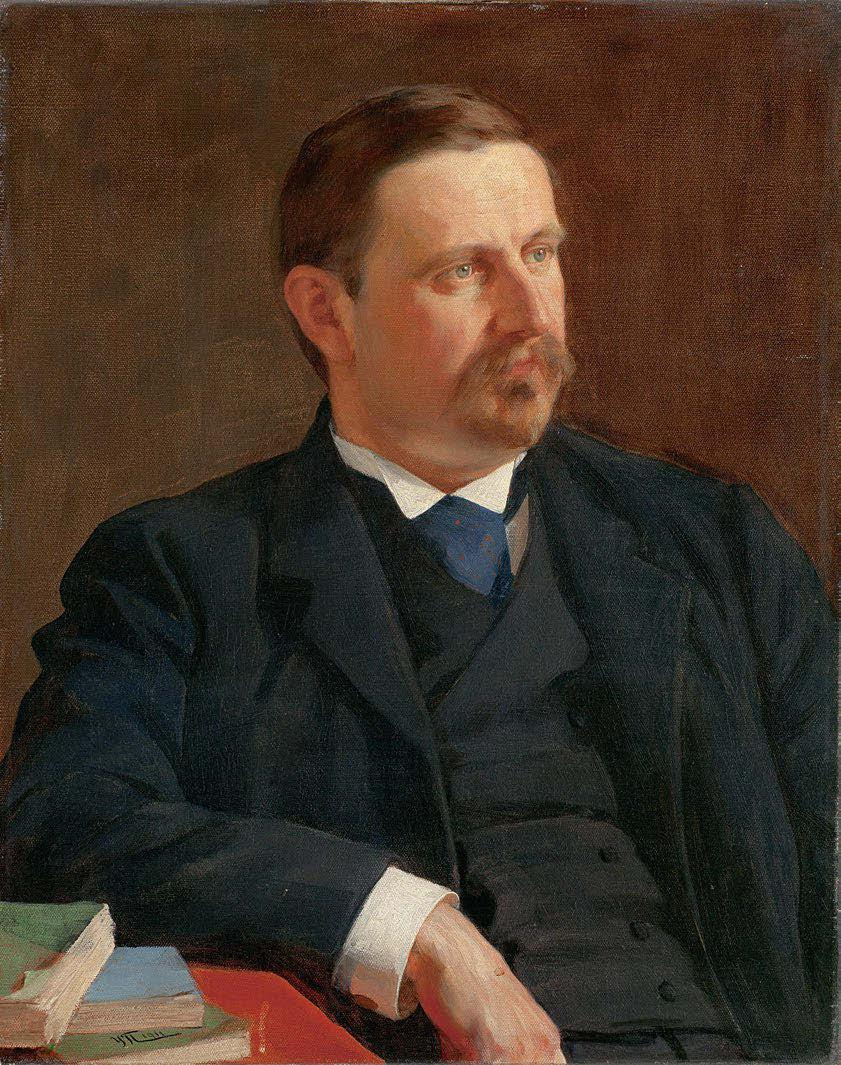
- Born: 6 April 1875; Sovljak, Principality of Serbia
- Died: 4 March 1954 (aged 78); Belgrade, Federal People's Republic of Yugoslavia

Education
- Education: University of Vienna; University of Leipzig
- Thesis: Der Satz vom Grunde, eine logische Untersuchung (The principle of sufficient reason, a logical investigation) (1898)
- Academic advisor: Johannes Volkelt

Philosophical work
- Era: 20th-century philosophy
- Region: Western philosophy
- School: Yugoslav philosophy Objective idealism
- Institutions: University of Belgrade; Serbian Royal Academy
- Notable students: Ksenija Atanasijević
- Main interests: Metaphysics; Epistemology; Experimental psychology
- Notable ideas: Monopluralism; Empirio-rationalist epistemology Hypermetaphysics

Branislav Petronijević (Serbian Cyrillic: Бранислав Петронијевић; also spelled Petronievics; 6 April 1875 – 4 March 1954) was a Serbian philosopher and paleontologist, and a professor at the University of Belgrade. He is regarded as one of the most prominent Serbian philosophers of the first half of the 20th century and played a central role in the institutionalization of academic philosophy in Serbia and Yugoslavia.

Trained in Vienna and Leipzig under figures such as Ludwig Boltzmann, Johannes Volkelt and Wilhelm Wundt, Petronijević developed an original metaphysical system that he called "monopluralism", a synthesis of Spinoza's substance monism and Leibniz's monadological pluralism shaped by the idealist tradition of Hermann Lotze and Eduard von Hartmann. In his self-described "empirio-rationalist" epistemology he held that immediate experience both presents reality as it is and yields the basic logical and metaphysical axioms, including the principle of sufficient reason, from which he sought to derive an "absolute metaphysics". His major systematic works, notably Prinzipien der Metaphysik (Principles of metaphysics, 1904–1911), develop a discrete, finitist conception of space built from simple qualitative points, a "hypermetaphysics" concerned with the most general oppositions of the One and the Many, and a broader program that also encompasses the foundations of mathematics, experimental psychology, aesthetics, and practical philosophy.

Alongside his metaphysical and epistemological writings, Petronijević made contributions to the philosophy of science and to natural history, publishing on universal evolution and proposing an interpretation of Dollo's law as well as what he called the Law of Non-correlative Evolution. In paleontology he was among the early specialists on Archaeopteryx, introducing the genus Archaeornis and several related names. However, later work has generally not adopted these taxonomic arrangements.

A participant in the Serbian army's Great Retreat in World War I, he served as a war correspondent, lectured in Paris and London, and wrote the biographical preface to the 1922 English edition of Roger Joseph Boscovich's A Theory of Natural Philosophy. He was a full member and later secretary of the Serbian Academy of Sciences and Arts, co-founded the Serbian Philosophical Society, mentored the philosopher Ksenija Atanasijević, and was nominated for the Nobel Prize in Literature in 1941 and 1947.

== Biography ==
=== Early life ===
Branislav Petronijević was born in the small village of Sovljak, near Ub, Serbia, on 6 April (25 March, O.S.) 1875, the son of Marko Jeremić, a theologian. The last name Petronijević stems from Branislav's grandfather, Petronije Jeremić, a local priest. His father changed Branislav's last name to reduce pressure at school, as the Jeremić family were prominent supporters of the exiled Karađorđević dynasty.

He studied at the Valjevo Gymnasium and at the Velika škola in Belgrade.

=== Education and early work ===
In 1894, Petronijević went to Vienna to pursue a degree in medicine, on a scholarship awarded by the Tamnava srez. Petronijević joined the Philosophical Society of the University of Vienna and studied under Ludwig Boltzmann. After three semesters in Vienna he enrolled at the University of Leipzig, where he studied philosophy under Johannes Volkelt, Wilhelm Ostwald, and Ernst Mach. There, he wrote Der ontologische Beweis für das Dasein des Absoluten (The ontological proof for the existence of the absolute) in 1897, and successfully defended his thesis Der Satz vom Grunde (The principle of sufficient reason) in 1898. Having studied during this time under Wilhelm Wundt, Petronijević later published several works in experimental psychology on the observation of the transparent and on the depth and observation of compound colours. In Leipzig, Petronijević received financial help from former bishop Nikanor Ružičić, with whom he practiced the German language.

In 1898 he was given the title of docent at the Belgrade Higher School at the request of professor Ljubomir Nedić. He taught the German language and philosophical propaedeutics at the Third Belgrade Gymnasium. Petronijević was promoted to the post of associate professor in 1899, and then full professor in 1903. Three years later when the school developed into the University of Belgrade, Petronijević was demoted back to associate professor. He was simultaneously elected correspondent member of the Serbian Royal Academy on 3 February 1906. Petronijević found this humiliating, and declined the post, his decision coming into effect in 1910. During this time, Petronijević also taught art theory at Rista and Beta Vukanović's Serbian Art School in Belgrade.

It was during this period that he thought out and developed what is distinctive in his philosophical doctrine. His two major works in metaphysics, Prinzipien der Metaphysik (Principles of metaphysics) and Die typischen Geometrien und das Unendliche (The typical geometries and the infinite), were published during this period.

=== World War I ===
At the outbreak of World War I he turned to journalism, becoming a war correspondent for the Serbian War Office Press Bureau, induced by Dragutin Dimitrijević "Apis", his childhood friend. In 1915 he joined the Serbian army's retreat through Albania. After reaching Greece, he was sent first to Rome where he stayed for four months. After Rome, Petronijević spent several months in Paris, where he taught two courses at the Sorbonne, on universal evolution and on the value of life.

Finally, he spent the longest part of the war in London with the Serbian Legation, along with politician Nikola Pašić, geographer Jovan Cvijić, professors Bogdan Popović and his brother Pavle Popović. There, Petronijević worked on an English translation of Theoria Philosophiæ Naturalis (A Theory of Natural Philosophy) by Roger Joseph Boscovich, together with Čedomilj Mijatović and Nikolaj Velimirović. The 1763 Venetian edition of the book was translated by James Mark Child, and finally published in 1922 by the Open Court Publishing Company, funded in part by the newly created Kingdom of Serbs, Croats and Slovenes. Petronijević wrote the preface, titled Life of Roger Joseph Boscovich. Parts of it were severely criticized by Vladimir Varićak in 1925 for various factual errors, among other things for asserting Boscovich's exclusively Serbian ethnicity, and listing his birth date inaccurately.

While in London, Petronijević met with Bertrand Russell, who wrote:

A man who impressed me, not so much by his ability as by his resolute absorption in philosophy even under the most arduous circumstances, was the only Yugoslav philosopher of our time, whose name was Branislav Petroniević. I met him only once, in the year 1917. The only language we both knew was German and so we had to use it, although it caused people in the streets to look at us with suspicion. The Serbs had recently carried out their heroic retreat before the German invaders, and I was anxious to get a first-hand account of this retreat from him, but he only wanted to expound his doctrine that the number of points in space is finite and can be estimated by considerations derived from the theory of numbers. The consequence of this difference in our interests was a somewhat curious conversation. I said, "Were you in the great retreat?" and he replied, "Yes, but you see the way to calculate the number of points in space is." I said, "Were you on foot?" and he said, "Yes, you see the number must be a prime." I said, "Did you not try to get a horse?" and he said, "I started on a horse, but I fell off, and it should not be difficult to find out what prime." In spite of all my efforts, I could get nothing further from him about anything so trivial as the Great War. I admired his capacity for intellectual detachment from the accidents of his corporeal existence, in which I felt that few ancient Stoics could have rivalled him. After the First War he was employed by the Yugoslav Government to bring out a magnificent edition of the eighteenth-century Yugoslav philosopher Boscovich, but what happened to him after that I do not know.

— Bertrand Russell

=== Later life ===
After the war he left London and went back to his teaching post at the University of Belgrade, where he was again appointed full professor in 1919. On 16 February 1920, he was elected into the Serbian Royal Academy.

From 1918 to 1922, Petronijević notably mentored Ksenija Atanasijević, later a prominent Serbian female intellectual and early Serbian feminist writer.

During the Interbellum, Petronijević was an active participant in European philosophy, and considered himself a worthy philosopher who transcended his "parochial" limitations. He deemed himself one of the 15 "great philosophers" of history, along with Aristotle, Leibniz and Hegel. Beside "great philosophers", Petronijević mentions "significant philosophers" and "philosophic writers".

Petronijević retired from the university in 1927. He served as secretary of the Serbian Royal Academy from February 1932 to February 1933 and founded the Serbian Philosophical Society in 1938, together with Vladimir Dvorniković, Justin Popović and others. The third volume of his Principles of Metaphysics was destroyed in an air raid in April 1941. He held lectures at the German Scientific Institute during the occupation of Yugoslavia. After the war, he traveled to France several times and started writing poetry. Petronijević was nominated for the Nobel Prize in Literature in 1941 and 1947.

Petronijević died at the Hotel Balkan in Belgrade on 4 March 1954. He was 78. He never married.

== Writings ==
=== Philosophy ===
Petronijević considered himself a "born metaphysician" and devoted his career to constructing a systematic metaphysical doctrine. Although original in its conclusions, his system shows the influence of Hermann Lotze and Eduard von Hartmann. At the level of method, Petronijević employs what has been described as a modified Hegelian dialectic.

In epistemology, Petronijević described his position as "empirio-rationalist". He held that immediate experience not only presents reality as it is, but also provides the basis for fundamental logical laws and metaphysical axioms, including the laws of identity, non-contradiction and excluded middle together with the principle of sufficient reason, all of which he thought could be derived from the structure of what is directly given. In opposition to Immanuel Kant, Petronijević rejected a sharp separation between an "ideal" realm of consciousness and an "absolutely real" world of things-in-themselves, formulating instead a "principle of the absolute reality of consciousness" according to which whatever is present in consciousness is real rather than a merely illusory "mere representation". From the necessity of these basic truths and the reality of experience he inferred an identity of thought and being, and on that basis defended the possibility of an "absolute metaphysics" yielding apodictic knowledge of being itself.

Within this empirio-rationalist framework, Petronijević gave a central role to the principle of sufficient reason at the level of logic. He regarded this principle as the highest principle of knowledge and described it as a "material fundamental law of thought" that expresses the necessary mutual co-belonging of our thoughts. In his account it articulates what he called a "positive contradictory relation", in which a given state is internally tied to the negation of another state. In his early logical treatise Der Satz vom Grunde (The principle of sufficient reason, 1898) he understood it to mean that everything that exists or can be conceived has an inner sufficient reason for being as it is and not otherwise.

In metaphysics, Petronijević aimed to reconstruct ontology with the help of exact mathematics. On the basis of what he took to be logically necessary facts of experience, together with the basic logical axioms, he held that metaphysics could be established as a science that derives the existence of the external world and its quantitative structure in space, time and motion, as well as its qualitative structure, by means of the concept of the point. He developed this program in his main systematic work Prinzipien der Metaphysik (Principles of metaphysics), whose first volume appeared in Heidelberg in 1904. On this basis he developed a "new geometry" in which space is treated as discrete rather than continuous and reality rests on a discrete space composed of a finite number of simple qualitative points that are separated by unreal points understood as "acts of negation". He distinguished between real "central points" (Mittelpunkte) and unreal "intermediate points" (Zwischenpunkte). The world as a manifold is possible, on this view, only because each pair of real points is separated by an unreal point, so that negation acquires a fundamental role in his ontology as a basic structuring principle of reality. Petronijević's metaphysical standpoint combines a plurality of conscious monads with an underlying universal substance, and he characterized it as a synthesis of Spinoza's monism and Leibniz's monadological pluralism, which he called "monopluralism".

In his later systematizations, Petronijević described the basic monadic entities as conscious monads or "points of will", so that the world develops from atoms, through these conscious monads, toward an all-encompassing whole. He held that the universe passes through static and dynamic phases and tends toward a final state of complete equilibrium or rest. He used the name "hypermetaphysics" for a further and more abstract division of philosophy, beyond metaphysics in the strict sense. In this part of the system he considered what he called the first principles of this process, such as the One and an infinitely divisible multiplicity. In contrast to Hegel's dialectic, this framework treats the opposed terms as contraries rather than strictly contradictory concepts and does not regard synthesis as an indispensable third stage, since, in his view, it may precede the antithesis or be absent wherever the antithesis presupposes the prior being of the thesis. On this account, genuine synthesis is required only in the single case of the contraries One and Many. Petronijević explicitly linked this level of inquiry to the Platonic tradition.

In practical philosophy, Petronijević defended the reality of free will and linked it to his theory of knowledge. In a 1908 essay on free will, moral responsibility and criminal responsibility, he argues that moral evaluation, punishment and repentance presuppose that human actions are not merely effects of natural causality and that a settled life without belief in free will is not possible. Since his epistemology does not allow for an absolute illusion or for a complete reduction of conscious acts to unconscious causes, the immediate experience of freedom is taken as an indubitable fact of consciousness and therefore as a necessary feature of reality. In a companion essay on the value of life and the possibility of happiness, Petronijević develops a doctrine that later commentators describe as "nihilistic and indifferentist" and that he himself calls "malistic", a middle position between optimism and pessimism. On this view, pain and pleasure are equally real, and by means of a quasi-quantitative comparison of their total balance, he distinguishes optimism, pessimism, "bonism" (a slight surplus of pleasure) and "malism" (a slight surplus of pain), ultimately defending malism as the most adequate description of human existence. Intense emotions contain more pain than pleasure, while long periods of emotional indifference predominate, so that happiness can exist only as a "relative happiness" of conscious life without strong positive or negative feelings.

In addition to his systematic work, Petronijević wrote extensively on the history of philosophy, religion and aesthetics. His collected works include detailed studies of Kant, Nietzsche and Njegoš, essays on Tolstoy's ethical doctrine and theory of art, interpretations of authors such as Carlyle, Renan and Eduard von Hartmann, and occasional writings on contemporary political questions.

=== Natural science ===
Timeline of Archaeopteryx discoveries until 2007

In 1917, Petronijević published on the Solnhofen Archaeopteryx material, beginning with a joint paper with Arthur Smith Woodward on the pectoral and pelvic arches of the London specimen of Archaeopteryx. In a footnote to that paper he introduced the binomen Archaeornis siemensi, thereby proposing Archaeornis as a separate genus for the Berlin specimen from the Solnhofen Limestone. In a later study on the pelvis, shoulder girdle and other elements of the London specimen, published in 1921, Petronijević coined the species name Archaeopteryx oweni and the family-group name Archaeornithidae.

Petronijević published a total of fourteen studies on Archaeopteryx, eleven of which were reprinted together in the ninth volume of his selected works, and his proposals and interpretations were widely discussed in contemporary paleontological literature. Subsequent opinions of the International Commission on Zoological Nomenclature placed Archaeopteryx oweni on the Official Index of Rejected and Invalid Names while conserving the widely used binomen Archaeopteryx lithographica, but left Archaeornis and Archaeornithidae as formally available names.

In 1923, Petronijević added a new species, M. ancestrale to the genus Moeritherium, excluding a skull and a mandible from those attributed to M. lyonsi on the basis of some cranial characters observed on the palatine and occipital. In his revision of the genus, Heinz Tobien considered the skull differences mentioned by Petronijević as intraspecific and sex-related variations and synonymised M. gracile, M. lyonsi and M. ancestrale, keeping only one species for the Qasr el Sagha Formation under the name M. lyonsi.

Petronijević's contributions to the philosophy of natural sciences are collected in his compilation L'évolution universelle. Exposé des preuves et des lois de l`évolution mondiale et des évolutions particulières (Universal evolution. Presentation of evidence and laws of global evolution and particular developments, 1921). Among them there are the explanation of Dollo's law of irreversibility, first described in Zakon nepovratne evolucije (Law of irreversible evolution, 1920), and the introduction of his own Law of Non-correlative Evolution with which he describes the mosaic evolution in Archaeopteryx.

Among his most notable contributions to the logical foundations of mathematics are his work on typical geometries, on the problem of the infinitude of space, the three-body problem, on difference quotients, and on mathematical induction. In psychology, he developed theories about the observation of the transparent and on the depth and observation of compound colours.

== Legacy ==
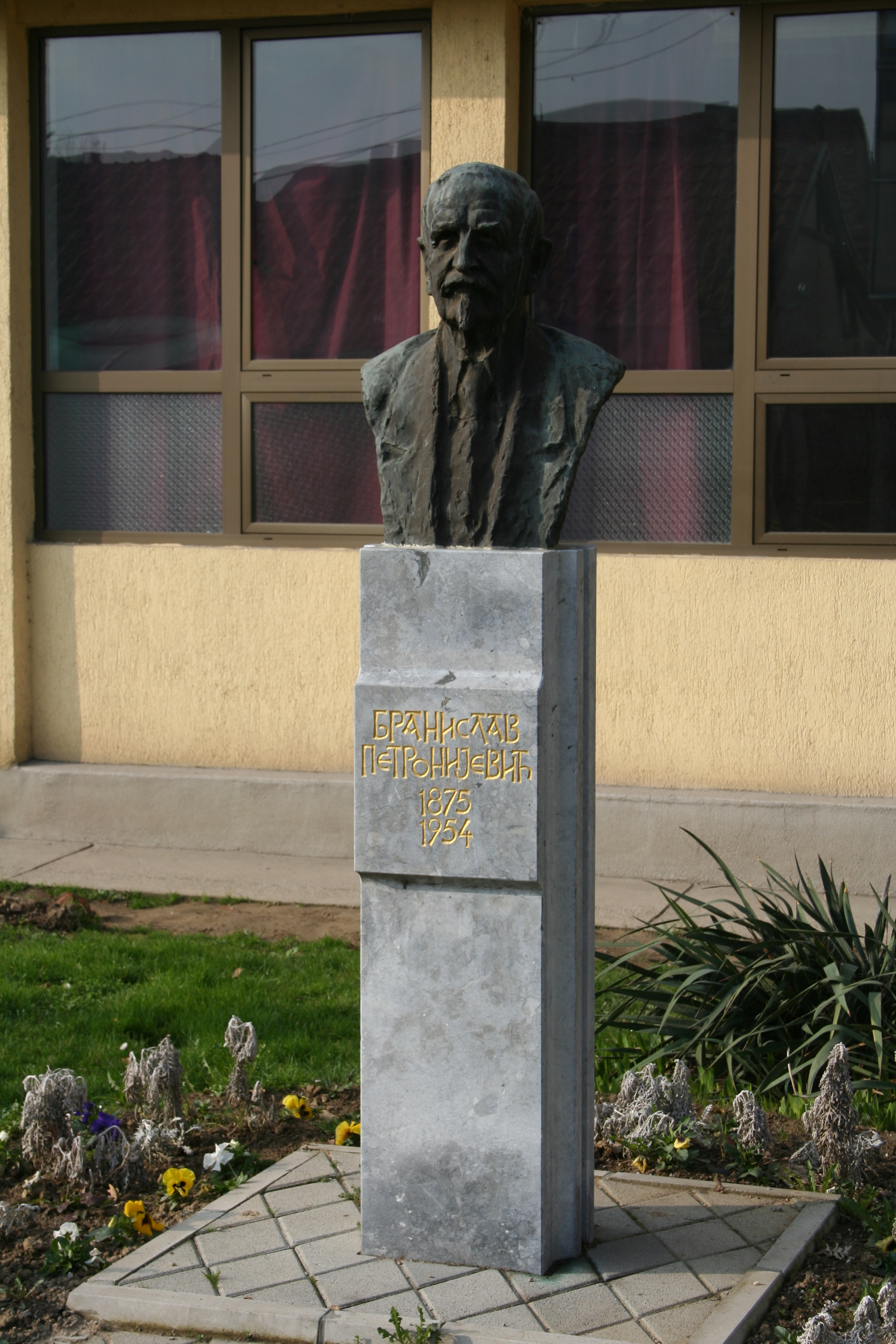
Bust of Branislav Petronijević in the town park in Ub

In 1957, the Department of Natural Science of the Serbian Academy of Sciences and Arts published a commemorative anthology of all Petronijević's publications. He was included in the 1993 book The 100 most prominent Serbs, published by the Serbian Academy of Sciences and Arts. A street in the Višnjička Banja neighborhood of Belgrade is named in his honor.

According to Miodrag Cekić, Petronijević's works in philosophy may have influenced Boltzmann's late system of philosophical classification. His theory of multi-dimensions as well as the theory of mathematical discontinuity also seems to have interested both Boltzmann and Mach.

== Bibliography ==
Works by Petronijević in English:

- Life of Roger Joseph Boscovich (preface to A Theory of Natural Philosophy by Roger Joseph Boscovich), Open Court Publishing Company, 1922.

Works by Petronijević in German:

- Der ontologische Beweis für das Dasein des Absoluten. Versuch einer Neubegründung mit besonderer Rücksicht auf das erkenntnistheoretische Grundproblem Leipzig : H. Haacke, 1897. (The Ontological Proof for the Existence of the Absolute. Attempt at a New Foundation with Special Regard to the Basic Problem of Epistemology)
- Der Satz vom Grunde. eine logische Untersuchung. Belgrade : Staatsdruckerei, 1898. (The Principle of Reason. A Logical Investigation)
- Prinzipien der Erkenntnislehre. Prolegomena zur absoluten Metaphysik. Berlin : Ernst Hoffmann & Co, 1900. (Principles of Epistemology. Prolegomena to Absolute Metaphysics)
- Prinzipien der Metaphysik. 2 vols. Heidelberg : Carl Winter's Universitätsbuchhandlung, 1904–1911. (Principles of Metaphysics)
- Die typischen Geometrien und das Unendliche. Heidelberg : C. Winter, 1907. (The Typical Geometries and the Infinite)
- Über den Begriff der zusammengesetzten Farbe. Leipzig : Barth, 1908. (On the Concept of Compound Colors)
- Über Herbarts Lehre von intelligiblem Raume. Berlin : Leonhard Simion, 1914. (On Herbart's Theory of Intelligible Spaces)
- Über das Becken, den Schultergürtel und einige andere Teile der Londoner Archaeopteryx. Genf : George, 1921. (On the Pelvis, the Shoulder Girdle and Some Other Parts of the London Archaeopteryx)

Works by Petronijević in French:

- L'évolution universelle. Exposé des preuves et des lois de l`évolution mondiale et des évolutions particulières (inorganique, organique, intellectuelle et sociale). Paris : F. Alcan, 1921. (Universal Evolution. Presentation of the Evidence and Laws of Global Evolution and Particular Developments (Inorganic, Organic, Intellectual and Social))
- Sur la valeur de la vie. Paris : F. Alcan, 1925. (On the Value of Life)
- Résumé des travaux philosophiques et scientifiques de Branislav Petroniević. Academie Royal Serbe, Bulletin de l'Academie des Lettres, No. 2. Belgrade, 1937.

Works by Petronijević in Serbian on Schopenhauer, Nietzsche, Spinoza, Leibniz, Spencer, and Hegel:

- Спиритизам. Београд, 1900. стр. 74
- Фридрих Ниче. Н. Сад, 1902. стр. 99
- О слободи воље, моралној и кривичној одговорности. Београд, 1906. стр. 178+1
- Едуард Хартман. Живот и филозофија. Београд, 1907. стр. 43
- Филозофија у „Горском Вијенцу“ Н. Сад, 1908. стр. 60
- Основи емпириске психологије. Београд, 1910. стр. 318
- Чланци и студије. Књ. -{I-III}-. Београд, 1913-22.
- Шопенхауер, Ниче и Спенсер. Београд, 1922. стр. 316
- Историја новије филозофије. -{I}- део од Ренесансе до Канта. Београд, 1922. стр. 389
- Основи емпириске психологије. -{II}- изд. Књ. -{I-III}-. Београд, 1923-6. стр. 12+172
- Основи теорије сазнања са 19 сл. у тексту. Београд, 1923. стр. 187
- Хегел и Хартман. Београд, 1924. стр. 151
- Чланци и студије. Нова серија. Београд, 1932. стр. 1932
- Принципи метафизике - I, II, Београд, 1998.

== See also ==
- Milan Kujundžić Aberdar
- Božidar Knežević
