= Ila Wingen =

German artist and curator

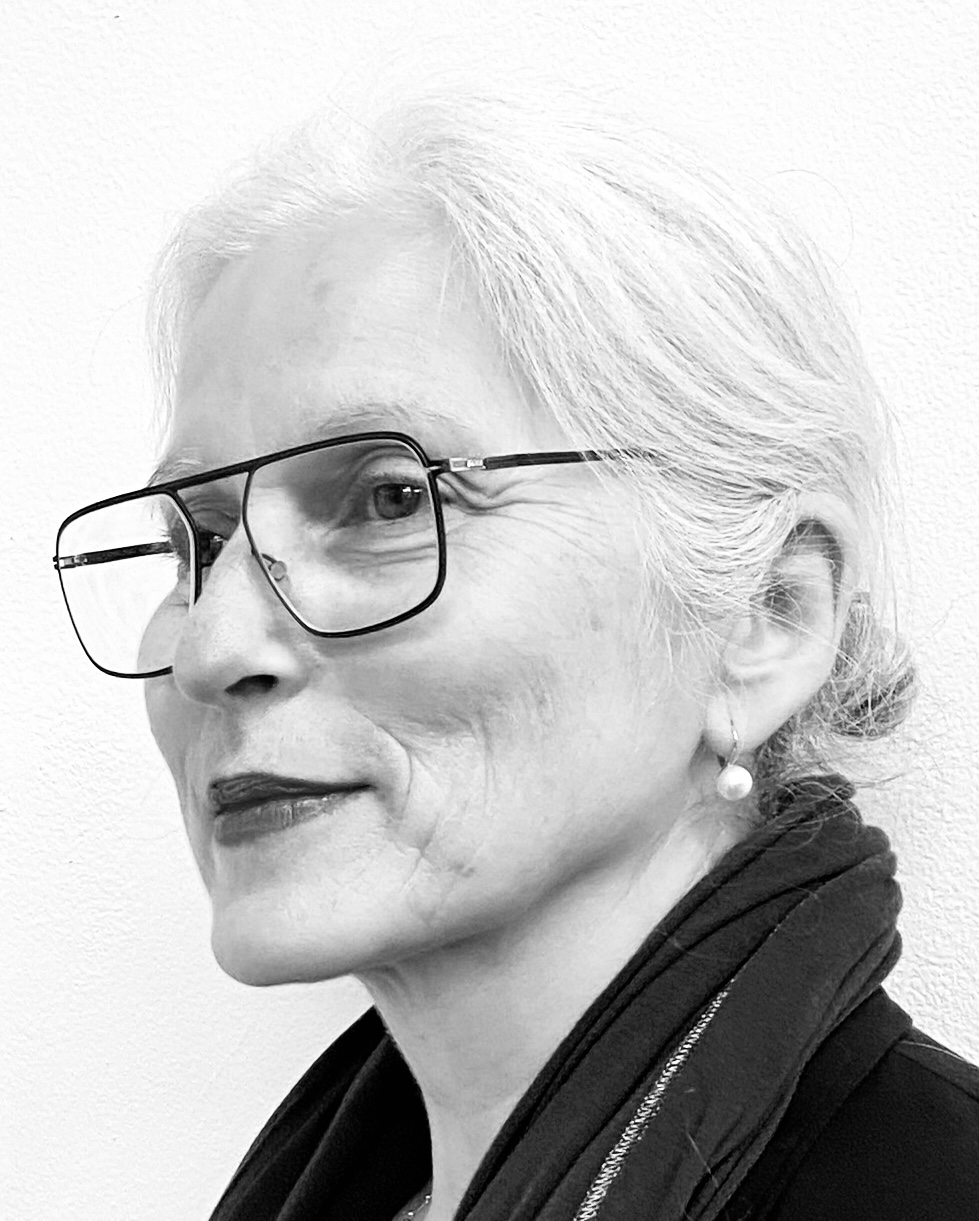
Ila Wingen

Ila Wingen is a German artist and curator known for painting, installations, collages, poetry, and interventions in space. Her work sits at the intersection of art and transformative practices as she continues to work with artists, curators and cultural practitioners all over the world. She was listed among the top 100 artists worldwide by Art.facts. She has participated in projects in Europe, Asia, South America, Africa and the United States.

== Early life and career ==
Wingen was born in Hamburg in 1961. She studied dance at the University of Paris and later studied art plastique at the Université Paris 1 Panthéon-Sorbonne under the recommendation of the artist Nam June Paik. She undertook curatorial studies at the Universität der Künste Berlin in 1984 and assisted the artist Cy Twombly.

== Selected exhibitions ==
- 2026 Faces and Masks: The Interwooven Relation, National Museums of Kenya, Nairobi Gallery
- 2026 Wanderings / Gemächlich umherstreifen, Kim Si-seup Memorial Hall (Gangneung, South Korea)
- 2026 Reich an Zeichen, GalerieETAGE im Museum Reinickendorf (Berlin)
- 2025 The New-You-We-Me, Verein Berliner Künstler (Berlin) — Also served as co-curator; part of EMOP Berlin
- 2025 TrotzTdem, Brandenburgische Frauenwochen (Brandenburg)
- 2023 Wall of Sound, LAGE EGAL Curatorial Projects (Berlin)
- 2022 – Wildwuchs, Villa Blunk, Wriezen; Druckkunst im Dialog, VBK gallery, Berlin; Sag mir, Sangsangheon gallery, Seoul
- 2021 – Der neue Turm, Museum Bad Hersfeld; Kunst bleibt, Rathenauhallen G59, Berlin; Direkte Aktion, Michaela Helfrich gallery, Berlin
