= Human rights in Vanuatu =

The Republic of Vanuatu is a parliamentary democracy with a population of approximately 326.000. The Constitution of Vanuatu is the supreme law and sets out the legal framework which deals with the respect of human rights.

Generally, the Government respects the human rights of its citizens. However, a number of issues have arisen relating to the rights of women, conditions in prisons, government corruption and access to education. In 2009 the UN Human Rights Council (UNHRC) carried out Vanuatu's Universal Periodic Review (UPR). The review identified a number of the above concerns and made recommendations to Vanuatu as on how to address its human rights issues.

== International treaties ==
In 1980 Vanuatu became a member of the United Nations, the same year that independence was gained. Vanuatu has ratified five of the nine core human rights treaties, including the Convention on the Elimination of All Forms of Discrimination Against Women (CEDAW), the Convention on the Rights of Persons with Disabilities (CRPD), Convention on the Rights of the Child (CRC), the International Covenant on Civil and Political Rights (ICCPR) and the Convention Against Torture (CAT). Vanuatu has also ratified a number of International Labour Organization (ILO) conventions that aim to protect and uphold the rights of its workers. Vanuatu has also ratified the Optional Protocol to the Convention on the Rights of the Child on the involvement of children in armed conflict, the Optional Protocol to the Convention on the Rights of the Child on the sale of children, child prostitution and child pornography, and the Optional Protocol to CEDAW.

== Women's rights ==
There are a number of human rights issues relating to women. Domestic violence is a concern, although there is a lack of current statistical information. The NGO coalition reported that assault ranked as the main form of physical violence between 1988 and 2002 and according to the Office of the Public Prosecutor, in 2002, men were responsible for 62% of unlawful assaults on women. The Vanuatu Women's Centre since its establishment in 1992 in Port Vila has dealt with 2,954 cases of domestic violence. Domestic violence is not well reported to the police, particularly in rural areas due to cultural norms, stereotyping, prejudices and lack of access to town centres and health facilities.

At law women have equal rights, however, Vanuatu's traditional culture can at times conflict with this. The concept of the bride price in which a groom or his family gives money to the bride's family in exchange for her hand in marriage is an example of this conflict. Despite the revocation of the 800,000 minimum vatu bride price, the practice is still widespread and effectively puts a commercial value on women and has been seen as a justification for violence against women.

Women also face discrimination in relation to land ownership. Although land ownership is not barred by law, tradition has been a preventative of this. In 2009, it was reported that women-owned 28% of the total leases in Vanuatu.

In 2009 Vanuatu accepted the recommendations set out in its Universal Periodic Review in relation to human rights issues regarding women. The recommendations advocated for Vanuatu to continue to incorporate principles of CEDAW as well as the other human rights conventions that it is party to into its domestic legislation and to undertake further actions to combat discrimination, and to ensure equality for women.

=== Domestic violence ===
Vanuatu has progressed in protecting women's rights by passing the 2008 Family Protection Act (FPA). The purpose of the act is to "provide for an offence of domestic violence and family protection orders in cases of domestic violence." Under the act, violators face five years imprisonment and/or a fine of up to 100,000 vatu. The Government established a ‘Family Protection Unit’ to deal with issues related to the FPA. A protection order allows police to issue an order where a threat of violence has occurred, proof of injury is not a requirement.

Police are also undergoing specialized training to deal with cases of domestic and sexual violence and have implemented a no-drop policy in which they do not drop cases of domestic violence, if the victim wishes for the complaint to be withdrawn they must go to court and formally make a request. Women's groups such as the Vanuatu Women's Centre and NGOs are also heavily involved in promoting and protecting the rights of women in Vanuatu.

== Prison conditions ==
There have been ongoing issues relating to the prison and detention center conditions in Vanuatu at the two prisons that are currently in operation in Port Vila and Luganville. There have been increases in prison numbers resulting in overcrowding and poor security led to a number of escapes. In 2006 the Government released 52 prisoners citing poor sanitation and overcrowding as the reason for release.

In December 2008, detainees published a detailed report on the abuse of human rights by Correctional Services Officers and the Police. The report covers a wide range of issues such as "unlawful arrest and unlawful custody, right to life, security of the person, freedom from inhumane treatment, freedom from expression being denied, poor living conditions, poor hygiene, denial of medical care, unlawful use of restraint, denial of visits of relatives and legal counsels and adult and juvenile prisoners sharing the same facilities." Following the report, the Ministry of Justice and Social Welfare appointed a Commission of Inquiry to investigate the allegations in the report.

In 2009 Vanuatu accepted the recommendation under its UPR to take appropriate measures and continue working towards improving conditions in prisons and detention centers. Vanuatu also accepted the recommendation to support further human rights training for police and corrections and promote regular, independent monitoring of detention facilities and ensure that detainees have immediate and effective means of redress and protection when their rights are violated. Vanuatu also accepted the recommendation to ensure a timely and thorough investigation into the allegations in the detainee report and initiate reform of corrections where necessary.

== Government corruption ==
There have been some ongoing issues in relation to government corruption in Vanuatu. The office of the Ombudsman and the Auditor General are the key government agencies responsible for combating governmental corruption. The major causes of governmental corruption in Vanuatu are classified in two ways. The first classification, economic causes, where a governmental officer may use the Government assets allocated to him for personal gain. Secondly, political causes, is where once appointed in a ministry a leader may use his power to appoint people from his party to a particular post.

The Vanuatu government has introduced mechanisms in order to address these corruption issues. The Leadership Code Act 1998 (the code) forbids a leader from using public money for personal gain, from accepting any loan which he might have an advantage or other benefit or from bribing a person. Under the code, a person is also forbidden to hold any public office or position for which he or she receives a salary if that office or positions conflicts or interferes in any way with the ability of a leader to fulfill his or her duties. The code also sets out the Ombudsman's role in investigating and prosecuting leaders who have been found to be in breach of the code.

Since its establishment, the Ombudsman has issued a number of reports that have been critical of government institutions and officials. There have been concerns over some reports of the Ombudsman not ending up in court. This is mainly due to the law and Court Rules dealing with evidence, which oblige the Public Prosecutor to request further investigation in relation to the report of the Ombudsman if they are not satisfied they have received sufficient evidence. This has placed limits on their ability to prosecute, as by 2009 only one case has occurred where the Public Prosecutor has successfully prosecuted a leader following a report from the Ombudsman. In relation to the limitations on holding the government to account for corruption, no law provides for public access to government information, and the media's request for information has been met with an inconsistent response from the government.

In 2009 Vanuatu accepted the recommendations from its Universal Periodic Review which advocated for Vanuatu to continue strengthening the role of the Ombudsman's office, including its ability to follow up on the results of its investigations and namely to increase efforts to provide it with sufficient funding and allocate more funding to the Ombudsman to allow for more aggressive prosecution of corruption cases.

== Education ==
There are some significant issues in relation to education in Vanuatu. While the Government has stressed the importance of children's rights and welfare and in 2010 implemented the policy of free and universal education for children 1-8, school attendance is not compulsory. There is a discrepancy between girls and boys, although the attendance rates are similar at primary school fewer girls advanced to the higher grades and a significant portion of the population, up to 50 percent is illiterate.

There are also concerns in relation to the educational needs of children with disabilities and their ability to access facilities. In the 2009 Universal Periodic Review of Vanuatu, the delegations recommended that Vanuatu promote awareness-raising programmes on the importance of the education of children, which Vanuatu accepted. Vanuatu did not accept the recommendation of considering applying adequate sanctions for parents who fail to send their children to school.

== See also ==
- LGBT rights in Vanuatu
