= Anne Pakoa =

Ni-Vanuatu human rights activist (born 1969)

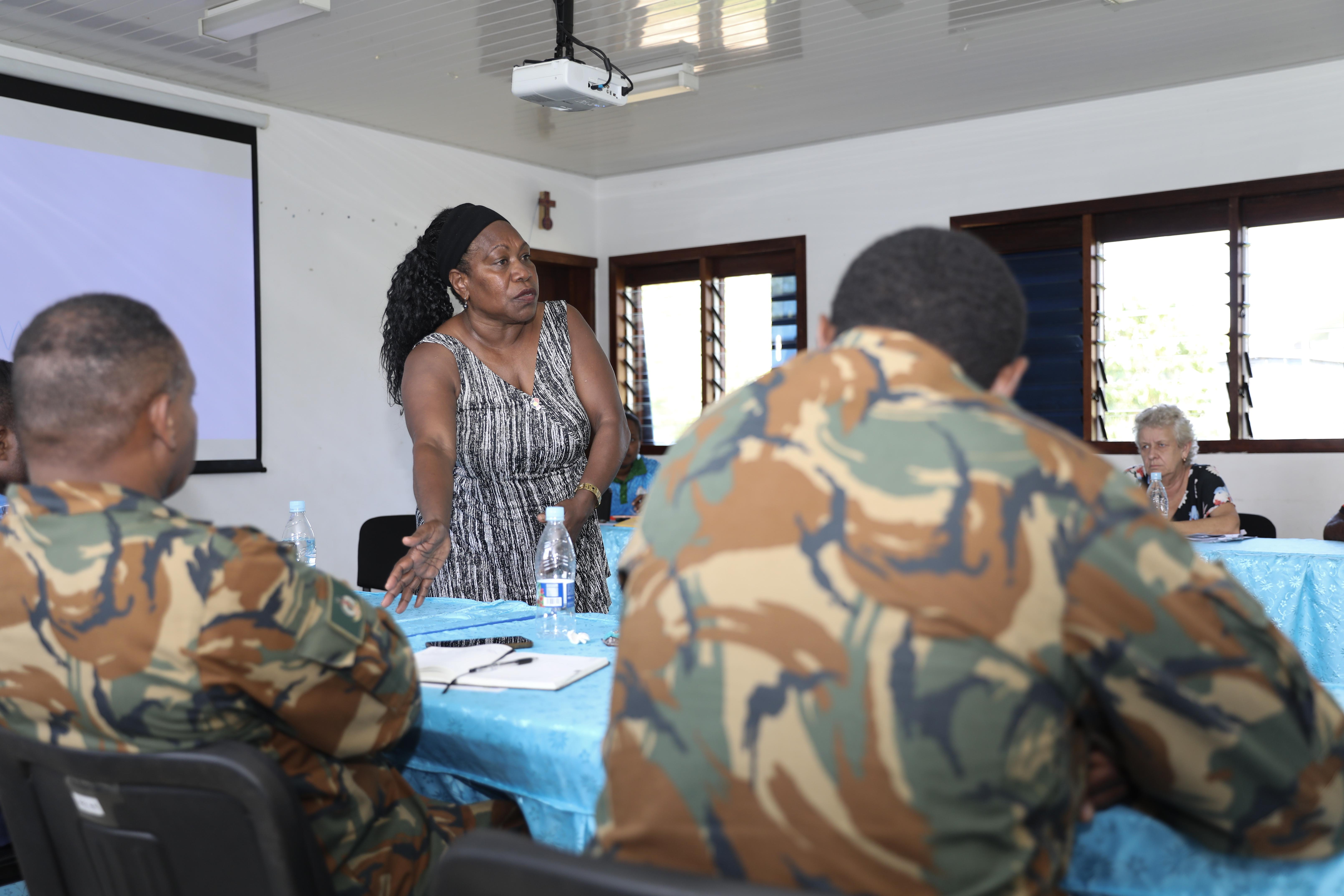
- Training members of the Vanuatu Mobile Forces in 2024
- Born: 12 April 1969 (age 57); Tongoa, Vanuatu
- Occupation: Activist

Anne Leimala Pakoa Pailthorpe (born 12 April 1969) is a Ni-Vanuatu human rights activist. The founder of the Vanuatu Human Rights Coalition, she is known for her advocacy for women in the Pacific, particularly in the context of climate change.

== Biography ==
Pakoa is from the island of Tongoa in Shefa Province, Vanuatu. She studied nursing at university and has a postgraduate degree in education policy analysis. Pakoa received a scholarship through the Australia Awards. In 2008, she founded Anne's Christian Community Health School and Nursing Services, which provided healthcare to communities in Vanuatu that struggle to access medical treatment; a key scheme of the ACCHSNS has included providing contraception to women in rural areas.

Pakoa is the CEO of the Vatu Mauri Consortium, which connects women and girls in rural communities with women in urban areas like Port Vila and Luganville, to support the latter to grow "climate-smart" gardens to improve food security in light of climate change and natural disasters.

Pakoa is the founder and secretary of the Vanuatu Human Rights Coalition, which aims to promote and protect human rights in Vanuatu, particularly for minority groups, and campaigns for a more equitable society, including calling for gender equality. The VHRC is based in Port Vila.

In addition, Pakoa is a technical advisor for Vanuatu Young Women for Change, the in-country partner of Action Aid Australia, which raises awareness of social issues effecting young women. Through the VYWC, Pakoa has delivered the Women i Tok Tok Tugeta programme (lit. 'women talk together'), which trains Ni-Vanuatu women to prepare and respond to crises and disasters, including those caused by climate change.

Pakoa also takes part in national, regional, and international committees, including the National Human Rights Committee, SHEFA Education Board, the Pacific Human Rights Defenders Network, the Pacific Greens Women Network, the Commonwealth 8.7 Network, Climate Justice Fund, Urgent Action Fund for Women, Global South Dignified Menstruation, and the Niu Pacific Green Network. Pakoa is the vice chair of the African-Caribbean-Pacific Non-State Actors Network steering group.

In 2024, Pakoa publicly supported 11 Ni-Vanuatu seasonal workers in Australia who sued Perfection Fresh for sexual harassment and urged authorities in Vanuatu to do the same. She has urged the government of Vanuatu, as well as other Pacific countries, to recognise that violence against women is "everyone's business".

In May 2025, Pakoa criticised amendments to the Constitution of Vanuatu which defined there as being two genders, male and female. She described the amendments as "childish" and stated that they contravened the United Nations Convention on the Rights of the Child, of which Vanuatu was a party. She had previously urged the government to conduct a sufficient consultation with affected groups, including the LGBTQ community. A government spokesperson stated that a consultation was not necessary, while the Prime Minister of Vanuatu, Jotham Napat, stated that Vanuatu would continue to uphold "Christian values".

In August 2026, Pakoa called on the Ni-Vanuatu government to enforce stronger punishments of people convicted of rape, including chemical castration of people found guilty of raping children. In October, she spoke out against calls to publicly identify people in Shefa Province who were diagnosed with HIV following an increase in cases, stating they were protected under the Public Health Act.
