= Goran Švob =

Croatian philosopher (1947–2013)

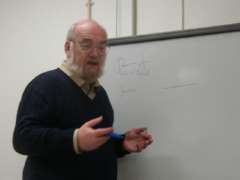
- Švob while lecturing in 2008
- Born: 29 May 1947; Zagreb, SR Croatia, SFR Yugoslavia
- Died: 18 April 2013 (aged 65)

Philosophical work
- Era: 20th-century philosophy and contemporary philosophy
- Region: Western philosophy
- School: Analytic philosophy
- Main interests: Logic; philosophy of language; ordinary language philosophy; logical positivism
- Website: www-wpt.ffzg.hr/filoz/nastavnici/goran-svob

Goran Švob (pronounced [ɡoran ʃʋob]; 29 May 1947 – 18 April 2013) was a Croatian philosopher, logician, and author. He was an associate professor at the Department of Philosophy of Faculty of Humanities and Social Sciences, University of Zagreb where he taught logic and the philosophy of language, being employed there since 1975.

Švob has written two books and published numerous scientific papers in the academic field of logic. He was greatly influenced by the analytic philosophy and particularly by the philosophers Gottlob Frege, Bertrand Russell, and Ludwig Wittgenstein.

== Education and academic career ==
Švob was born on 29 May 1947 in Zagreb, then part of Yugoslavia. There he finished his primary school education and graduated from gymnasium. He then enrolled at the Faculty of Humanities and Social Sciences of the University of Zagreb where he got his Master of Arts in philosophy and English language in 1971. The same year he managed to get employed at the Department of Philosophy of the same faculty.

During the academic year 1973–1974 Švob spent six months as a research fellow at the University of Oxford. He also had shorter visits at the universities in Austria, West Germany, Great Britain, Japan, and China. In 1988, he got his Doctor of Philosophy in philosophy at the Faculty of Humanities and Social Sciences, and the following year he was selected to the position of an assistant professor, and was further promoted to the position of associate professor in 2001. He has been teaching logic and philosophy of language there since 1975. He was also a guest lecturer at the University of Vienna, LMU Munich, Peking University, Hokkaido University, University of Tokyo, and Kyoto University.

Švob was the leader of scientific research project Logic, Universal Language and the Philosophy of Language (Croatian: Logika, univerzalni jezik i filozofija jezika) of the Ministry of Science, Education and Sports of the Republic of Croatia.

== Published work ==
Švob published scientific papers in leading philosophical journals, in particular the journal of Praxis School, Filozofska istraživanja, SOL, and, most notably, Acta Analytica. His first book, titled Frege: Pojmovno pismo (English: Frege: Conceptual Notation), was published in 1992.

Od slike do igre (English: From Image to Game) was a second book written by Švob, published in 2009. The book is consolidated of articles which differ by subject and time when they were written, though they all mainly focus on the work of three philosophers: Gottlob Frege, Bertrand Russell, and Ludwig Wittgenstein. The focal point of the book, however, is the shift in Wittgenstein's philosophy of language, or the transition from the early to late Wittgenstein.

== Bibliography ==
Books

- Frege: Pojmovno pismo Zagreb: Biblioteka SOL, Faculty of Humanities and Social Sciences, and Naprijed. 1992.
- Od slike do igre. Zagreb: ArTresor. 2009. ISBN 953-6522-63-2

Selected scientific papers

- O nekim pretpostavkama logike. Published in Praxis #3–4 (1972), pp. 555–561.
- O tvrdnji i znaku asercije. Published in Praxis #3–5 (1974), pp. 357–375.
- Ima li danas logičkih antinomija?. Published in Filozofska istraživanja #3 (1985), pp. 527–541.
- Fregeova koncepcija logike. Published in SOL #7 (1989), pp. 5–26.
- Is Identity a Relation?. Published in Angewandte Ethik, Akten des 21. Internationalen Wittgenstein-Symposiums (1999), pp. 51–59.
- The Heritage of Frege’s Begriffsschrift. Published in Acta Analytica #25 (2000), pp. 61–82.
