= Practice =

Practice or practise may refer to:

== Education and learning ==
- Practice (learning method), a method of learning by repetition
- Phantom practice, phenomenon in which a person's abilities continue to improve, even without practicing
- Practice-based professional learning

== Medical and pharmacy ==
- Medical practice, providing healthcare

== Law ==
- Legal practice
- Practice of law

== Art, media, and entertainment ==
- Practice chanter, a musical instrument used to practice the Great Highland bagpipes
- The Practice, a television series about a legal practice

== Other ==
- Best practice
- Practice theory, a family of theories in sociology
- Spiritual practice
- Standards and Practices, a conventional, traditional, or otherwise standardised method

== See also ==
- The Practice (disambiguation)
- Praxis (disambiguation)
