= LGBTQ rights in Vanuatu =

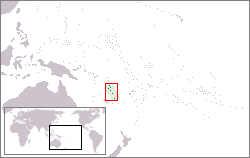
- Vanuatu
- Legal status: Legal, age of consent equalised in 2007
- Gender identity: No
- Military: No standing army
- Discrimination protections: Some employment protections for sexual orientation

Family rights
- Recognition of relationships: No, banned since 2024
- Adoption: No

Lesbian, gay, bisexual, transgender, and queer (LGBTQ) persons in Vanuatu may face legal challenges not experienced by non-LGBTQ residents. Same-sex sexual activity is legal, but households headed by same-sex couples are not eligible for the same legal protections available to opposite-sex married couples. In November 2024, legislative action certified a ban on any religious, civil and traditional marriages between two people of the same sex.

In 2011, Vanuatu signed the "joint statement on ending acts of violence and related human rights violations based on sexual orientation and gender identity" at the United Nations, condemning violence and discrimination against LGBTQ people.

VPride Foundation is a Ni-Vanuatu human rights group that advocates for LGBTQ rights, freedom of speech and freedom of religion. The group, established in 2009, has organised many events to raise awareness of LGBTQ people in Vanuatu. Some of these events have been attended by government officials.

== Law regarding same-sex sexual activity ==
Same-sex sexual activity is legal in Vanuatu. Since the Penal Code (Amendment) Act 2006 commenced in 2007, the age of consensual sex in Vanuatu has been 15 years regardless of sex or sexual orientation.

== Recognition of same-sex relationships ==
Vanuatu does not recognise same-sex unions in any form.

In October 2013, the Minister for Internal Affairs issued a warning which said that pastors are not allowed to preside over same-sex marriages.

In June 2014, the Vanuatu Law Commission discussed the issue of same-sex marriage, noting developments in neighbouring Australia and especially New Zealand. The Commission noted that the Marriage Act (Cap 60) (French: Loi sur le mariage (chap. 60); Bislama: Mared Akt (Japta 60)) does not in its current form prohibit the recognition of same-sex marriages (neither does it expressly permit them). It also stated that legalizing same-sex marriage would allow LGBTQ people to "fulfil their sexual preference or sexual orientation without repression or fear of being prosecuted", but found that religious opposition to legalization would be high.

In November 2024, legislative action certified a ban on same-sex marriage - regardless of religious, civil or traditional type marriages.

== Discrimination protections ==
There is no legal protection against all forms of discrimination based on sexual orientation or gender identity.

There is no general prohibition of employment discrimination based on sexual orientation in Vanuatu. However, Section 18.2(f) of the Teaching Service Act 2013 (French: Loi de 2013 sur les services d'enseignements) establishes the obligation of the Vanuatu Teaching Service Commission not to discriminate in recruitment, promotion, professional development, transfer and all other aspects of the management of its employees on the basis of "sexual preference".

The Right to Information Act 2016 (French: Loi de 2016 sur le droit à l'information; Bislama: Raet blong Information Akt blong 2016) gives Vanuatu citizens the right to access government-held documents, including documents held by ministries and government departments, statutory and regulatory bodies, public hospitals, local government councils, and any organizations providing public service and receiving government funds. Certain types of documents not available to the public include those containing "personal information", which is defined by the Act as "[...] information relating to the race, gender, sex, marital status, national, ethnic or social origin, colour, sexual orientation, age, physical or mental health, well-being, disability, religion, conscience, belief, culture, language and birth of the person; [...]".

Section 2(2)(j) of the Harmful Digital Communications Act 2024 states that a digital communication must not denigrate an individual by reason of his or her colour, race, ethnic, island or national origins, political affiliation, religion, gender, sexual orientation, or disability.

=== Public Prosecutor protections ===
There are some protections based on sexual orientation and sexual preference issued by The Office of the Public Prosecutor:

- The Prosecution Policy 2003, states: "The Public Prosecutor may not let his personal views of the ethnic or national origin, gender, religious beliefs, political views or sexual preference of an offender, victim or witness influence his decisions."
- The Prosecutors Code (Gazette no. 13 of 2017) states: "Prosecutors must also have regard to whether the offence was motivated by any form of discrimination against the victim’s ethnic or national origin, gender, disability, age, religion or belief, sexual orientation or gender identity; or the suspect demonstrated hostility towards the victim based on any of those characteristics. The presence of any such motivation or hostility will mean that it is more likely that prosecution is required. In deciding whether a prosecution is required in the public interest, prosecutors should take into account the views expressed by the victim about the impact that the offence has had. In appropriate cases, this may also include the views of the victim’s family."
- The General Principles for obtaining the best evidence from vulnerable witnesses to Sexual and Gender-Based Violence offences, states: "Vulnerable witnesses should not be discriminated against, irrespective of their race, colour, religion, beliefs, age, family status, culture, language, ethnicity, national or social origin, citizenship, gender, sexual orientation, political or other opinions, disability, status of birth, property or other condition. Professionals working in or with the criminal justice sector should be aware of individual differences that can impact a person’s ability to fully participate in the criminal justice process."

== Social conditions ==
Vanuatu is a socially conservative country. Gay and lesbian travellers (and citizens) are advised to avoid public displays of affection. There is no active gay scene in Vanuatu.

The International Day Against Homophobia, Transphobia and Biphobia was first celebrated in Vanuatu in 2016. The event was organised by VPride Foundation. In October 2016, the group, in correlation with other human rights groups including Vanuatu Women's Centre, held a workshop on LGBTQ rights and women's rights. The Minister of Health attended the event, and discussed issues such as better access to healthcare for people living with HIV/AIDS.

== Summary table ==
Same-sex sexual activity legal	Yes (Since 2007)
Equal age of consent (15)	Yes (Since 2007)
Anti-discrimination laws in employment only	Yes / No (Since 2013; some protections)
Anti-discrimination laws in the provision of goods and services	No
Anti-discrimination laws in all other areas (Incl. indirect discrimination, hate speech)	No
Same-sex marriages	No (Certified ban since 2024)
Recognition of same-sex couples	No
Stepchild adoption by same-sex couples	No
Joint adoption by same-sex couples	No
LGBTQ people allowed to serve openly in the military	No standing army
Right to change legal gender	No
Access to IVF for lesbians	No
Commercial surrogacy for gay male couples	No
MSMs allowed to donate blood	No

== See also ==
- Human rights in Vanuatu
- LGBT rights in Oceania
