= Praxis Discussion Series =

Australian televised discussion series

- Created by: Aleta Moriarty; Barbara Ratusznik
- Presented by: Auskar Surbakti
- Country of origin: Australia

Production
- Producer: Laura Keenan
- Running time: 60 minutes
- Production company: Flicks Australia

The Praxis Discussion Series was established by the World Bank office in Sydney, Australia in order to provide a forum to discuss ideas, approaches, initiatives and policy pertinent to international development. Launched in January 2009 in partnership with Australian public affairs television channel A-PAC, the series aims to stimulate debate and promote the exchange of ideas. A one-hour panel-style program, the show is recorded throughout the year at the World Bank office.

Each session features three specialists on a select topic relating to international development. To coincide with the World Bank's work in the Pacific region, a World Bank representative is usually a part of the panel, joined by two other guest speakers providing different perspectives on the issue at hand.

Recognising a gap in the development conversation, Praxis opened its doors to one and all, allowing the general public to sit alongside representatives from Australian government departments, civil society and non-government organisations, and the private sector, as well as various academics and students, in order to tackle development issues from a variety of perspectives. With the deadline for achieving the Millennium Development Goals coming up in 2015, such discussions are becoming increasingly important. Interactivity is valued above all else, and every audience member has the opportunity to have their say and question the views of the panelists.

Discussions are also broadcast in Fiji, Samoa, Tonga and Papua New Guinea, while the World Bank's YouTube channel provides content online. Further, the involvement of the Global Development Learning Network (GDLN) has meant that audiences in Timor-Leste, Solomon Islands and Papua New Guinea have been able to take part in discussions via video conference.

== Past Discussions ==
2014
Topic	Date	Speakers
Women's Economic Empowerment	June	Amy Luinstra, Senior Gender Specialist, International Finance Corporation; Joanne Crawford, Research and Policy Adviser, International Women's Development Agency (IWDA) and; Amanda Donigi, Founder of Stella Magazine in Papua New Guinea.
Labour Mobility in the Pacific	May	Mai Malaulau, Labour Migration Specialist, World Bank; Luke Craven, University of Sydney and Ms. Kanasa, Ikale Contractors, an Australian employment company for the Australian Seasonal Worker Program.
Poverty and Hardship in the Pacific	March	Rex Horoi, Executive Director for the Foundation of the Peoples of the South Pacific International (FSPI); David Abbott, Economic Development Specialist; Truman Packard, Lead Economist, Human Development Sector, World Bank
Early Childhood Care and Education	January	Raelyn Lolohea 'Esau, Deputy Director, Ministry of Education and Training in Tonga; Dr Sally Brinkman, Telethon Institute for Child Health Research; Mary-Ruth Mendel, Co-founder and Chairman of the Australian Literacy and Numeracy Foundation; Myrna Machuca-Sierra, Education Specialist, World Bank

2013
Topic	Date	Speakers
Extractive Industries	February	Michael Nest, Governance Specialist; Vivek Suri, World Bank; Colin Filer, Australian National University
Aid in a Changing World	March	Axel van Trotsenburg, World Bank; Dr Jimmie Rodgers, Secretariat of the Pacific Community; Margaret Reid OAM
Climate Change	April	Rachel Kyte, World Bank; Kevin Hennessy, CSIRO; the Hon. Tessie Lambourne, Government of Kiribati
Communications and Technology for Development	Friday 14 June	Gerard McCarthy from TechChange; Sarah Logan, Australian National University; Michael Bergmann, AusAID.
Conflict and Transitions	Friday 5 July	Tarcisius Kabutaulaka, University of Hawai’i; Joseph Foukona, Australian National University; Rebecca Bryant, AusAID; Professor Anthony Zwi, University of NSW.
Maternal and Reproductive Health	Friday 9 August	Dr Samson Baba, Ministry of Health, Republic of South Sudan, The Hon Dr Meredith Burgmann, President of Australian Council for International Development (ACFID) and Michele Rumsey, World Health Organization Collaborating Centre for Nursing, Midwifery and Health Development, UTS.
Youth Employment	Friday 4 October	Stephen Close, World Bank, Richard Curtain, Public Policy Consultant, and Dr Jioji Ravulo, University of Western Sydney.
Inequality	Thursday 14 November	Lars Osberg, Dalhousie University, Canada; Michelle Rooney, ANU; Virginia Horscroft, World Bank; and Sameer Dossani, ActionAid.

2012
Topic	Date	Speakers
Aid Effectiveness	Thursday 4 April	Matt Morris, the Development Policy Centre at the Australian National University; Truman Packard, World Bank; Michael Carnahan, AusAID
Oceans and Fisheries	Friday 4 May	Michael Harte, World Wildlife Fund; Charles Feinstein, World Bank; Kate Barclay, University of Technology Sydney
Education in a Changing World	Monday 16 July	Yidan Wang, World Bank; Bernie Lovegrove, ASPBAE Australia; Jack Maebuta, Australian National University
Pacific Futures	Friday 10 August	Ralph Regenvanu, Member of Parliament in Vanuatu; Ferid Belhaj, World Bank; Rob Tranter, AusAID; Professor Biman Prasad, University of the South Pacific
Urbanisation	Friday 12 October	Max Kep, Papua New Guinea's Office of Urbanisation; Professor John Connell University of Sydney; Truman Packard, World Bank; Simon Cramp, AusAID
Violence against Women	Wednesday 24 October	Libby Lloyd AM; Merilyn Tahi, Vanuatu Women's Centre; Zoë Mander-Jones, AusAID; Carol Angir, Action Aid Australia
Non-Communicable Diseases	Monday 17 December	Dr Jimmie Rodgers, Secretariat of the Pacific Community; Ian Anderson, Ian Anderson Economics; Dr Temo Waqanivalu, World Health Organization

2011
Topic	Date	Speakers
Development in the Pacific	Thursday 24 March	Rob Jauncey, World Bank; Caleb Jarvis, Pacific Trade & Invest; Daniel Rowland, University of Sydney Law School
Maternal and Child Health	Friday 6 May	Dr. Nicole Wong Doo, Royal Prince Alfred Hospital; Mahboba Rawi OAM, Mahboba's Promise; Dr. Nesrin Varol, University of Sydney
Food and Agriculture	Wednesday 8 June	'Alopi Latukefu, AusAID; Jon Edwards, Action Aid Australia; Bill Pritchard, University of Sydney
Development and the Private Sector	Friday 8 July	David Shearer, Australian Centre for International Agricultural Research; Eugenue Zhukov, Asian Development Bank; Gavin Murray, International Finance Corporation
Law and Justice	Thursday 1 September	Ferid Belhaj, World Bank; Veronica L. Taylor, Australian National University; Ali Tuhanuku, Consultant with Solomon Islands' Ministry of Justice and Legal Affairs
Gender Equality and Development	Thursday 6 October	Gillian Brown, AusAID; Lulu Mitshabu, Caritas Australia and Julie McKay, UN Women Australia
Poverty and Livelihoods	Thursday 10 November	Michal Rutkowski, World Bank; Patrick Vakaoti, Australian National University; Bharath Mohan, Care Australia; Virginia Horscroft, World Bank

2010
Topic	Date	Speakers
Natural Disasters	Tuesday 27 April	Chris Bennett, World Bank; Jon Burrough, AusAID; Amalia Fawcett, Plan International Australia
Microfinance	Thursday 27 May	Guy Winship, World Education Australia; Terry Reid, Asian Development Bank; John Conroy, Foundation for Development Cooperation
Women and Development	Thursday 17 June	Elizabeth Reid, development consultant; Gillian Brown, AusAID; Andrew Rowell, CARE Australia; and Robert Dunn, Opportunity International Australia
Food Security	Thursday 22 July	Archie Law, ActionAid Australia; Nick Austin, Australian Centre for International Agricultural Research; Denis Blight, Crawford Fund
HIV and AIDS	Tuesday 24 August	Rouena Getigan, ChildFund Australia; Bruce Parnell, Burnet Institute; Bill Bowtell, Lowy Institute
Climate Change	Wednesday 22 September	Norman Gillespie, UNICEF Australia; Emilia (Milina) Battaglini, World Bank; Martijn Wilder, Baker & McKenzie
Poverty and the Global Financial Crisis	Wednesday 20 October	James Cox, World Vision Australia; Ross Buckley, University of NSW; Mark Thirlwell, Lowy Institute
Intervening in Conflict Settings	Thursday 9 December	Terence Wesley-Smith and Tarcisius Kabutaulaka, University of Hawaii; Anne Brown, University of Queensland

2009
Topic	Date	Speakers
Migration and Remittances	Wednesday 21 January	Manjula Luthria, World Bank; Nic Maclellan, Freelance journalist and researcher; Edward (Ted) Wolfers, University of Wollongong; Mark Getchell, International Organization for Migration
Global Financial Crisis	Friday 20 February	Vikram Nehru, World Bank; Mark Thirlwell, Lowy Institute; Tim Harcourt, Austrade
Climate Change	Monday 23 March	Wanita Limpus, Kiribati Australia Association; Paul Gilding, Independent writer and advisor; Marianne Grosclaude, World Bank
Energy	Tuesday 28 April	Dr. Mark Diesendorf, University of NSW; Jack Whelan, Foundation for Development Cooperation; Tendai Gregan, World Bank
Education	Monday 25 May	Archie Law, ActionAid Australia; Felicity Mitchell, teacher and former Australian Youth Ambassador; Barbra Daufanamae, student from Solomon Islands; Stephen Close, World Bank.
Technology	Monday 29 June	Margaret Duckett, Australian Foundation for the Peoples of Asia and the Pacific; Jonathan Greenacre, Clayton Utz and Step Safe; Greg Tucker, Payment Services Ltd. and Money Mover Systems.
Gender	Monday 20 July	The Hon. Duncan Kerr, Parliamentary Secretary for Pacific Island Affairs; Sarah Marland, Amnesty International; Sonali Bishop, International Finance Corporation (IFC).
Health	Tuesday 25 August	The Hon. Bob McMullan, Parliamentary Secretary for International Development Assistance; Tim Costello, World Vision Australia; Stephen Close, World Bank.
Development in Post-Conflict States	Monday 21 September	Kanthan Shankar, World Bank; Mark McGillivray, AusAID; and Michael Smith, Asia Pacific Civil-Military Centre of Excellence.
Climate Change 2	Monday 26 October	Robert Hill, Australian Carbon Trust and University of Sydney; Brian Dawson, AusAID; and Charles Feinstein, World Bank.
Youth	Monday 16 November	Carolyn Hardy, UNICEF Australia; Joel Kalpram, ni-Vanuatu student; Fabia Shah, AusAID.
