= The Practice (disambiguation) =

The Practice is an American legal drama TV series.

The Practice may also refer to:

- The Practice (1976 TV series), a situation comedy starring Danny Thomas that aired on NBC from 1976 to 1977
- The Practice (1985 TV series), a short-lived British medical drama produced by Granada Television.
- The Practice PLC a company providing primary care in England

== See also ==
- Practice (disambiguation)
