= Cynthia Macdonald (philosopher) =

British philosopher

- Born: August 25, 1951 (age 75)

Academic background
- Education: University of Oxford

Cynthia Macdonald is a British philosopher and academic, and is a full professor at the University of Manchester, specialising in mind-body identity theory, and metaphysics. She is a professor emerita at the University of Canterbury in New Zealand.

== Academic career ==
Macdonald completed BPhil and MPhil degrees at the University of Oxford. Her DPhil thesis, completed in 1984, was titled Events and mind-body identity. Macdonald first lectured at the University of Manchester, before joining the faculty of the University of Canterbury in New Zealand in 1998, where she was appointed full professor. Macdonald was Professor of Philosophy at Queen's University, Belfast from 2005 to 2011. Macdonald then rejoined the faculty of the University of Manchester. She was appointed professor emerita at the University of Canterbury in New Zealand in 2009.

Macdonald's research is on the philosophy of mind, metaphysics and cognitive science. Macdonald received a Marsden grant on the metaphysics of mental causation with Graham Macdonald, also an emeritus professor at Canterbury. Macdonald has also received grants from the National Endowment for the Humanities and the Mind Association. Macdonald was awarded the Belle van Zuylen Distinguished Visiting Professorship at Utrecht University in 1995. She has also been a visiting professor at Rutgers University and Columbia University.

Macdonald is a Consulting Editor for the Swedish journal Theoria, and was on the consulting board of the University of Manchester postgraduate-edited journal Praxis.

== Selected works ==
Authored and edited books

- Macdonald, Cynthia (2005). Varieties of Things: Foundations of Contemporary Metaphysics. Blackwell Publishing. doi:10.1002/9780470775684. ISBN 978-0-470-77568-4. Wikidata Q124613401.
- Cynthia Macdonald (1989). Mind-Body Identity Theories. Routledge, London.
- Cynthia Macdonald; Graham Macdonald. (editors; January 1991). Connectionism: Debates on Psychological Explanation, Volume 2. Wiley-Blackwell. ISBN 978-0-631-19745-4

Journal articles

- Cynthia Macdonald; Graham Macdonald (2008). "Reductionism: Historiography and Psychology". In Aviezer Tucker (ed.). A Companion to the Philosophy of History and Historiography. Blackwell Publishing. doi:10.1002/9781444304916. ISBN 978-1-4051-4908-2. LCCN 2008007601. OCLC 196312410. Wikidata Q133443987.
- Macdonald, Cynthia; Graham Macdonald (26 November 2012), The Epistemology of Meaning 1, Millikan and Her Critics, Wiley-Blackwell, pp. 221–240, doi:10.1002/9781118328118.ch11, Wikidata Q124613389
- Macdonald, Cynthia (2007). "Introspection and Authoritative Self-Knowledge" (PDF). Erkenntnis. 67 (2): 355–372. doi:10.1007/s10670-007-9072-z. Wikidata Q124613394.
- W. Fish; Macdonald, Cynthia (2007). "On McDowell's identity conception of truth". Analysis. 67 (1): 36–41. doi:10.1093/analys/67.1.36. Wikidata Q124613395.
