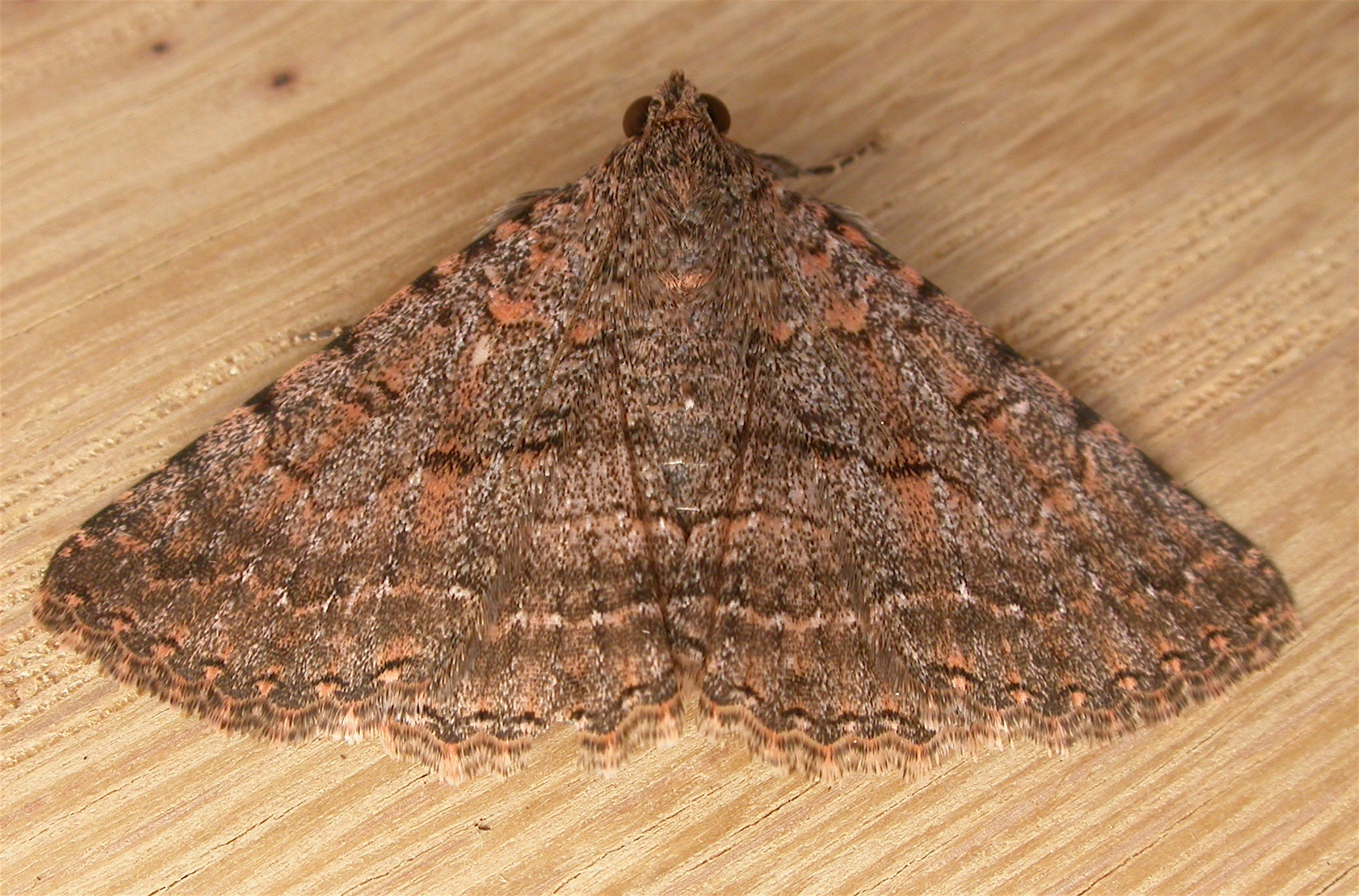

Scientific classification
- Kingdom: Animalia
- Phylum: Arthropoda
- Class: Insecta
- Order: Lepidoptera
- Superfamily: Noctuoidea
- Family: Erebidae
- Genus: Praxis
- Species: P. marmarinopa

Binomial name
- Praxis marmarinopa Meyrick, 1897

= Praxis marmarinopa =

Species of moth

Praxis marmarinopa, the western praxis, is a moth of the family Erebidae. The species was first described by Edward Meyrick in 1897. It is found in Australia.
