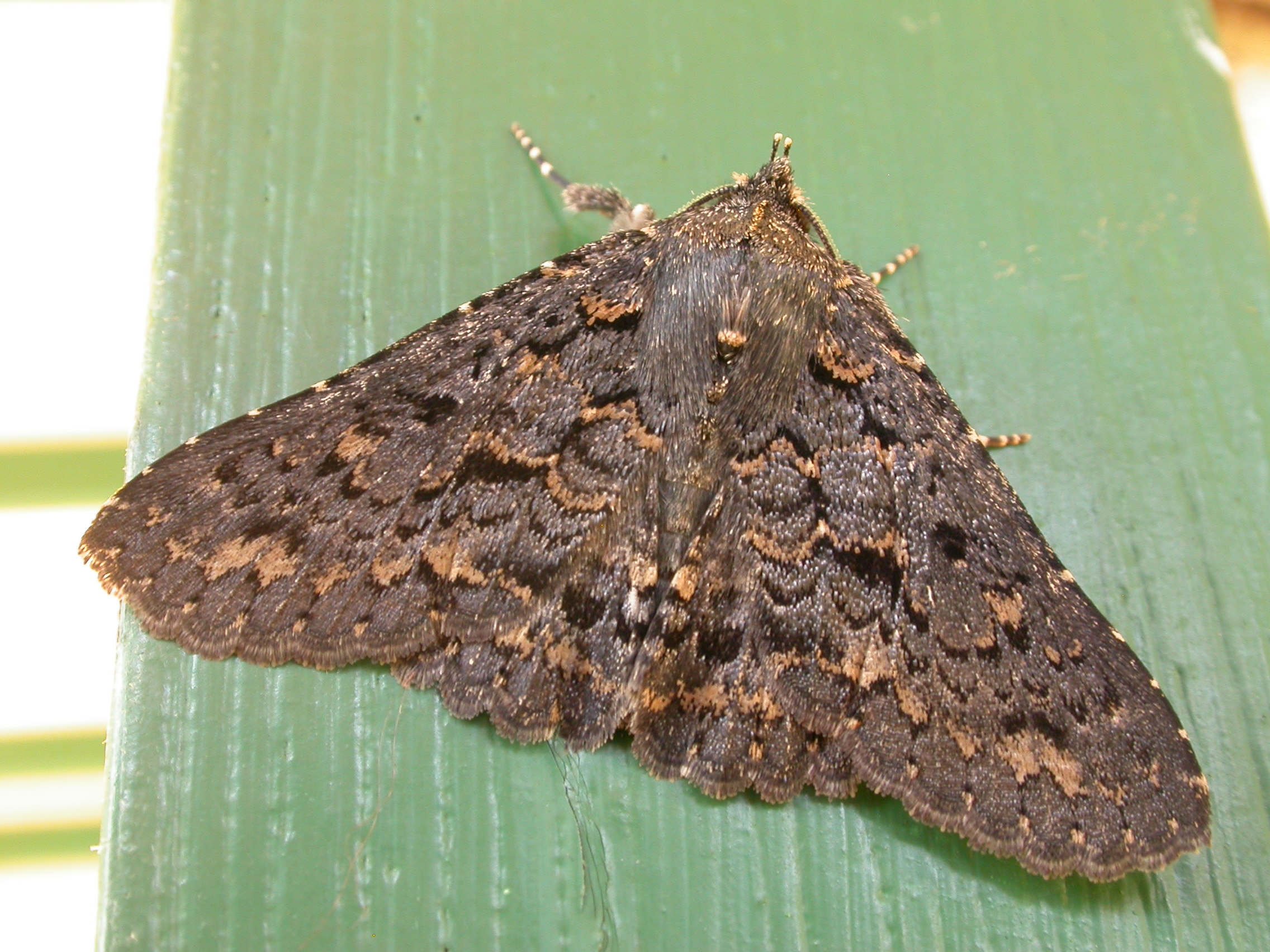

Scientific classification
- Kingdom: Animalia
- Phylum: Arthropoda
- Class: Insecta
- Order: Lepidoptera
- Superfamily: Noctuoidea
- Family: Erebidae
- Genus: Praxis
- Species: P. edwardsii

Binomial name
- Praxis edwardsii Guenée, 1852

= Praxis edwardsii =

Species of moth

Praxis edwardsii, or Edward's praxis, is a moth of the family Noctuidae. The species was first described by Achille Guenée in 1852. It is found in Australia in Queensland, New South Wales, the Australian Capital Territory, Victoria, Tasmania, South Australia and Western Australia.
