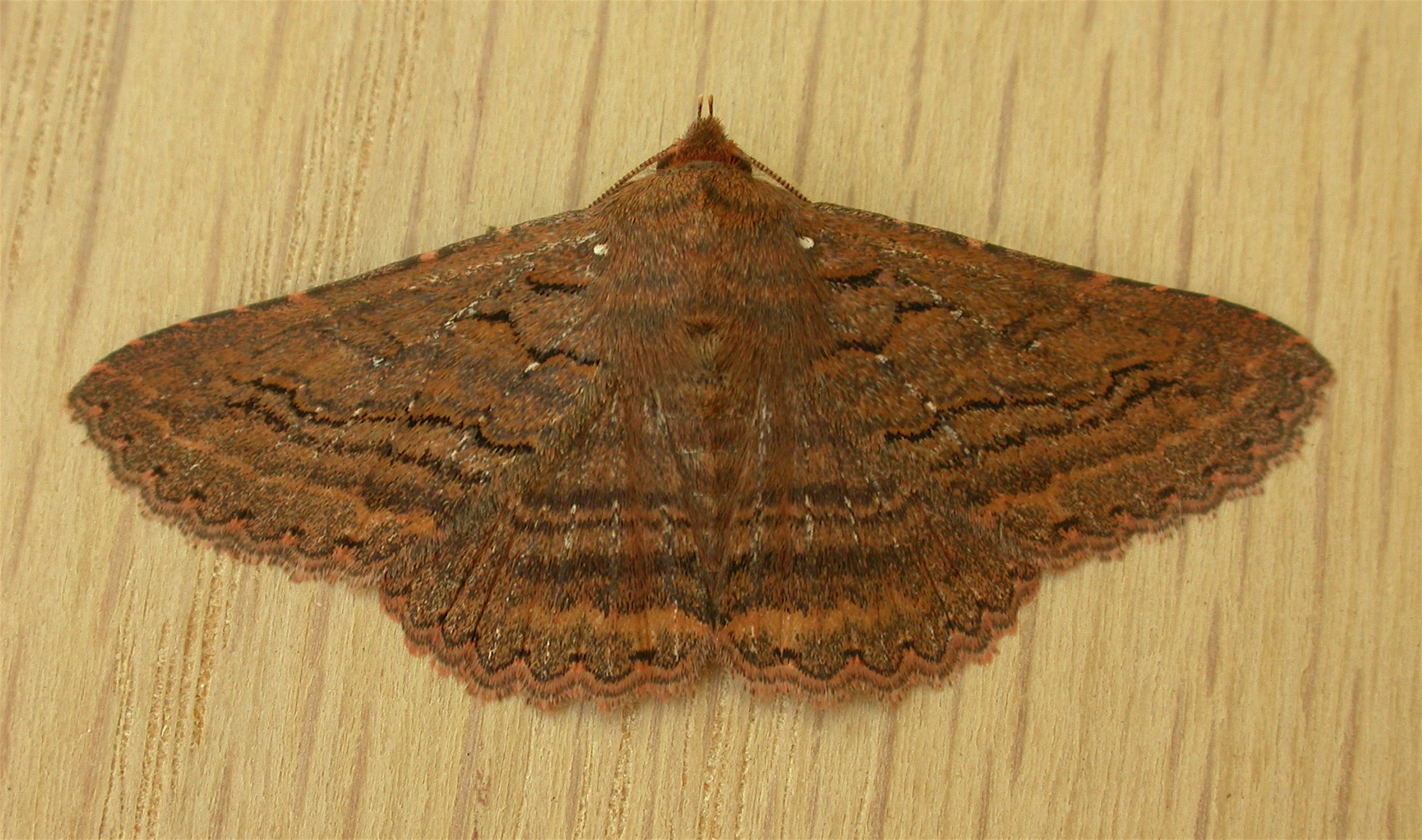

Scientific classification
- Kingdom: Animalia
- Phylum: Arthropoda
- Class: Insecta
- Order: Lepidoptera
- Superfamily: Noctuoidea
- Family: Erebidae
- Genus: Praxis
- Species: P. porphyretica

Binomial name
- Praxis porphyretica Guenée, 1858

Synonyms
- Praxis inordinata

= Praxis porphyretica =

Species of moth

Praxis porphyretica, the brown praxis, is a moth of the family Noctuidae. The species was first described by Achille Guenée in 1858. It is found in the Australian Capital Territory, New South Wales, Queensland, Tasmania and Victoria.
