= Merilyn Tahi =

Vanuatuan women's rights activist (born 1950)

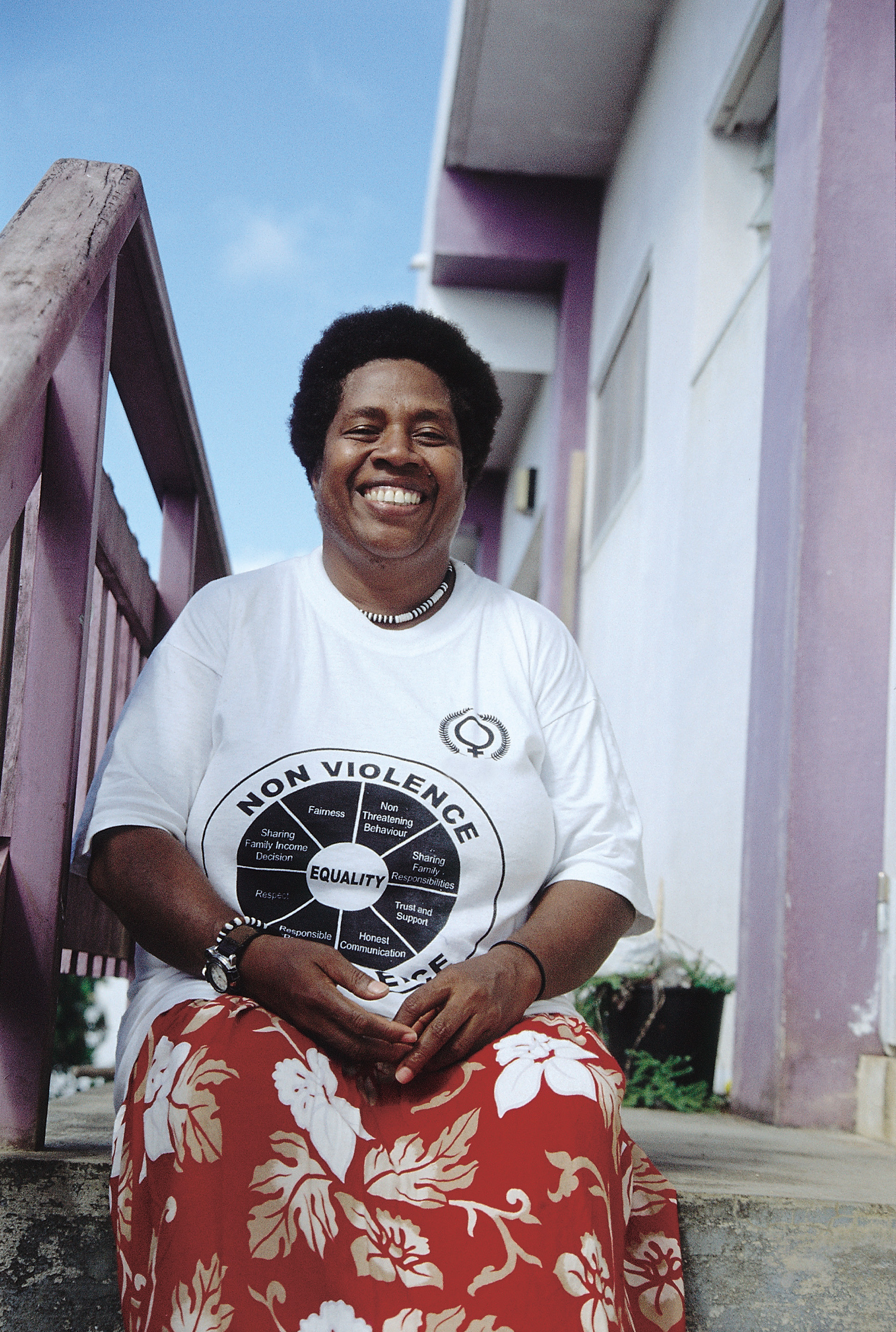
- Coordinator, Vanuatu Women's Centre. The centre provides legal support, counselling, and temporary shelter for women who have been abused and carries out advocacy and awareness raising. Vanuatu 2009
- Born: June 26, 1950 (age 76); Ambae
- Citizenship: Vanuatu
- Employer: Vanuatu Women's Centre
- Awards: Commonwealth Point of Light

Merilyn Tahi (born 26 June 1950) is a campaigner against domestic violence from Vanuatu, who co-founded Vanuatu Women's Centre and was the first woman from the country to become a municipal councillor. She was recognised as the fortieth Commonwealth Point of Light in 2018.

== Early life and education ==
Tahi was born on 26 June 1950 on Ambae. The eldest of seven siblings, her parents worked for the Anglican Mission on the island. She was one of the first students to attend Malapoa College, where she studied from 1966–70, coerced into leaving the school early to marry. She worked for the Vanuatu government for twenty years, before and after independence. In 2003 she graduated from Revans University with a BA in Management.

== Women's rights ==
In 1975 she was elected Vanuatu's first woman to be a municipal councillor. In the 1980s she volunteered of several committees relating to women's issues, as well as the operation of non-governmental organisations in Vanuatu.

In 1992 Tahi co-founded the Vanuatu Women's Centre, which was created to support survivors of domestic violence. In the 1990s gender equality was not a priority for the government and it took courage to hold them to account by establishing the VWC. Women face many barriers to accessing land in the country and in 2004 Tahi used her personal experience to draw attention to homelessness that many Pacific women face. At a regional meeting she recalled how after her death of her husband in 1997, she was thrown out of her matrimonial house. She advocates for home-grown initiatives which are culturally sensitive have the greatest impact on gender-based violence.

Tahi worked as an Election Observer for Nauru in 2016, alongside Anote Tong and Lorna Simon.

During 2018, whilst Vanuatu celebrated thirty-six years of independence and government that it was one of the happiest countries in the world, Tahi challenged this narrative by openly discussing the high levels of domestic violence that women in the country were subjected to. In 2020 Tahi worked with the Vanuatu Women's Centre to mitigate the double impact of Cyclone Harold and COVID-19.

== Awards ==
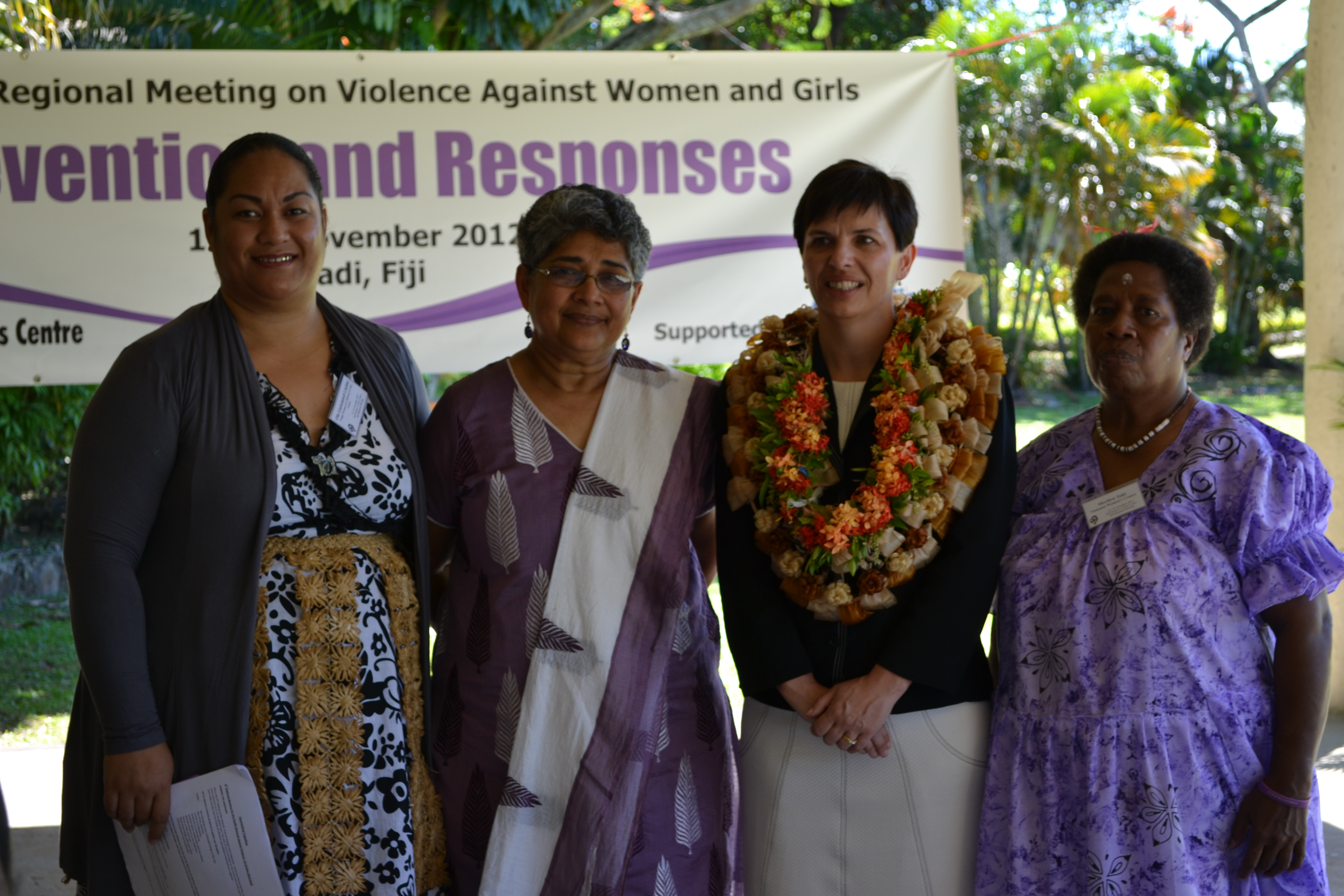
6th Pacific Regional Meeting on Eliminatig Violence Against Women and Girls

In 2018 Tahi was honoured as the 40th Commonwealth Point of Light, a series of award recognising the contributions of volunteers in the Commonwealth of Nations. In her acceptance speech, Tahi stated that she was accepting it on behalf of the Vanuatu Women's Centre.

In 2020 the Australian High Commission recognised Tahi with the 40th Anniversary Gender Equality Advocate Award, a one-off award celebrating her lifetime's work toward gender equality.
