= Sovljak, Ub =

Sovljak Совљак
- Village (Selo)
- Location within Serbia
- Coordinates: 44°27′N 20°02′E
- Country: Serbia
- District: Kolubara District
- Municipality: Ub

Area
  - Total: 17.61 km^{2} (6.80 sq mi)
- Elevation: 104 m (341 ft)

Population (2011)
  - Total: 1,839
  - Density: 104.4/km^{2} (270.5/sq mi)
- Time zone: UTC+1 (CET)
  - Summer (DST): UTC+2 (CEST)
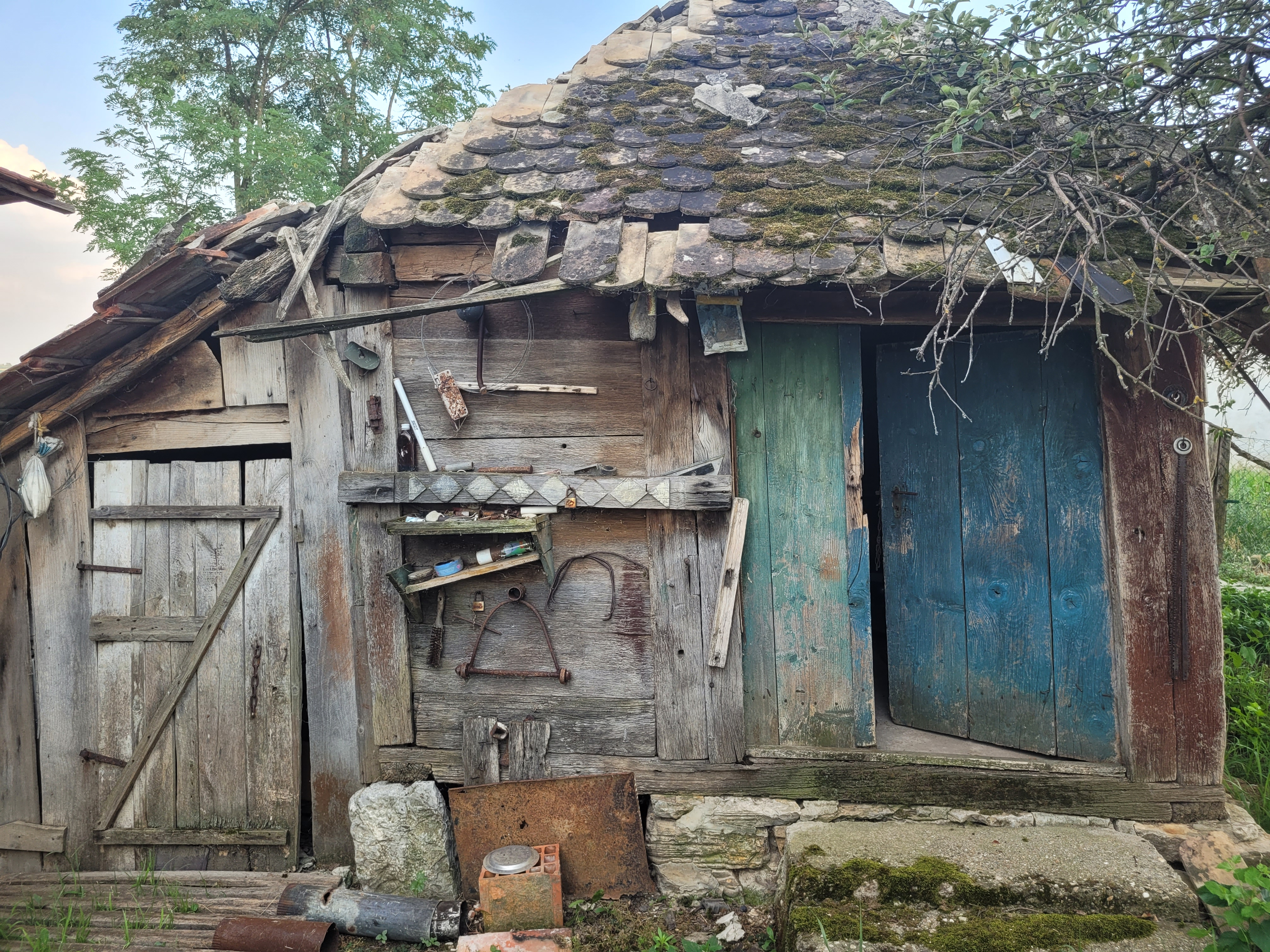
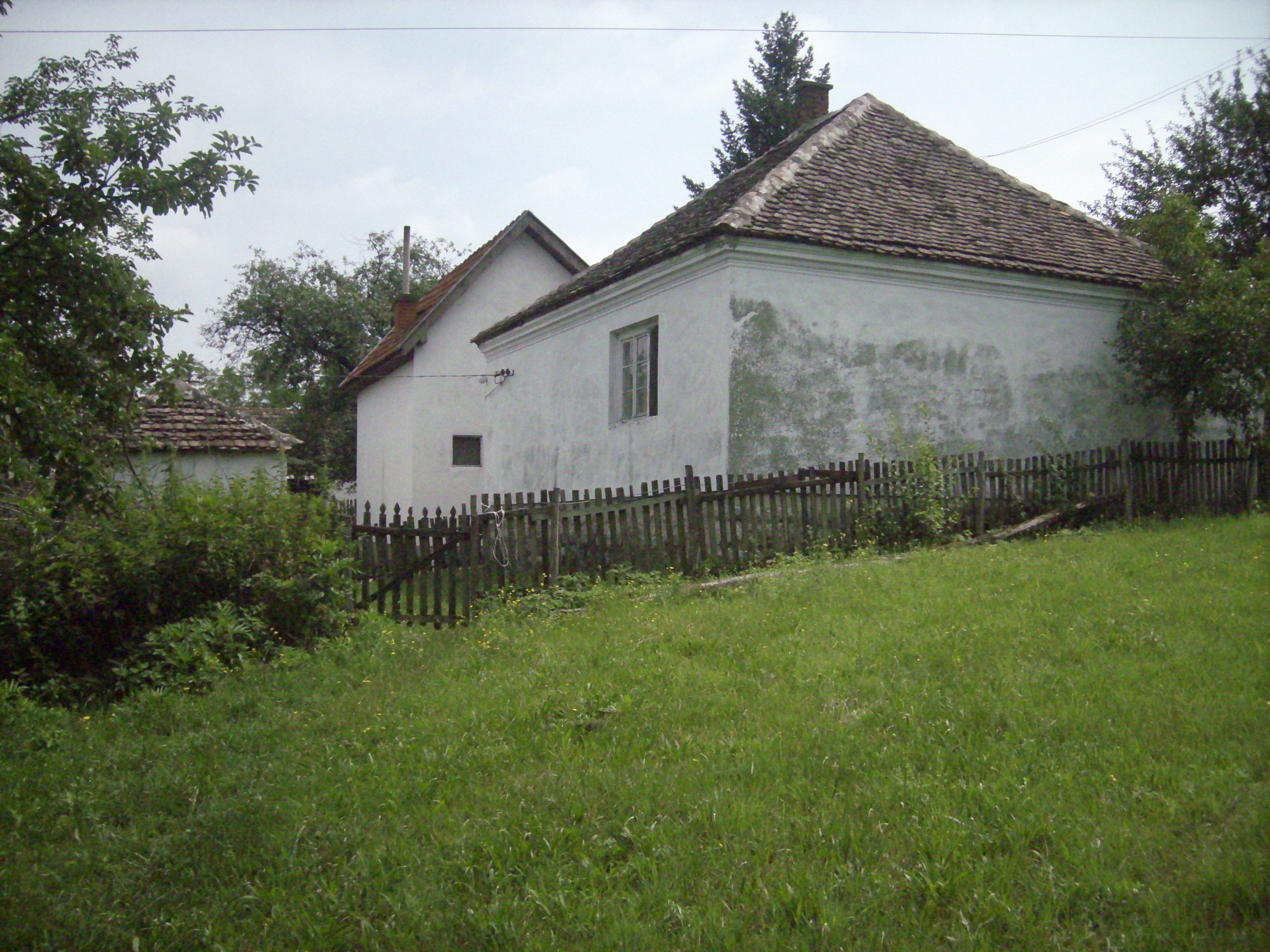
- Old private granary House in Sovljak

Sovljak is a village in the municipality of Ub, Serbia. According to the 2011 census, the village has a population of 1,839 people.
