= Polja =

Polja Поља
- Village
- Location within Montenegro
- Country: Montenegro
- Region: Northern
- Municipality: Mojkovac

Population (2011)
  - Total: 1,281
- Time zone: UTC+1 (CET)
  - Summer (DST): UTC+2 (CEST)

Polja (Montenegrin Cyrillic: Поља) is a village in the municipality of Mojkovac, Montenegro.

== Name ==
The name of this village means "field" in the native serbian language

== Demographics ==
According to the 2003 census, the village has a population of 1,506 people.

According to the 2011 census, its population was 1,281.

Ethnicity in 2011
Ethnicity	Number	Percentage
Montenegrins	865	67.5%
Serbs	363	28.3%
other/unnamed	53	4.1%
Total	1,281	100%
