= Praxis (trade union) =

Irish trade union for professional artists

Praxis: The Artists' Union of Ireland is an Irish trade union for professional artists. It affiliated to SIPTU in 2024.

== History ==
Praxis was founded in its original form during 2020, with approximately 100 founder members; it was launched publicly as a trade union in March 2021. According to the Business Post, its aims are "to unite artists, increase recognition of their role in Irish society and ensure better pay and conditions."

Its first initiative was to campaign against the Arts Council’s existing funding application process. At the time of its launch, a Praxis spokesperson stated that Arts Council funding applications can last for several months, and that many of these applications are unsuccessful. A resolution urging the governing organisation to enhance their application procedure and prioritise artists was approved at the Praxis AGM in February 2021. The artists' union was interested in combining with an existing union in the future, according to their Communications Officer, Azzy O'Connor, who stated that this was essential in order for Praxis to obtain recognition. However, the group had not yet deliberated regarding which union it wished to join. O'Connor declared that artists' conditions of employment had not improved following the onset of the 2008 financial crisis.

In 2022, The Irish Times praised Praxis for its role in lobbying for the creation of the Basic Income for Arts pilot scheme (BIA). It declared that "Praxis, the newly established union for artists, should be commended for getting the scheme over the line."

In 2023, the union was critical of the Arts Council erroneously announcing the receipt of a "life-changing" award to 141 artists.

In 2024, Praxis announced that it completed its affiliation to SIPTU.

== See also ==
- Visual Artists Ireland
