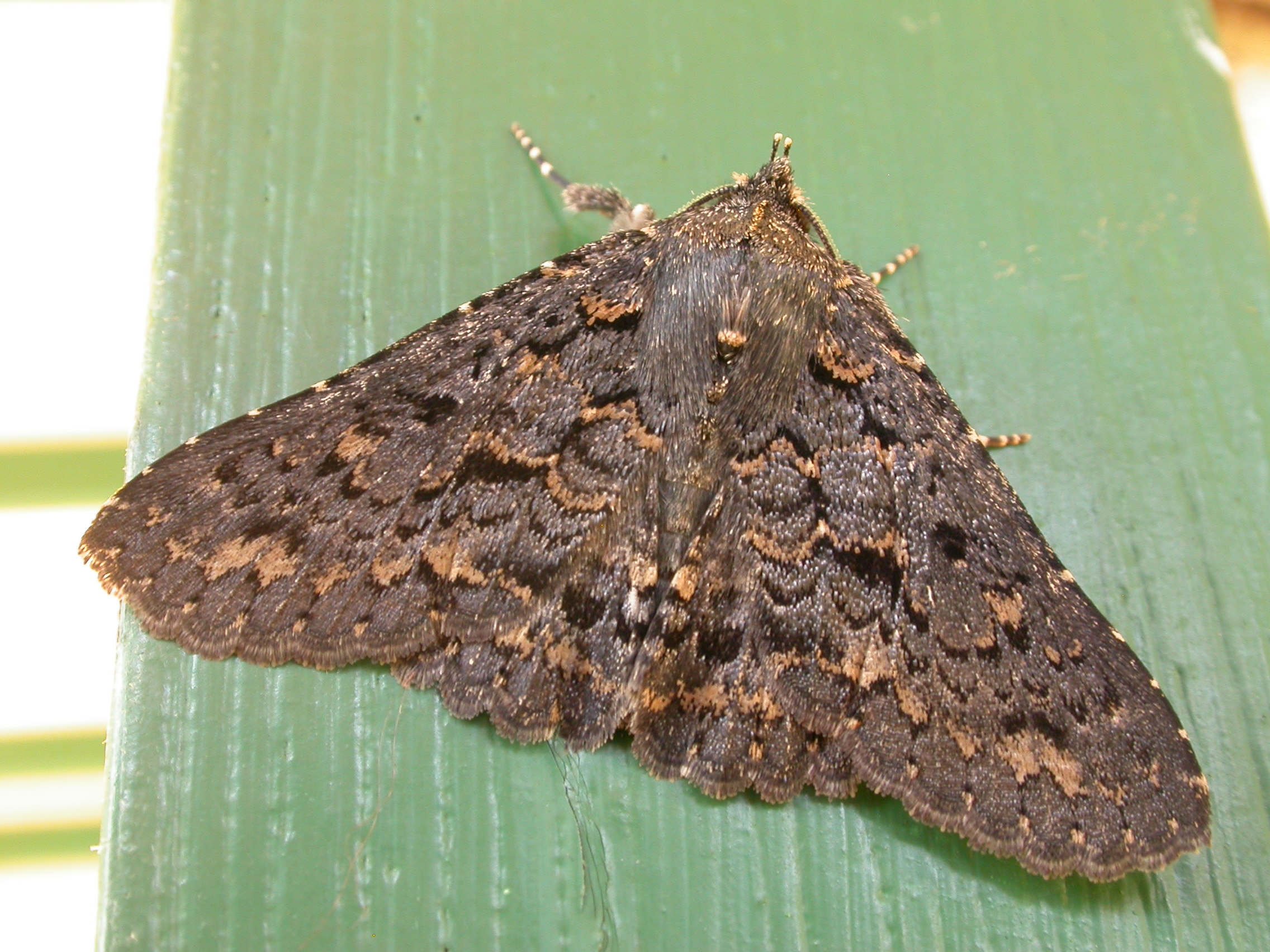

Scientific classification
- Kingdom: Animalia
- Phylum: Arthropoda
- Class: Insecta
- Order: Lepidoptera
- Superfamily: Noctuoidea
- Family: Erebidae
- Subfamily: Calpinae
- Genus: Praxis; Guenée in Boisduval & Guenée, 1852

Synonyms
- Corrha Walker, [1858]; Anugana Strand, 1924

= Praxis (moth) =

Genus of moths

Praxis is a genus of moths of the family Noctuidae. The genus was erected by Achille Guenée in 1852.

== Species ==
- Praxis aterrima Walker, 1856
- Praxis difficilis Walker, [1858]
- Praxis dirigens Walker, 1858
- Praxis edwardsii Guenée, 1852
- Praxis limbatis Strand, 1924
- Praxis marmarinopa Meyrick, 1897
- Praxis pandesma Lower, 1902
- Praxis porphyretica Guenée, 1852
