= Phantom practice =

Phantom practice is the purported phenomenon in which a person's abilities continue to improve, even without practicing at all. It is mostly associated with practicing a musical instrument. After habitual practicing, a person may believe that they have continued to experience improvement even after they stop practicing. Whether these individuals have actually improved or whether it is simply a subjective perception on their part has not been ascertained by researchers.

== Kinesthetic memory ==
The phenomenon of retaining a physical skill that has not been used in a long time is well understood. The physical skills of holding and playing an instrument are held in a reflex-level long-term memory called "kinesthetic memory", "motor memory", or "muscle memory." Kinesthetic memory is very durable, and as such, a person may retain the ability to perform on an instrument that they previously played regularly, even if they have not practiced the instrument for weeks or months.

== Confidence ==
A sense of confidence is an important performing skill. In a musical sense, confidence can translate into a stronger tone, more self-assured entrances, and a better stage presence. A nervous, anxious player or singer, on the other hand, is likely to have a wavering tone, uncertain intonation, and hesitant entrances. Since confidence often develops as a person matures and gains life experience, some people may notice an improvement in playing a former childhood instrument that they take up again as an adult. Again, although such a person may attribute their stronger tone and playing style to "phantom practicing", other factors such as increased confidence may have caused the improvements.

== Rhythmic skill ==
During the interval of not practicing, a person purporting to have experienced "phantom practicing" may have developed other factors besides instrument practicing which contribute to the quality of musical performance, such as rhythmic skill. For example, a drummer who abandons music in their teens, and then studies dancing in their 30s may find, if they return to drumming in their 40s, that their sense of rhythm has improved. While this person might attribute their improved drumming skills to "phantom practice", a more likely explanation is that they improved their rhythmic skills and "time feel" confidence in the intervening decades.

== Knowledge of musical styles and idioms ==
Another possibility is that a person may improve their knowledge of musical styles and idioms during a period of non-practicing. For example, if a person learns all of the core jazz piano techniques in their teens, and then abandons the instrument, followed by a 20-year interval of listening to jazz and going to jazz concerts, this person may feel that they have benefitted from "phantom practicing" if they return to jazz piano playing in their 40s. Instead, it is more likely that the improvement in this person's jazz playing is due to decades of experience of listening to authentic jazz playing "comping" and "blowing".
