= Ksenija Atanasijević =

Serbian philosopher (1894–1981)

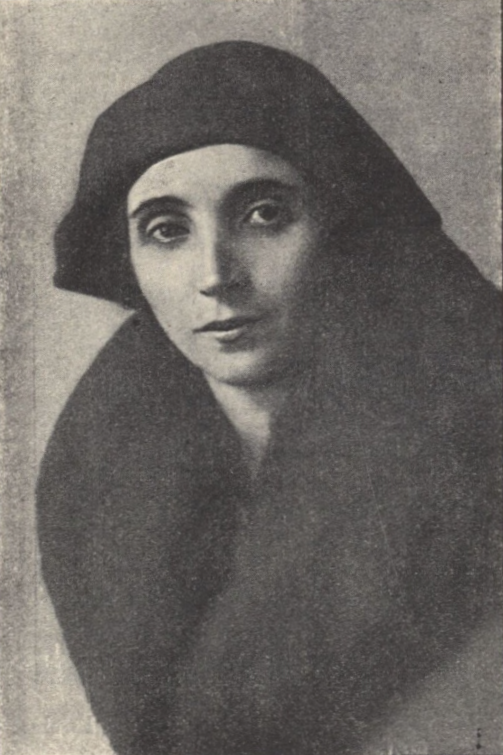
- Born: February 4, 1894; Belgrade, Kingdom of Serbia
- Died: September 29, 1981 (aged 87); Belgrade, Socialist Republic of Serbia, Yugoslavia
- Education: University of Belgrade (Ph.D, Philosophy, 1922)
- Occupations: philosopher, professor, translator

Ksenija Atanasijević (Xenia Atanassievich) (1894–1981) was the first recognised major female Serbian philosopher, and the first female professor of Belgrade University, where she graduated. She wrote about Giordano Bruno, ancient Greek philosophy and the history of Serbian philosophy, and translated important philosophical works into Serbian, including works by Aristotle, Plato, and Spinoza. She was also an early Serbian feminist writer and philosopher.

== Biography ==
Ksenija Atanasijević was born on February 4, 1894, in Belgrade, Kingdom of Serbia. She was the youngest of six children of Doctor Svetozar Atanasijević and Jelena Atanasijević, née Čumić, who died while giving birth to her. Her father was a well-respected doctor and director of the State Hospital in Belgrade. After his death, Ksenija's stepmother, Sofija Kondić, who taught at the Women's College (Viša ženska škola) in Belgrade, became her rightful guardian. Ksenija received her first lessons in philosophy from Sofija: she learned quickly and eagerly, and no sooner another tragedy befall on her. Ksenija's older brother was killed in World War I.

=== Scholarship ===
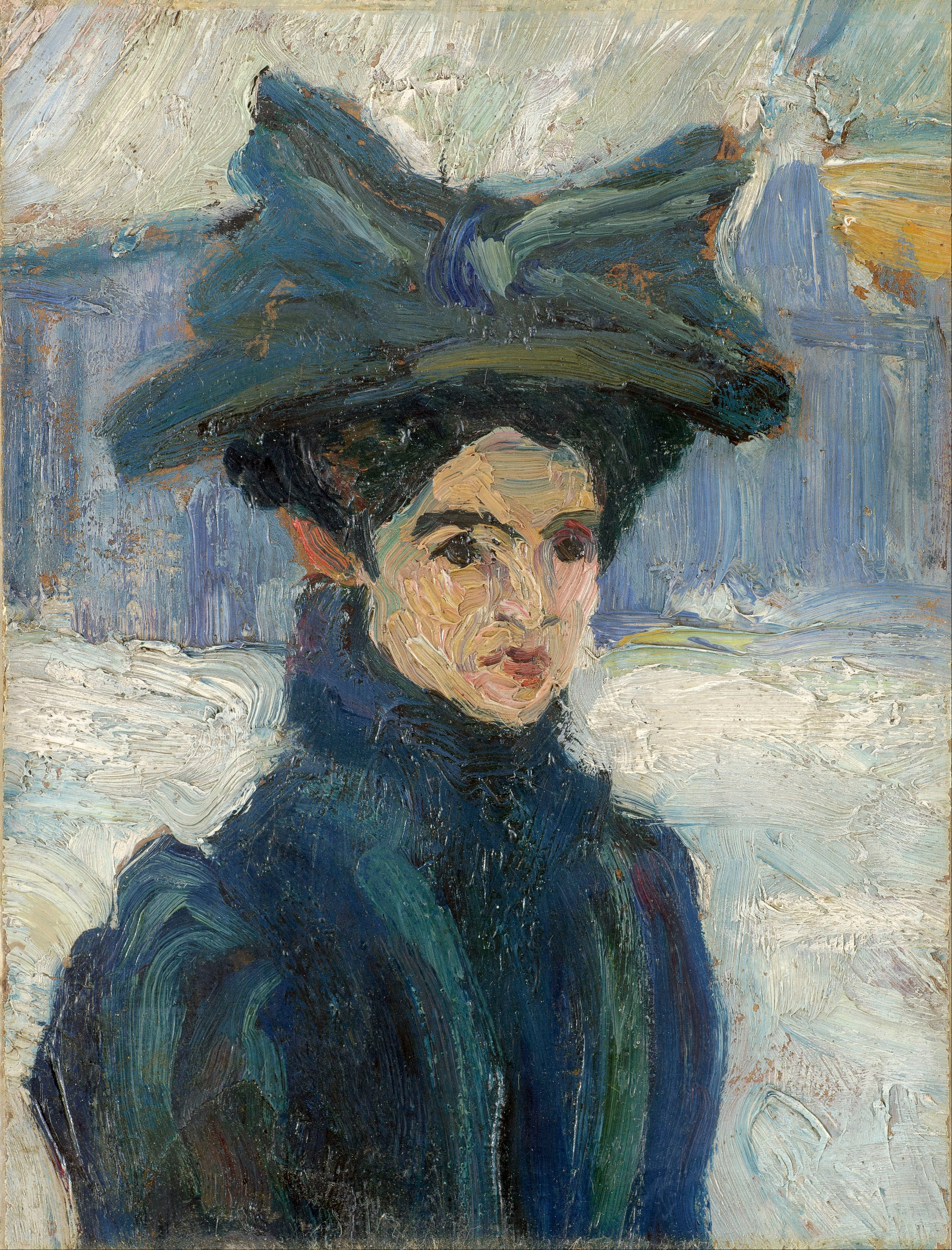
Atanasijević on a painting by Nadežda Petrović (1912)

While Ksenija attended the Lyceum, she was also influenced by Nada Stoiljković, her philosophy professor. Stoiljković suggested that Ksenija should take up philosophy with her former professor at Belgrade, Branislav Petronijević, and so, in the autumn of 1918, Ksenija Atanasijevic became Petronijevic's pupil at the University of Belgrade.

She graduated in July 1920 with the highest marks in her graduating class, obtaining a university diploma in "pure and applied philosophy and classics." An excellent student, she decided to pursue an academic career in philosophy and soon after graduation, began working on a doctoral thesis on Giordano Bruno's De triplici minimo. She went to Geneva and Paris to seek out rare philosophical works and to discuss her thesis with specialists in the field, and on January 20, 1922, defended her Ph.D with honors in Belgrade before a panel of academics. After her thesis was successfully defended, she became the first woman to hold a Ph.D. in the Kingdom of Serbs, Croats, and Slovenes.

=== Recognition ===
In 1924, she became the first female university professor to be appointed to the Arts Faculty, Department of Philosophy at the University of Belgrade, where she taught classics, medieval and modern philosophy and aesthetics. During her teaching career, she was a committed feminist both in theory and practice. She was a member of the Serbian Women's League for Peace and Freedom, the Women's Movement Alliance, and editor of the first feminist journal in the country, "The Women's Movement" (Ženski pokret), published from 1920 to 1938.

At the time the Encyclopædia Britannica cited her study, The Metaphysical and Geometrical Doctrine of Bruno, written in French in Paris in 1924 as an authoritative work about an important and often neglected aspect of Bruno's philosophy. In 1936, she was removed from her teaching position at the University due to her liberalism and lack of conformity with her faculty. Her consequent dismissal caused a considerably outcry in Belgrade among intellectuals, with public figures such as Sima Pandurović and other activists protesting on her behalf.

=== Atanasijević's life 1936–1946 ===
Despite the support Atanasijević received, however, her position at the university was never restored to her, and she spent the rest of her working life—until 1941—as an inspector for the Ministry of Education. World War II brought troubles and unrest, even for the apolitical Ksenija Atanasijević. After writing articles against anti-Semitism and National Socialism, she was arrested by the Gestapo in 1942. Then when the war ended, Atansijević was arrested again, but this time by Tito's communists on charges of war crimes, like those attributed to Veselin Čajkanović and others for teaching during Nazi occupation. Once released, she retired in 1946 after a short stint as an employee of the National Library of Serbia.

== Legacy ==
Ksenija Atansijević left a substantial volume of work, including more than 400 texts, among them books and essays in philosophy, psychology, history, and literature. Her interest in philosophy was broad and eclectic, covering ethics, metaphysics, logic, aesthetics and the history of philosophy. She is best known for her original interpretations of Giordano Bruno's work and for her 'philosophy of meaning' developed in Filozofski fragmenti (Philosophical fragments, 1928–1929), considered by many to be her most important and significant work. She died in Belgrade in 1981.

== Selected works ==
- Brunovo učenje o najmanjem, Belgrade, 1922.
- Počeci filozofiranja kod Grka, Belgrade, 1928.
- Filozofski fragmenti I-II, Belgrade, 1929-30.
- La doctrine métaphysique et géométrique de Bruno, Bg et Paris 1923.
- L'Atomisme d’Epicure, Paris 1928.
- Un fragment philosophique, Belgrade, 1929.
- Considération sur le monde et la vie dans la littérature populaire des Yougoslaves, Paris 1929/30.
- Die gegenwärtigen philosophishen Strömungen in Jugoslawien – Der russische Gedanke, Internationale Zeitschrift für Philosophie, Bonn, 3, 1930.
- Die Anfänge des Philosophiernes bei den Griechen, 1928.
- Organon, a translation
- Ethics, a translation

== See also ==
- Ljubomir Nedić
- Branislav Petronijević
- Petar II Petrović Njegoš
