= Christian theological praxis =

Practice of the Gospel in the world

Christian theological praxis is a term used by most liberation theologians to express how the Gospel of Jesus Christ is to be lived in the world.

== Description ==
Christian praxis is something that goes beyond practices, actions, or behaviors. Praxis is described as a combination of reflection and action that realizes the historicity of human persons. In this sense actions are realized in light of the way they affect history. History has to be seen as a whole, combining in an incarnational way, our salvation history and our "human" history.

== Expression ==
Most liberation theologians see Christian theological praxis mainly as lived and expressed in the life of community. "Any discourse of faith starts from, and takes its bearings from, the Christian life of Community". This is where a community is said to become an expression of the presence of the Kingdom of God, so long as it is being true to its calling to Christian praxis. This has been the vision shared by the basic ecclesial communities, which follow a pattern of Christian praxis based on what Gustavo Gutierrez said: "To be followers of Jesus requires that [we] walk with and be committed to the poor; when [we] do, [we] experience an encounter with the Lord who is simultaneously revealed and hidden in the faces of the poor".

== See also ==
- Catechesis
- Character education
- Liberation theology
- Orthopraxy
- Religious education
