= Vanuatu Women's Centre =

Women's rights organisation in Vanuatu

- VWC logo

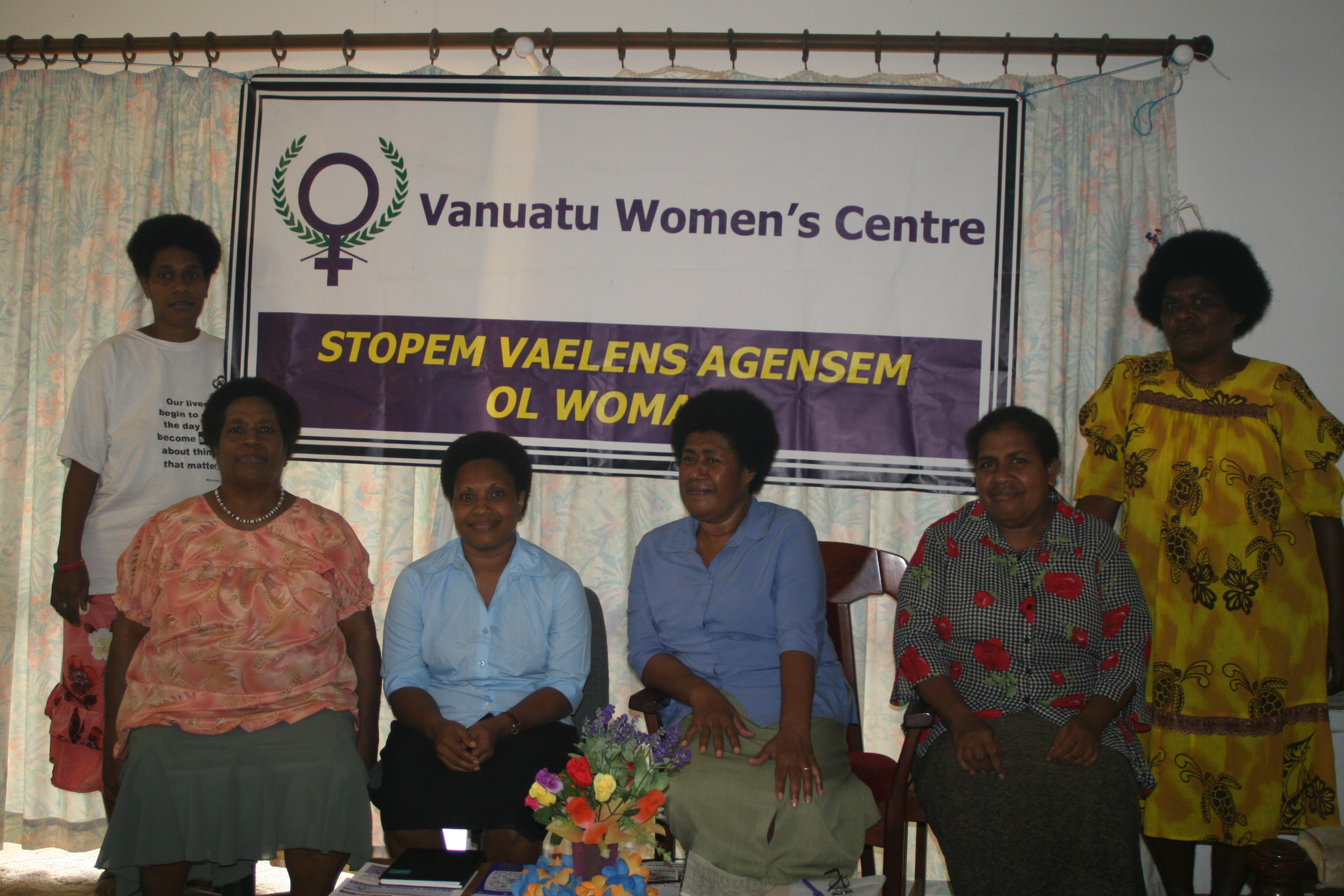
- Vanuatu Women's Centre, Vanuatu 2010.
- Abbreviation: VWC
- Formation: 1992
- Legal status: Non-governmental organisation
- Headquarters: Port Vila
- Location: Vanuatu
- Staff: 50

Vanuatu Women's Centre (VWC) is a women's rights organisation in Vanuatu, which provides services and support for women who are survivors of domestic violence.

== History ==
The Vanuatu Women's Centre was founded in 1992 in order to provide support and advocacy for women who experienced domestic violence. The women responsible for the foundation of the organisation were Merilyn Tahi, Elizabeth Mermer and Janet Boedovo.

== Organisation ==
As of 2015, the VWC consisted of a national centre in Port Vila, as well as three branches in different provinces. In 2015 it led a network of thirty-seven local committees (CAVAWs) active in the fight against violence against women. By 2019 the number of CAVAWs had grown to forty-five. In 2020 the VWC employed fifty staff.

== Initiatives ==
The VWC campaigned in 2005 for the Vanuatu Parliament to ratify the Family Protection Bill after a ten-year process of consultation with communities. Between 2015 and 2017, the VWC facilitated 87% of all family protection orders issued under the act.

In 2009 the VWC conducted the Vanuatu National Survey on Women’s Lives and Family Relationships, which was the first national survey in Vanuatu aimed at uncovering what people thought about issues relating to women's human rights. It aimed to identify a benchmark for the experiences of domestic violence in the country, as well as recording the effects of gender-based violence on women and children. It also aimed to identify coping strategies that women use, risk and protective factors within communities, as well as the implications of and need for support services. The survey discovered that 60% of women from Vanuatu had experienced violence against them during their lifetime and 44% had experienced it in the previous twelve months.

The VWC began to provide training for the Vanuatu Police Force in 2014. This training was designed to not just build awareness of violence against women, but to encourage male police officers to refer survivors of violence to the VWC for support.

In the aftermath of Cyclone Pam in 2015, the VWC began a new partnership with ActionAid Australia to provide support, sanitary supplies, and safe spaces for women displaced by the disaster, as a component of emergency disaster relief in Vanuatu.

The provision of counselling for women in Vanuatu is a major aspect of VWC's work and in the 2018 financial year alone it provided 6574 sessions for 1811 clients.

The VWC became involved in efforts to support communities in the aftermath of Cyclone Harold in April 2020. Counsellors travelled to where women who were affected lived, as well as supporting women who had been made homeless by the storm. This work highlighted that for many women in rural areas, domestic violence is still common. In November 2020 a new telephone helpline for women experiencing domestic violence was launched by the VWC. The helpline is free to call and also offers support and counselling to women and girls who are experiencing other forms of trauma.

== Awards ==
Merilyn Tahi was presented with the fortieth Commonwealth Point of Light Award, which she accepted on behalf of the VWC.

== Historiography ==
During the 1990s the organisation had to strike a careful balance between its work as a women's rights organisation and resisting the label of 'feminist' due to anti-Western attitudes towards feminism in Vanuatu, which were described by anthropologist, Bronwen Douglas, in the following way: "feminism and activist remain dirty words, laden with connotations of heartless globalization and irreligion".
