= Praxis (British philosophy journal) =

- Discipline: Philosophy
- Language: English
- Edited by: Pablo López-Silva

Publication details
- History: 2008–present
- Publisher: University of Manchester (U.K.)
- Frequency: Annually
- Open access: Yes

Standard abbreviations
- ISO 4: Praxis (Manch.)

Indexing
- ISSN: 1756-1019

Praxis is a peer-reviewed online postgraduate journal of philosophy affiliated with the University of Manchester. The journal was created in 2007. The first issue was published in April 2008. Praxis publishes papers, book reviews and interviews.

== Notable interviews ==
- Tim Crane (University of Cambridge)
- Peter Goldie (University of Manchester)
- Barry Hoffmaster (University of Western Ontario)
- John Harris (University of Manchester)
- Ronald de Sousa (University of Toronto)

== Editorial team ==
Editor

Pablo López-Silva (University of Manchester)

Book Editor

Leo Tarasov (University of Manchester)

Editorial Assistant

Aaron Wilson (University of Manchester)

== Consulting Board ==
- Prof Tim Bayne (University of Manchester)
- Prof Helen Beebee (University of Manchester)
- Prof Thomas Uebel (University of Manchester)
- Prof Cynthia Macdonald (University of Manchester)
- Dr Joel Smith (University of Manchester)

== Academic Board ==
David Chalmers (Australian National University); Peter Galison (University of Harvard); Marc Lange (University of North Carolina at Capel Hill); Jonathan Lowe (University of Durham); Daniel Nolan (Australian National University); David Papineau (King's College London); Stefano Predelli (University of Nottingham); Ronnie de Sousa (University of Toronto); Howard Wettstein (University of California Riverside); Dan Zahavi (University of Copenhagen)

== Past editors ==
- 2011–2012: Howard Kelly and Andy Routledge
- 2010–2011: Jean Moritz Mueller and Hichem Naar
- 2007–2009: Vasco Castela and Paula Satne Jones
