= Vladimir Dvorniković =

Serbian philosopher and ethno-psychologist

- Born: July 28, 1888
- Died: September 30, 1956 (aged 68); Belgrade, Yugoslavia
- Occupation: philosopher

Vladimir Dvorniković (28 July 1888 – 30 September 1956) was a Serbian ethnic Croat and politically Yugoslav philosopher, ethno-psychologist, a strong proponent of Yugoslav ethnicity and a professor at the University of Zagreb during the 1920s. Dvorniković was also an advocate of psychologism and animal philosophy. He is best known for authoring the book "Characterology of the Yugoslavs."

== Biography ==
=== Early life ===
Vladimir Dvorniković was born in Severin na Kupi, in the Kingdom of Croatia and Slavonia, Austria-Hungary. His father Ljudevit-Lujo was a college teacher, while his mother Marjana was an educator and a part-time publicist. Vladimir was the eldest of eleven children. He attended high school from 1898 to 1906 in Zemun and Sarajevo. In his 3rd year of high school he became interested in literature and was an enthusiastic reader of the works of Herbert Spencer and Ernst Haeckel.

Dvorniković traveled abroad in 1906 to study philosophy in Vienna. He received his doctorate from Vienna in 1911 with his thesis titled "About the necessity of the psychological establishment of the cognitive theory". He relocated to Sarajevo, Bihać, and Zagreb to commit to teaching in 1910.

He proclaimed himself as a psychologist in the book "Both essential types of philosophizing - Attempt of psychological orientation in current philosophical currents", published in German in Berlin in 1917. During the first World War he was sentenced to Bihać for labor due to his pro-Yugoslav orientation. Dvorniković later arrived in Zagreb where he then worked in a musical school.

=== Academia ===
In 1919 he began lecturing at the University of Zagreb on the subject of philosophy and science. From 1925 to 1926, he was a full-time professor there. His predecessors were Franjo Marković, Đuro Arnold and Albert Bazala. Dvorniković and Bazala both rejected the old education-system scheme of Johann Friedrich Herbart. A strong proponent of "integrated Yugoslavism", he was an opponent to political demagogy and to the Kingdom of Yugoslavia. As a result, in 1926 - only a year prior to becoming a regular professor, he retired from academia at age 38.

=== Post-university life ===
After his departure from the University of Zagreb, Dvorniković became active in public affairs. He hosted roughly 400 lectures in public across all parts of united Yugoslavia, and also in Vienna, Prague, and Zurich. He participated in various discussions, studies, essays, articles, displays, and criticisms. He then moved to Belgrade and after the establishment of the 6 January Dictatorship, fully cooperated with the new regime. Dvorniković became an assistant to the Ministry of Education in 1933 but soon resigned in 1934. He authored the book "Battle of Ideas" in 1937, and his more famous work in 1939, titled "Characterology of the Yugoslavs."

During the Second World War he settled peacefully in Belgrade. After the establishment of Communist Yugoslavia, he was enrolled as a member of the "Commission for the Construction of Appellation in Architecture." from 1945 to 1950. Dvorniković authored smaller articles regarding the history of culture, archeology, ethnology, and psychology, and was briefly involved in photography.

Dvorniković died in Belgrade on 30 September 1956, in what was at the time the Socialist Republic of Serbia, SFR Yugoslavia.

== Yugoslav Characterology ==
Written in Serbo-Croatian, Karakterologija Jugoslavena, addresses the need to establish a national character within the entire country of the then-Yugoslavia. Dvorniković wrote that it is important to combine all elements of Yugoslavia and to create one people, the Yugoslavs. He claimed that Serbs and Croats could only survive as a strong nation by integrating into one people, such as the unification of Germans into Germany or that of Italians into Italy.

The book did not dismiss the differences among people that inhabited Yugoslavia, but stressed that these differences were "contingent and temporary and that they mask a deeper and more profound racial unity". He also advocated the idea of a Dinaric race, and Dvorniković provided an overall comprehensive description of unified Yugoslav mythology.

== Works ==
Along with other texts, he published the following works:

- Die beiden Grundtypen des Philosophierens, Berlin, 1918. (Oba osnovna tipa filozofiranja)
- Savremena filozofija (2 sveska), Zagreb, 1919. i 1920.
- Studije za psihologiju pesimizma (2 sveska), Zagreb, 1923. i 1924.
- Psiha jugoslavenske melankolije, Zagreb, 1925. (2. prerađeno izdanje)
- Tipovi negativizma, Zagreb, 1926.
- T. G. Masaryk kao filozof i sociolog, Prag, 1927. (objavljeno na češkom i na "jugoslavenskom")
- Borba ideja, Beograd, 1937.
- Karakterologija Jugoslavena, Beograd, 1939.
