= Helsinki Group =

Helsinki Group may refer to several human rights organizations:

- International Helsinki Federation for Human Rights and its successor Helsinki Committee for Human Rights
- British Helsinki Human Rights Group
- Commission on Security and Cooperation in Europe also known as U.S. Helsinki Commission
- Helsinki Watch, a U.S. non-governmental organization, predecessor of Human Rights Watch
- In the former Soviet Union:
  - Moscow Helsinki Group (1976–2023)
  - Ukrainian Helsinki Group (1976–81)
  - Lithuanian Helsinki Group (1976–82)
  - Georgian Helsinki Union (1976–93), part of Round Table—Free Georgia

== See also ==
- Helsinki Commission (disambiguation)
