= 2013 Czech Anti-Roma protests =

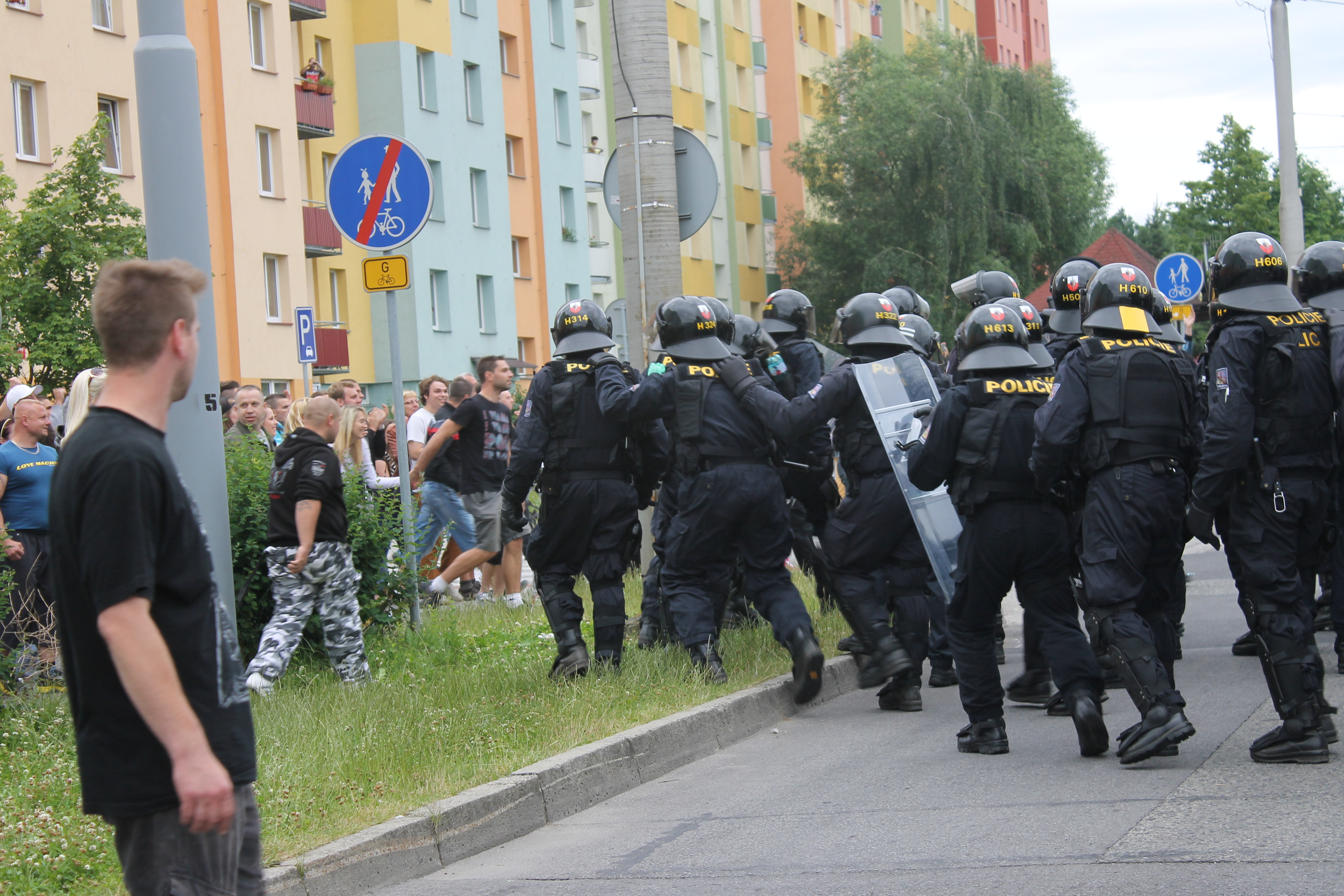
- Police clash with protesters in České Budějovice
- Date: 29 May 2013 – December 2013
- Location: Czech Republic
- Caused by: Roma attack on a married Czech couple Dispute between Roma and Czech parents at a playground Anti-Romani sentiment
- Result: Protests suppressed: Numerous Roma houses burned and damaged by protesters; Increase in Anti-Romani sentiment among Czechs; Increase in the number of active Czech police officers

Parties
Protesters: (Czech Republic) Czech protesters; Workers' Party of Social Justice; Various Far-Right groups	Counter protesters: (Romani people) Romani counter protesters; UNITED for Intercultural Action	Czech Republic: Czech police

Number
Thousands	Unknown	Unknown number of police officers

Casualties and losses
Hundreds wounded; Hundreds arrested	Unknown wounded	Hundreds wounded

In 2013, numerous Anti-Romani protests took place across the Czech Republic. This was after a Czech couple was attacked by 5 Romani on 18 May 2013. The couple was hospitalized after the attack. The protests in some cities were described as a "street war".

== Background ==
Prior to the protests, Amnesty International and the European Roma Rights Centre (ERRC) had raised concerns about the safety of Romani people in the Czech Republic. The ERRC had documented that between January 2008 and December 2012, at least 48 violent attacks against Roma had been documented. A notable attack was the 2009 Vítkov arson attack which left 3 people injured including a 3-year-old girl who suffered life-threatening burns on 80% of her body. Human rights groups had also accused Czech authorities of placing a disproportionately high number of Roma children into schools for the disabled. According to a 2010 opinion poll, 68% of Czechs have antipathy towards Romani. The survey also found that 82% Czechs oppose any form of a "special care of Roma rights", 83% of Czechs consider Romani asocial, and 45% of Czechs would support the expulsion of Romani people from the Czech Republic.

A 2011 poll, which followed a number of violent attacks by Romani perpetrators against ethnic Czech victims, reported that 44% of Czechs are afraid of Roma people. The poll also reported 90% of Czechs do not want Roma people as neighbours. The polls in 2011 came after a violent series of protests took place after an incident on 7 August 2011 when staff members of a gambling hall in Nový Bor were attacked by multiple Roma welding machetes. The 2011 protests became more widespread and violent after an attack on 21 August 2011 where 20 Roma with machetes attacked 6 Czech men in Rumburk. A survivor of the attack, Michal Němeček, told Deutsche Welle "They shouted ‘you white bastards' at us. We definitely weren't the ones who provoked the attack, six against 20? We would have been crazy. They were just walking along the street and we were the first ones they ran into".

Of the estimated 250,000 Roma in the Czech Republic in 2011, one third lived in ghettos and 90% were reported to be unemployed. The unemployment rate of the Czech Republic in 2013 was 6.95%.

== Protests ==
=== May ===
On 29 May 2013, after 5 Romas were charged for an assault on a married couple in the town of Duchcov, 800 protesters marched onto the streets. Organizer of the march, Jindřich Svoboda, stated that the event should be "a peaceful event without violence". However, a half an hour after Svoboda's speech, the protesters marched towards the southern part of the city which housed a large Roma population. At 7pm, they were confronted by police. Protesters armed with baseball bats and poles attempted to push through the police line while shouting: "Let us at them!" By 8pm, 2 protesters were arrested and the bats and poles were confiscated. 3 other people were convicted after making Facebook posts saying that they were going to "kill them all" or that "I'm going to sharpen my knives".

=== June ===
On 21 June, a dispute between Roma and Czech parents took place at a playground near the Máj housing estate. Up to 100 people joined the growing mob. The dispute caused the protests to become more widespread.

On 22 June, riot police clashed with right-wing protesters after the protesters had staged a demonstration. The demonstration took a violent turn when the protesters had tried to cross the police line separating them from Romanis. By the end of the clashes, 3 protesters, 2 officers and one photographer had been wounded. 22 protesters were also arrested. (Note: Initially reported as 9)

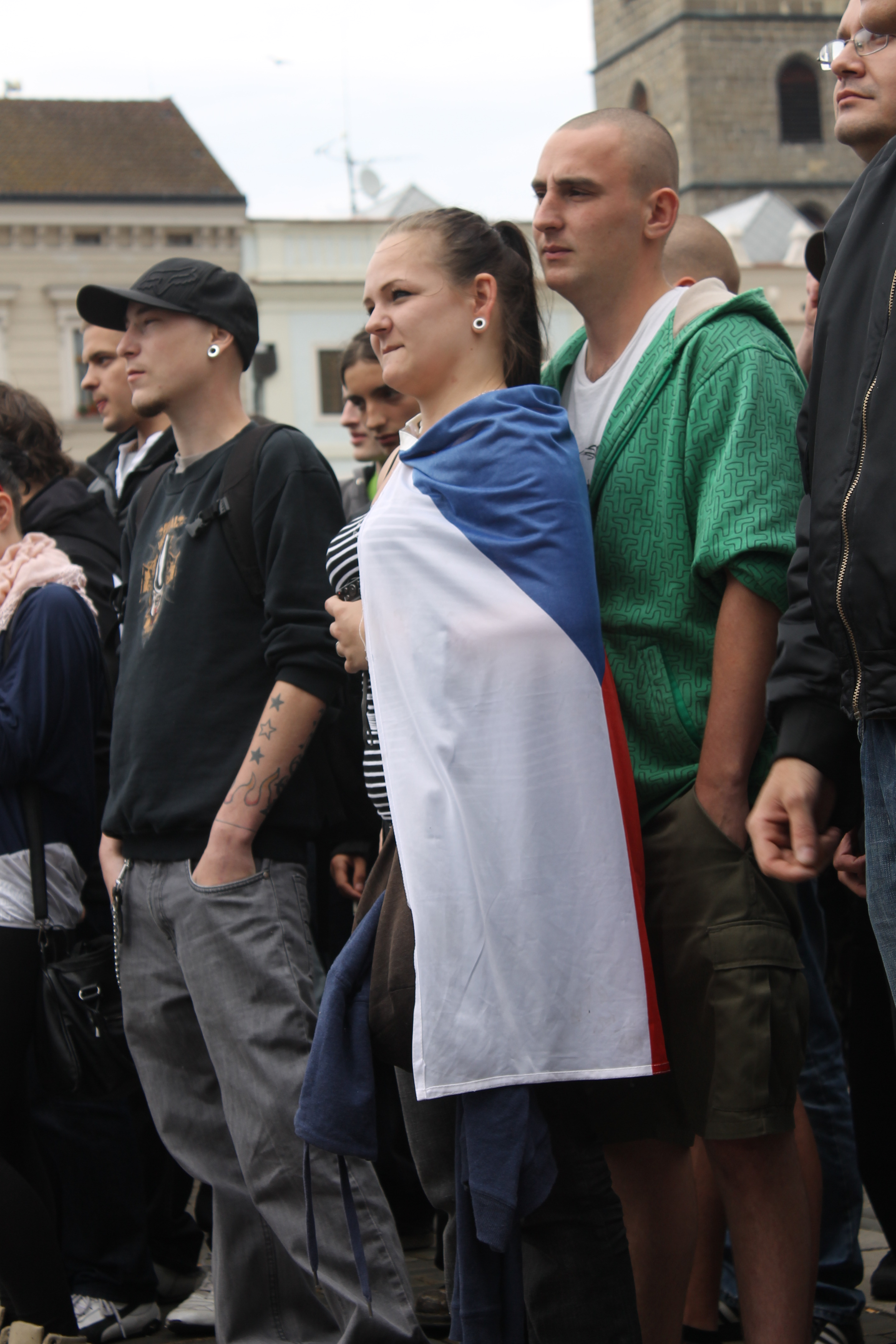
Anti-Roma protesters at Přemysl Otakar II Square in České Budějovice

On 29 June, hundreds of Neo-Nazis marched towards the Máj housing estate which housed 350 Romanis. The march was in response to the dispute on the 18th of June. As they marched, they were cheered on by local residents. They, protesters tried to break through the police barrier. After a violent clash that left dozens of people on both sides wounded, the police arrested 40 people.

=== July ===
On 1 July, in the city of České Budějovice, hundreds of protesters marched to a neighborhood with a dense Roma population. After encountering police forces, the protesters chanted racist slogans and threw bottles and stones. After hours of clashes with the police who used smoke bombs, tear gas, and riot equipment, the protest was disbursed with 39 people being detained.

On 5 July, Czech police setup a checkpoint in Lišov due to the announcement of a planned protest on July 6.

On 6 July, 300 protesters clashed with police officers in České Budějovice. Per police spokesman Jiří Matzner, 3 police officers were injured during the clashes. Czech Police detained 136 protesters. (Note: Initially reported as 60) Police also confiscated baseball bats and poles from protesters. 3 protesters were later charged with assault against an officer. The city itself was described to have been "turned into a fortress".

On 10 July, a meeting was held by municipal leaders in a sports hall in České Budějovice in order to discuss the growing anti-Romani unrest in the city.

On 13 July, a crowd of 300 protesters in České Budějovice staged a demonstration. After clashes with Czech police, 3 protesters were charged with attacking police officers. Roughly 60 other protesters were also detained by police but were released shortly after. In Duchcov, 50 protesters marched in support of the protesters from České Budějovice.

On 14 July, Czech police arrested a man in České Budějovice who attempted to light a Roma apartment building on Novohradská Street on fire.

On 18 July, Czech police were called after 2 packages resembling bombs were found in a Roma ghetto in Machnín by local resident Milan Gábor. Police spokesperson in České Budějovice Jiří Matzner, released a report which stated that a young Czech woman had been assaulted by a Roma at a playground and that none of the suspects had been taken into custody. The incident further increased anger against the Romani people of the Czech Republic.

On 25 July, the Democratic Workers’ Party (Czech: Demokratická strana pracujících) announced that the party was preparing to hold 13 protests in the cities of Bohumín, České Budějovice, Duchcov, Frýdek-Místek, Havířov, Krupka, Litvínov-Janov, Most-Chanov, Ostrava, Prague, Přerov, Ústí nad Labem, and Vítkov before the end of the year.

On 27 July, 30 members of the Czech Lions (Čeští lvi) gathered in Prague to listen to a speech by Pavel Sládek Matějný. Counter-protesters interrupted Pavel's speech by chanting: "We don’t want neo-Nazis here!" At 6pm local time, everybody went home without the police having to interfere.

=== August ===
On 3 August, in the town of Vítkov, 300 protesters (Note: of which, less than 150 were far-right per Czech authorities) marched through the city's streets, shouting slogans such as "Bohemia to Bohemia" and "Our streets, our cities". The protesters then attempted to get to the Roma assembly. However, Police officers pushed them out of Husova Street in order to prevent a confrontation with the Roma protesters there.

On 14 August, the Roma Democratic Party was founded in response to the protests. It aimed to better represent the Roma of the Czech Republic in the Czech Parliament.

On 23 August, Czech police announced that they had arrested over 230 protesters over the past three weekends.

On 24 August, seven protests took place simultaneously in the cities of Ostrava, Duchcov, České Budějovice, Jičín, Plzeň, Brno, Děčín and Varnsdorf. In Ostrava, 1,500 protesters attempted to break into houses that were inhabited by Roma. After a clash with police, the crowd was broken up by tear gas. Over 60 people were detained while many protesters and police officers were wounded. The protests were condemned by Czech president Miloš Zeman. Czech officials said that some cities resembled a warzone.

On 25 August, a total of 2,000 protesters participated in multiple simultaneous protests in the cities and towns of Ostrava, Duchcov, České Budějovice, Jičín, Plzeň and Brno and clashed with Roma counter protesters. In Ostrava, after clashes with police officers, over 60 people were arrested while another 25 people were arrested in Plzeň.

=== September ===
On 1 September, 300 protesters (Note: 50 Neo-Nazis and 250 local residents per Deutsche Welle) marched over a chalk drawing of the Romani flag in Duchcov while chanting "This is our home" and "Bohemia for Czechs".

On 5 September, the Roma Democratic Party, announced that it would be running in the 2013 Czech parliamentary election.

On 6 September, Roma activists requested more protection against attacks from extremists protesters.

On 26 September, an Anti-Roma rally took place in České Budějovice along Lannová třída and Na Sadech street.

On 27 September, a crowd of 1,000 protesters attempted to break into a dormitory in Ostrava where many Roma lived. Police officers clashed with protesters who threw rocks, bottles, and shot fireworks at police officers, causing casualties. After an hour, the police detained 21 people and charged one with assault. Police spokeswoman Gabriela Holčáková said that the police only intervened after the crowd did not respond to police calls to disburse.

On 28 September (celebrated as Czech Statehood Day), three simultaneous protests took place in the cities and towns of Krupka, Prague and Vítkov. In Krupka, around 350 Romani counter-protesters clashed with Neo-Nazis who were distributing flyers for the Workers' Party of Social Justice.

=== October ===
On 6 October, hundreds of Roma staged a protest in Prague, carrying banners that read "We are Roma" and "Stop pogroms against the Roma".

On 28 October, between 200 and 300 protesters marched towards two hostels in Ostrava at 2pm CEST. 500 Romani showed up to counterprotest. Czech police successfully kept the two groups from clashing. At the Old Town Square in Prague, 50 members from UNITED for Intercultural Action marched in support of the Roma counter protesters. After chanting slogans, they hosted a banner in front of the Old Town Hall which read: "OSTRAVA, STOP NAZI MARCH".

=== November ===
On 12 November, Czech police charged a 16-year-old girl with assault after she had thrown bricks and stones at police officers during an Anti-Roma protest in Ostrava.

On 28 November, Czech police reported that the protests near the Máj housing estate had "calmed down" for the first time in 5 months.

== Aftermath ==
=== Reactions by Czech officials ===
The Mayor of Duchcov, Jitka Bártová said in an interview that the events on May 29 "cannot be overlooked" and that the events could "trigger a war of blacks against whites". The Mayor of České Budějovice, Juraj Thoma said that the protests "could not be prevented".

David Tišer, a member of the Czech government's council on the Roma minority told Deutsche Welle in an interview: "These are not just marches by extremists. Regular citizens are joining in as well. And this is what is dangerous. This is why the foreign media are interested. This is why you are talking to me today."

Czech senator Pavel Lebeda, said that the protests were a "sad that expressions of citizens' dissatisfaction with the violent and property crime of gypsies, their laziness, abuse of the social system and inability to live together are immediately classified as extremism".

On 28 June 2013, Senator Tomio Okamura of the Dawn – National Coalition stated in a text message: "The gypsies should strive for their own state. Let's help them do it. It's not the fault of the neo-Nazis, the Czechs or the Turks that gypsies are perceived pejoratively today; rather, it is the gypsies' disrepute". He then suggested that the Czech government should deport the Romani people to India.

On 2 August 2013, the Minister of the Interior Martin Pecina, announced that the Czech Police would increase their number of officers from 1,000 to 40,000 by 2014 in response to the protests.

=== Reactions by Czech organizations ===
Zdeněk Ryšavý of Romea.cz dubbed the protests as "The largest hunt for Roma in the modern history of the Czech Republic".

On 24 August 2013, IUSTITIA set up a hotline for Roma who had been attacked during the protests.

On 10 September 2013, the Czech Helsinki Committee wrote a report which said that the position of the Roma in the Czech Republic is "rapidly deteriorating" and that negative anti-Roma sentiments are growing and that Roma citizens are being labeled as the culprits of various problems in Czech society which is resulting in more and more people turning their anger against the Roma population. The report also noted that anti-Roma demonstrations and marches participates include not only members of the Czech far-right, but also more and more people from the general population of the Czech Republic.

Per the Security Information Service, anti-Roma sentiments among ordinary citizens of the Czech Republic could potentially represent a greater danger than extremist groups.

=== International reactions ===
On 18 July 2013, Janez Lenarčič, the director of Office for Democratic Institutions and Human Rights, called on Czech authorities address segregation and social exclusion to help prevent anti-Roma incidents. He then added: "The measures taken by the Czech police to protect all citizens show that authorities have the resolve to prevent further escalation of racist violence and manifestations of hatred. I am, however, very concerned about the significant support far-right activists have enjoyed from ordinary citizens. This is an indication that the problems facing the Roma minority have yet to be addressed at their core".

On 25 July 2013, the United States Mission to the Organization for Security and Cooperation in Europe Chargé d'Affaires Gary Robbins, said in a statement that United States government was concerned about "several recent reports of incidents that highlight the need for decisive, broad-based action by participating States to address both the causes and manifestations of anti-Roma sentiment". He also said that the USMOSCO joins Office for Democratic Institutions and Human Rights director Janez Lenarčič's condemnation of Czech law enforcement's failure to prevent further escalations of violence.

On 4 August 2013, German newspaper Die Welt wrote that the Anti-Roma protests had become a sort of "Czech national sport" due to the fact that both political radicals and ordinary citizens had been participating in them.

CBC News described the situation in the Czech Republic as the "Wild East".

On 7 October 2013, the Romedia Foundation, a Romani non-governmental organization based in Budapest, that the protests in the last two months "have been solely addressed towards the exclusion and eradication of Roma people" and that the protests and rallies had a "considerable, visible increase in followers of the neo-Nazi and extremist mentalities" since the 2011 protests.

According to Council of Europe Commissioner for Human Rights Nils Muižnieks, 22 Roma had been physically attacked in 2013.

On 4 April 2014, European Network Against Racism reported that the "frequency and size" of anti-Roma marches and protests in the Czech Republic surged in 2013 compared to previous years.
