= Helsinki (disambiguation) =

Helsinki is a city in Finland

Helsinki may also refer to:

- Helsinki (parliamentary electoral district)
- Helsinki (Taivassalo), a small village in Taivassalo municipality
- Hellsinki, a 2000 Finnish film
- "Helsinki", an episode of the television series Veep
- Mirko Dragić (Helsinki), a character in the television series Money Heist

== See also ==
- Helsinki Commission (disambiguation)
- Helsinki Group (disambiguation)
