= Vreme =

Serbian news magazine

- Vreme cover, 29 October 2026
- Editor-in-chief: Filip Švarm
- Categories: News magazine
- First issue: 29 October 1990
- Country: Serbia
- Based in: Belgrade
- Language: Serbian
- Website: http://www.vreme.com
- ISSN: 0353-8028

Vreme (Serbian for 'Time') is a liberal weekly news magazine based in Belgrade, Serbia. Since its founding, its majority owner has been lawyer Boris S. Popović, the son of Serbian politician Vesna Pešić and liberal lawyer and human rights activist Srđa Popović.

== History ==
In 1990, dissatisfied with the media climate in SR Serbia, SFR Yugoslavia's largest constituent unit, a group of liberal Serbian intellectuals, including prominent lawyer Srđa Popović, decided to start a weekly news magazine. Following a seven-month preparation throughout the year, Vreme was launched with its first issue coming out on 29 October 1990, a little over a month before the 1990 general election in SR Serbia as the entire country of SFR Yugoslavia was transforming its governance from a one-party system under the Yugoslav Communist League (SKJ) to a multi-party one.

Most of Vreme's original staff were journalists from Politika and NIN. It characterizes itself as "a magazine without lies, hatred, or prejudice" and opposed nationalistic mobilization for the Yugoslav wars. During Slobodan Milošević's reign, Vreme was one of a handful of independent Serbian media outlets which resisted his influence and control and tried to counterbalance nationalist rhetoric. In May 1992, it published articles on the destruction of cities in Bosnia and Croatia, and in November 1992 described attacks on cultural heritage sites (by both Serb and non-Serb forces). Its design is modeled after its U.S. counterparts Time and Newsweek.

In 1993, 30,000 copies were produced weekly with a quarter of its sales abroad. Vreme has established a reputation as one of the most reliable media sources of the former Yugoslavia and its writers have been largely cited by international media.

== See also ==
- Yutel
- Monitor
