= 1968 student demonstrations in Yugoslavia =

Student protests

- Part of the Protests of 1968 and the Cold War
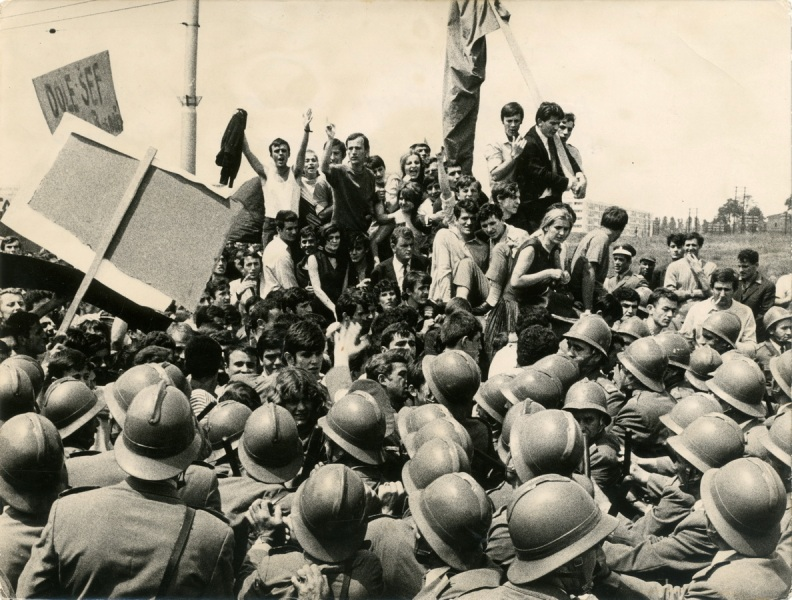
- Protests in Belgrade, 1968
- Date: 2–9 June 1968
- Location: Yugoslavia
- Caused by: High unemployment Economic reforms
- Methods: Wildcat strikes, general strikes
- Result: Protest suppressed: Mass firing of university professors with anti-communist views; Purge of anti-communists in the League of Communists of Yugoslavia; Tito gives into some of the student's demands; Imprisonment of protest leaders

Parties
Students	Yugoslavia

Lead figures
Vladimir Mijanović; Lazar Stojanović	(Socialist Federal Republic of Yugoslavia) Josip Broz Tito

Casualties and losses
Hundreds wounded Many imprisoned	Unknown

Student protests were held in Belgrade, Yugoslavia, as the first mass protest in Yugoslavia after World War II. Protests then also erupted in some of the capitals of the other Yugoslav republics – Sarajevo, Zagreb and Ljubljana – but they were smaller and shorter-lasting than those in Belgrade.

== History ==
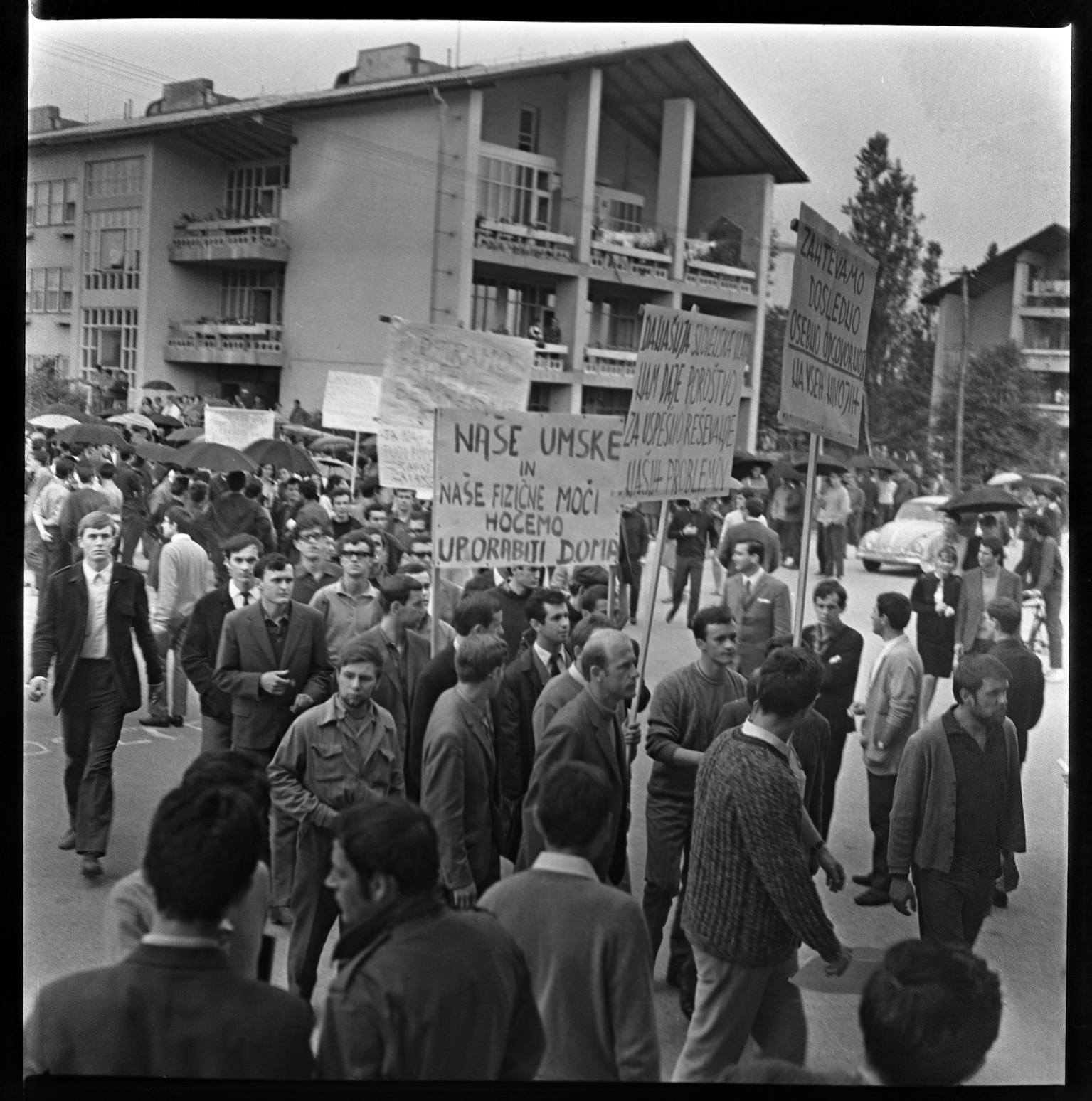
Student protesters in Ljubljana

On the night of 2 June 1968, students of the Belgrade University initiated a seven-day strike. The police responded by beating the student protestors and banning all public gatherings. Ignoring the ban, the student protestors then gathered at the Faculty of Philosophy, held debates and speeches on social justice, and distributed copies of the banned magazine Student. Students also protested against economic reforms, which led to high unemployment and workers leaving the country and finding work elsewhere. In Ljubljana, more than 5000 people gathered on Prešern square. They were violently dispersed by police units from Croatia using batons, tear gas and water canons. Hundreds were injured. Leading public figures, including film director Dušan Makavejev, stage actor Stevo Žigon, poet Desanka Maksimović, and numerous university professors, lent their support to the protests and in so doing found themselves running into problems in their careers because of their connections to the protests.

President Josip Broz Tito gave a televised speech on June 9, which ultimately led to the cessation of the protests, as he conceded that the "students are right" and gave in to some of their demands. However, in the years that followed, he retaliated against the leaders of the protests by imprisoning students (Vladimir Mijanović, Milan Nikolić, Pavluško Imširović, Lazar Stojanović and others) and by firing critical professors from university positions and Communist party posts.

== See also ==
- Belgrade Six
- The Elusive Summer of '68
- Lipanjska gibanja
- New class
- Praxis School

== Sources ==
- "Down with the Red Bourgeoisie of Yugoslavia: An Analysis of the June Students' Insurrection in Belgrade, Yugoslavia" (November 1968). Black & Red. No. 3.
- Fredy Perlman (1969). "Birth of a Revolutionary Movement in Yugoslavia".
- D. Plamenic (March–April 1969). "Belgrade Student Insurrection". New Left Review. No. 54.
- Madigan Fichter (2016). "Yugoslav Protest: Student Rebellion in Belgrade, Zagreb, and Sarajevo in 1968". Slavic Review. 75 (1): 99–121. doi:10.5612/slavicreview.75.1.99.
