= Mark Almond =

British writer and lecturer (born 1958)

- Born: 1958 (age 67–68)
- Education: Masters Degree
- Occupation: Writer

Mark Almond (born 1958) is a British author, and was a lecturer in Modern History at Oriel College, Oxford.

== Education ==
Almond holds a master's degree (M.A.), and was the Chair of the British Helsinki Human Rights Group (which despite its name was not affiliated with the Helsinki Committee for Human Rights).

== Career ==
He served as an election observer under the aegis of the BHHRG, a group that has been accused of producing fraudulent reports on elections in countries such as Georgia and Ukraine. Almond took part in these reports. Almond has been critical of what he characterizes as Western interference with democracy, such as the activities of George Soros.

His research interests lie in 19th century and 20th century Central-Eastern Europe; Almond has written a biography of Nicolae and Elena Ceaușescu, a study of Albanian migration, and a study of the Bosnian War in its historical context. He has recently been teaching a course on 18th Century France, focusing on the writings of Alexis de Tocqueville.

As of 2012, Almond was delivering lectures on European History in Bilkent University in Turkey. Almond also writes articles for national papers.

== Publications ==
- Revolution: 500 Years of Struggle for Change (London, 1996). ISBN 1-899883-73-8
- Europe's backyard war: the war in the Balkans (London: Heinemann, 1994). ISBN 0-434-00003-5
- National pacifism: Germany's new temptation (London: Alliance Publishers, 1991). ISBN 0-907967-26-4
- Decline without fall: Romania under Ceausescu (London: Alliance Publishers for the Institute for European Defence & Strategic Studies, 1988). ISBN 0-907967-96-5
