= British Helsinki Human Rights Group =

The British Helsinki Human Rights Group (BHHRG) was an Oxford-based non-governmental organization which claimed to monitor human rights in the 56 participating States of the Organization for Security and Co-operation in Europe (OSCE). Despite its name, the organisation was not affiliated to the Helsinki Committee for Human Rights. BHHRG was critical of what it characterized as Western interference in imposing democracy, and claimed to support the right of political independence from the west of a number of Communist and post-Communist regimes, as well as of a number of African dictators.

The group also used the name OSCEwatch, indicating that it saw part of its mission as scrutinising the activities of the OSCE. The OSCEwatch and BHHRG websites are identical, and both websites openly refer to each other.

The British Charity Commission removed the group's listing in September 2010, noting "Ceased to exist".

== Membership and funding ==
The BHHRG was founded in 1992. It was run from the Oxford home of historian Professor Norman Stone, who on occasion took part in BHHRG activities, and was co-founded by his wife Christine Stone and fellow Oxford historian Mark Almond (who was also its chairman). Its trustees comprised Mark Almond, Anthony Daniels (who writes for The Daily Telegraph under the pseudonym Theodore Dalrymple), John Laughland, Christine Stone and Mary Walsh. Almond, Daniels, Laughland and Stone were members of Britain's conservative intelligentsia and regular contributors to British newspapers. Chad Nagle, an American lawyer who frequently contributes to the website antiwar.com, was also associated with the group. Noel Malcolm, a historian of early modern Britain and Europe who in the 1990s and early 2000s wrote books on aspects of Balkan history, appeared on a 1994 list of founders and spoke on its behalf in 1999 but later apparently left the group.

The BHHRG was not an "official" Helsinki Committee, as it was not affiliated with the Helsinki Committees' umbrella organisation, the then International Helsinki Federation (IHF). The United Kingdom's representative in the IHF was the British Helsinki Subcommittee of the Parliamentary Human Rights Group, established in 1976. This led to the BHHRG being mistakenly labelled the British Helsinki Committee, which prompted the British Helsinki Subcommittee to ask visitors to its website to

"PLEASE NOTE that the so-called British Helsinki Group is NOT affiliated with the IHF" .

For its part, the BHHRG website said nothing on the subject.

The membership, management and funding of the BHHRG were somewhat obscure. These aspects did not appear to be discussed at all on its website, and the details of its trustees were given only in its legally required returns to the UK's Charity Commission. Its published accounts stated that it received £417,332 in income between 1997–2003 and spent £449,086 in the same period. The organisation later appeared to fall on hard times, with its funding falling by nearly 99% after 2001. A possible reason was suggested by The Economist, which reported in 2004 that

"the group lost almost all its supporters when it threw its weight behind people like Mr Milošević."

The identity of its backers was also unclear. Still with them in 1999, Noel Malcolm explained that the group does not disclose its donors

"for obvious reason[s]: they [critics] would then start to campaign [against the group] with the financial backers."

Only a few contributors were known by name. Material that the BHHRG issued in 1992 cited the UKIP (then-Tory) peer Lord Pearson of Rannoch and the David and Lucile Packard Foundation as donors. The BHHRG's "About Us" page stated that it "does not receive funding from any government" but, according to a Foreign Office source, it received money from the Foreign and Commonwealth Office for an election observer mission in 1995. The source said funding was cut off because they found the group prejudiced, partial and unreliable.

It subsequently received no funding from this source and its advocates said this proved the group was independent of governments.

== Activities ==
The BHHRG website claimed that the main activities of the Group included:

- Monitoring the conduct of elections in OSCE member states.
- Examining issues relating to press freedom and freedom of speech
- Reporting on conditions in prisons and psychiatric institutions
- Covering asylum and immigration issues

The BHHRG published reports from first-hand observers, concentrating on election monitoring in central and eastern Europe, as well as publishing frequent unsigned commentaries (just like the Economist does) about events in the region. A common theme in many of its publications was a critical view of Western "meddling in the internal affairs" of central and east European countries, notably the former Federal Republic of Yugoslavia and Belarus.

Among its achievements the BHHRG's website claimed:

- 1992 – BHHRG was the first NGO to expose the human rights situation in the former Soviet republic of Georgia
- 1993 – BHHRG exposure of fraud in the conduct of Russia's constitutional referendum was later admitted by the authorities.
- 1996 – BHHRG report of election fraud in Armenia's presidential election was only acknowledged in 1998
- 1998 – BHHRG predicted war in Kosovo in late February (after US envoy Robert Gelbard called the Kosovo Albanian separatist KLA a 'terrorist group')
- 1999 – BHHRG was the first human rights group to visit the notorious Sangatte camp for asylum seekers in France
- 2001 – BHHRG exposed the scandal of trafficking in women from Moldova

== Most controversial aspects ==
The media connections of some of BHHRG members enabled it to propagate its views through a number of major newspapers in Britain and the US. Yet it became famous only when it publicly denounced what were widely perceived as democratic movements against authoritarian former Communist rulers.

Among actions critics of the BHHRG find ill-advised:

- The BHHRG based part of a Latvia report on an interview with Alfreds Rubiks, the Communist who led the "National Salvation Committee" which would have co-ordinated repression had the coup against Gorbachev not failed in 1991.
- In March 1997, BHHRG member Anthony Daniels wrote an article for the Sunday Telegraph: "The Media Back the Communists as Usual", in which he claimed that British journalists Miranda Vickers and James Pettifer, were "supporters of the former Stalinist regime of the late Enver Hoxha", the former communist dictator of Albania. They sued the paper for libel and settled out of court, with the Telegraph paying £10,000 to each and printing an apology.
- Another leading member, Christine Stone, has also written approvingly of Zimbabwe's Robert Mugabe.

Other statements by the BHHRG included:

- denouncing as a "coup d'état" staged by his former protégés the November 2003 "Rose Revolution" in Georgia which deposed president Eduard Shevardnadze (this is cited by them as an example of how the Western powers use and then dispose of their agents in the so-called Euro-Atlantic space).
- claiming that the International Criminal Tribunal for the Former Yugoslavia should not be prosecuting Slobodan Milošević for his alleged crimes because they find fault with its procedures and
- that NATO should be prosecuted instead for bombing Yugoslavia on behalf of Kosovo Albanian separatists.
- claiming that elections in Belarus "met democratic standards", in opposition to the OSCE's contrary claim, and claiming that the OCSE did not actually observe the elections.
- that Latvia was not occupied by the Soviet Union but was "incorporated" into the USSR,
- that the Romani people of the Czech Republic do not suffer racism as generally reported,
- that Russian President Vladimir Putin and the Russian authorities acted correctly in the Beslan hostage crisis.
- that concern for the massacres in the Sudan was driven by a lust for oil, and
- that the second round of the 2004 Ukrainian presidential election was "generally representative of genuine popular will" and not falsified by the authorities, so that the December rerun election was illegitimate.

John Laughland (who said that reports of mass graves in Iraq were exaggerated for political purposes) characterised some supporters of Ukraine's Viktor Yushchenko as "neo-Nazis" and many of those backing him on the streets as "druggy skinheads from Lvov" whereas principal elements of the Jewish community supported Yushchenko.

These last claims prompted the publication of well-documented articles "exposing" the BHHRG's exploits. The British weekly The Economist published "Yanukovich's friends: A human-rights group that defends dictators". The daily Guardian published "PR man to Europe's nastiest regimes", written by David Aaronovitch, to which John Laughland, the subject of the article, objected, saying that it was "almost identical to" an article on a web site carrying "virulently antisemitic articles about the Jewish proclivity for rape, and about how the gas chambers at Auschwitz could not have existed". The controversy attracted many comments on the internet. The BHHRG's advocates reply by quoting Aleksandr Tsinker, "Head of the Observer Mission from the Institute for East European and CIS Nations" — an organization publicly known for nothing else — as saying that the Ukrainian election "was a free expression of the voters' will".

Some of the BHHRG's statements were favorably quoted by the isolationist right in the US, by opponents of US foreign policy, as well as governments regarded by Western authorities as authoritarian and criminal, such as that of Belarus.

Its critics accused the BHHRG of taking a predetermined ideological line while observing elections. A British Foreign Office official quoted by Jeremy Druker said of them:

"It was very clear that they had their own agenda. They also monitored the elections in Georgia in 1995, and it would appear Almond and his people had made up their minds about the election report even before the election had taken place. People at the time were not happy with the way that they monitored the election… they didn't set out in an impartial spirit."

The BHHRG was almost always more critical of social-democratic than nationalist rulers. The Economist characterises the BHHRG's opinion as "an intense dislike of liberal internationalism." Tom Palmer of the libertarian Cato Institute summarizes their position as being that

the mass movements to unseat [governments in eastern Europe] are nothing but stooges for the west, out to integrate those brave little authoritarian-socialist regimes into the 'New World Order,' privatize their state industries, and strip them of their assets.

The BHHRG's commentaries indeed alleged that Western governments and international organisations were seeking to implement a "New World Order" in central and eastern Europe. Its supporters claimed that the organisation exposes matters which Western governments and biased international organisations such as the UN and the OSCE had rather remained unknown.

For instance, it claimed it denounced human rights abuses committed in Georgia while these were ignored by the OSCE and the Council of Europe. Mark Almond, who has written on Balkan matters, criticised the NATO bombing of Yugoslavia on behalf of Albanian separatists in Kosovo as a "violation of international law" which resulted in "cultural genocide" against Serbs. As self-proclaimed monitors of Human Rights in the countries concerned, they accused other intergovernmental organisations of being undemocratic, unelected, unaccountable, non-transparent meddlers in their internal affairs.

The OSCE criticized the BHHRG for letting its journalists pose as impartial election monitors while publishing partisan polemics in newspapers, and for relying on short-term observer missions with a handful of people, an approach the OSCE abandoned as open to manipulation in 1996. (The OSCE now uses large-scale long-term missions of four to six weeks with dozens of experts and hundreds of observers.) The BHHRG dismissed the OSCE's position as an attempt to stifle legitimate criticism and independent reporting.

== Name issues ==
The BHHRG was also denounced for failing to mention that it enjoyed no recognition from the International Helsinki Federation, but was at odds with other organizations with similar names, at least since 1996. The International Helsinki Federation (IHF) felt the need to issue a public statement disclaiming any connection with the group. The Greek National Committee of the said Federation, which has been effective throughout the Balkans, also published a press release to denounce what it felt was the BHHRG's impostures, while others accused it of "nam[ing] itself so as to usurp the prestige of its elder". Monika Horaková, a Roma member of the Czech parliament, said in an open letter condemning a BHHRG's report in 1999:

"I had thought that the Helsinki Group was a non-partisan body interested in exposing and helping to solve human rights abuses in the world. This report caused me to question my previously held beliefs. However, I have since learned that the BHHRG has no connection to the International Helsinki Federation for Human Rights in Vienna. It is a disgrace that the BHHRG is using the good Helsinki name to mislead the public into thinking that their racist propaganda is somehow affiliated with the well-respected Helsinki Group."

Supporters of the BHHRG replied that the name "Helsinki" is not trademarked anywhere and no official imprimatur is needed for any group wishing to monitor the implementation of the Helsinki Accords. They noted that the European Commission established a "Helsinki Group on Women and Science" in Helsinki in 1999, with no connection with the monitoring of Helsinki Accords.

== Links and references ==
=== Articles by the BHHRG ===
- British Helsinki Human Rights Group official website
- Archive of BHHRG reports
- BHHRG 1992 report exposing torture in Shevardnadze's Georgia
- BHHRG 1999 report on Romani in the Czech Republic
- BHHRG opinion piece regarding Vladimir Putin,23 September 2004 .
  - reply in letters page, The Guardian (UK), 2 December 2004

=== Articles by others about the BHHRG ===
- International Helsinki Federation's statement on the status of the BHHRG.
- "'Helsinki' Doesn't Guarantee Faithfulness To Human Rights", Greek Helsinki Monitor, 3 August 1997.
- "War of the Monitors", Jeremy Druker, Transitions Magazine, 15 February 1999.
- criticism of 1999 report on Roma in Czech, by a member of the European Roma Rights Center.
- "PR man to Europe's nastiest regimes", The Guardian (UK), 30 November 2004.
- "Yanukovich's friends: A human-rights group that defends dictators", The Economist (UK), 2 December 2004.
- "Something Is Rotting at the Periphery of the Libertarian Movement.....", Tom Palmer, 11 December 2004.
