= Andranik Migranyan =

Armenian-born Russian political sicentist (born 1949)

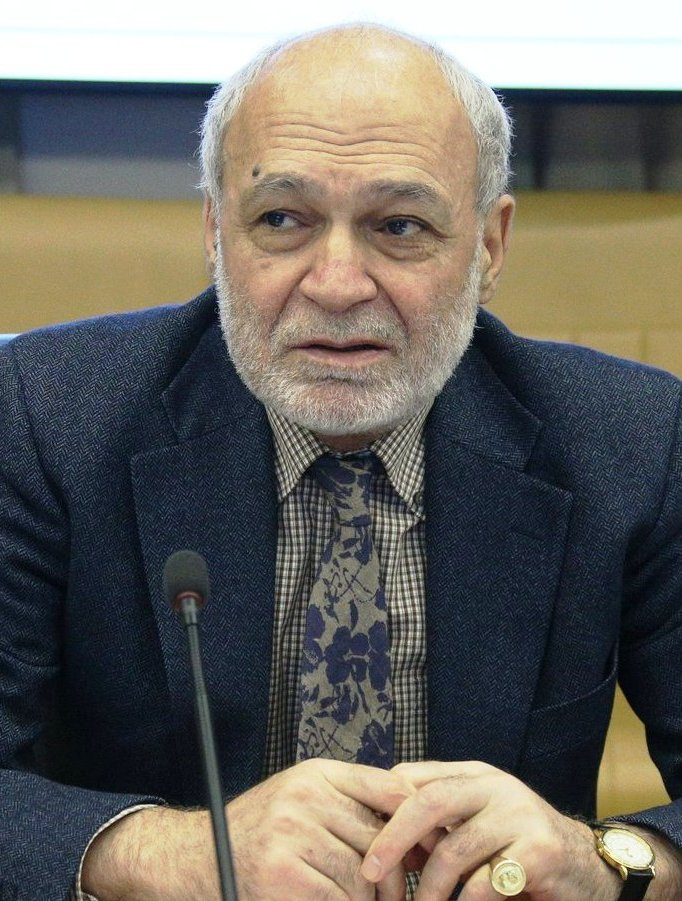
Andranik Migranyan (2021)

Andranik Migranyan (Armenian: Անդռանիկ Միգռանյան; Russian: Андраник Мигранян; born 10 February 1949 in Yerevan, Armenia) is an Armenian-born Russian political scientist, who works as a professor at the Moscow State Institute of International Relations.

== Academy ==
He holds a PhD degree (1978) from the Institute of International Labor Movement, Soviet Academy of Sciences, Moscow. Andranik Migranyan has been a visiting fellow at Harriman Institute, Columbia University; San Diego State University. He is an author of a number of articles, books, hundreds of publications.

== Advisor ==
During the 1990s he was an advisor to Boris Yeltsin.

From 1993 till 2000 he was a Member of the Presidential Council of the Russian Federation.

In 1994 served as Chief Advisor to the Committee on CIS Problems in the Russian Parliament (Duma).

From 2008 to 2015 he was the director of the Institute for Democracy and Cooperation, New York, founded in 2007.

== Views ==
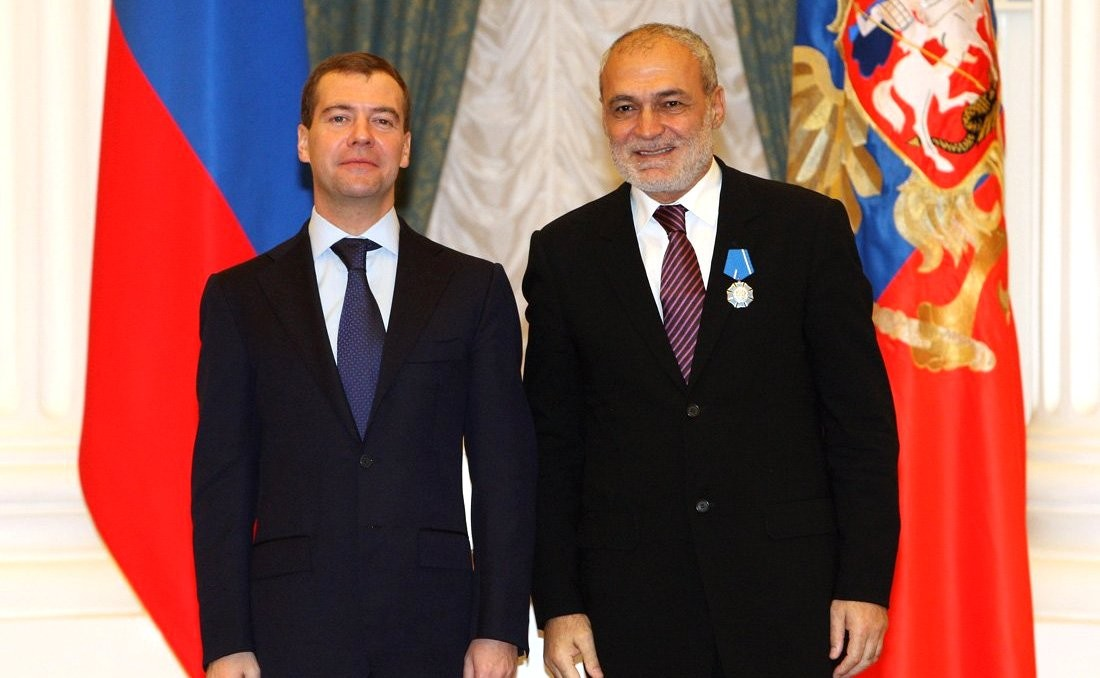
Presentation of the Order of Honour with President Dmitry Medvedev, 2 November 2009

In 2011, during the Libyan Civil War he said that there was a chance that Muammar Gaddafi will be imprisoned rather than sent out of the country like it happened in Egypt.

In 2014, he argued with Andrey Zubov about the role of Hitler and the Annexation of Crimea by the Russian Federation, and in an Izvestia article he stated that there was a difference between Hitler before 1939 and Hitler after 1939, and that Hitler without a single drop of blood has united Germany with Austria, and Sudetenland and Memel to Germany, something what Otto von Bismarck was unable to do.

Migranyan has frequently commented on politics in Armenia. In 2013, he said that he admires Raffi Hovannisian, but disagreed that he would make a good politician. He is also a vocal critic of Armenian Prime Minister Nikol Pashinyan. During the 2018 Armenian Revolution, he strongly condemned Pashinyan and his supporters as "dirt" (охлосом, чернью, и мразью).
