= Vladimir Mijanović =

Serbian human rights activist (1946–2021)

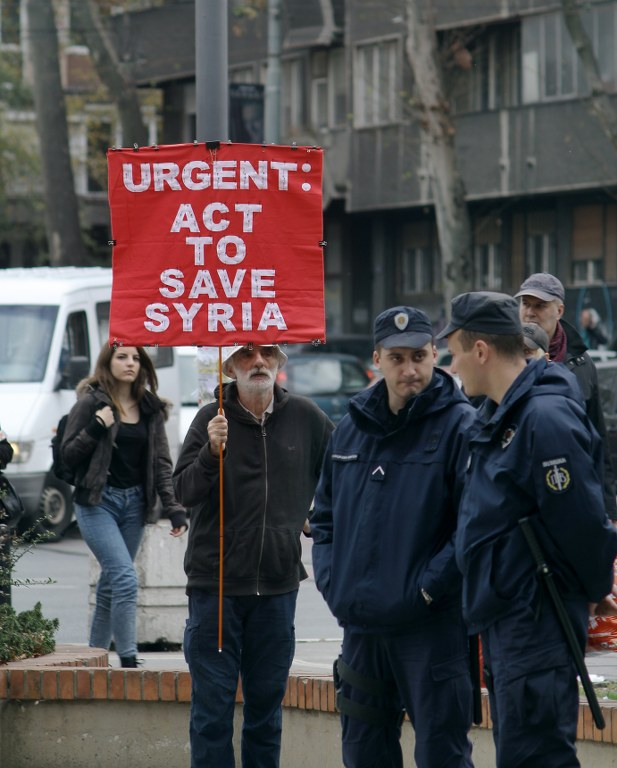
- Born: August 15, 1946; Mosko, Trebinje, FPR Yugoslavia
- Died: May 6, 2021 (aged 74); Belgrade, Serbia
- Education: Belgrade University
- Known for: 1968 student demonstrations in Yugoslavia, activism

Vladimir Mijanović (15 August 1946 – 6 May 2021), also known as Vlada “Revolucija” (Revolution), was a Serbian human rights activist and leader of 1968 student demonstrations in Yugoslavia.

== Biography ==
Vladimir Mijanović was born in 1946 in Mosko near Trebinje. He studied sociology at the University of Belgrade Faculty of Philosophy. During his studies, he participated in the protests against the Vietnam War in 1966 in Belgrade.

As president of the Faculty Board of the Student Union, he became one of the leaders of 1968 student demonstrations, especially because of his extraordinary organizational skills. On 3 June 1968 he led a protest rally from the student campus, occupying the University Rectorate, where students founded the “Karl Marx Red University” and proclaimed a general strike until their requirements are fulfilled.

Because of his participation in the protest, he was expelled from the university, proclaimed a dissident and a disturber of constitutional order, which led to his arrest in July 1970. He was accused of organizing the hunger strike of students of the Faculty of Philosophy in a show of solidarity with Kakanj miners, printing a satirical magazine called “Frontisterion”, active involvement in defense of periodicals that were repressed at the time (“Student”, “Susret”, “Vidici”) and organizing a protest against the War in Cambodia. His arrest and sentence to 20 months in prison (later commuted to 12 months) caused a two-week student strike and reactions of foreign intellectuals, including Noam Chomsky who described Mijanović as “the hope and the conscience of the Yugoslav revolution”.

He was one of the founders of the dissident Free University in 1976, even the founding meeting was held in his apartment. At the time, this was the only dissident organization in Yugoslavia. Because of this he was again arrested in 1984, with a group of five other intellectuals, who became famous as the “Belgrade Six”, and accused of “counter-revolutionary activities”, even though the accusations were later dismissed. The process against the “Belgrade Six” led to an equally strong reaction from around the world, including a petition of 130 prominent Western public figures that was submitted to Yugoslav Presidency because of the process.

As the régime's persona non grata, Mijanović was systematically deprived of opportunities for work, his civil liberties were limited, and his passport was taken away. When, at the urging of Zoran Radmilović, he got work as a background actor in the series “Više od igre” (“More than a game”) in 1976, all shots in which he appeared were cut during editing.

In 1986, Mijanović left Yugoslavia for the United States, where he lived with his wife and two children, earning a livelihood by doing manual labor; he also worked as a taxi driver for some time. Even though he did not have necessary documents for permanent residence in the US, he participated in protests of various leftist movements, including anti-war movements, and movements for the abolition of death penalty.

Upon his return to Serbia in 2006 he lived modestly and out of the public eye, but he still actively participated in protests and marches in defense of human rights, including protests against evictions and bailiffs, ecological protests against cutting down trees, against small-scale hydropower plants and against genetically modified organisms. He designed and painted many hundreds of banners that were carried on numerous protests, displayed on barricades in Kosovo and Metohija, and were even a subject of a dedicated exhibition in France. He died in Belgrade.

Since 1966 and throughout his life many have noted that Vladimir Mijanović had, in line with his own individual and moral principles, pursued the fight against tyranny, for human rights, human dignity and freedom, and his personal example made him into teacher of the next generation of activists.
