= Olja Ivanjicki =

Serbian painter, sculptor and poet

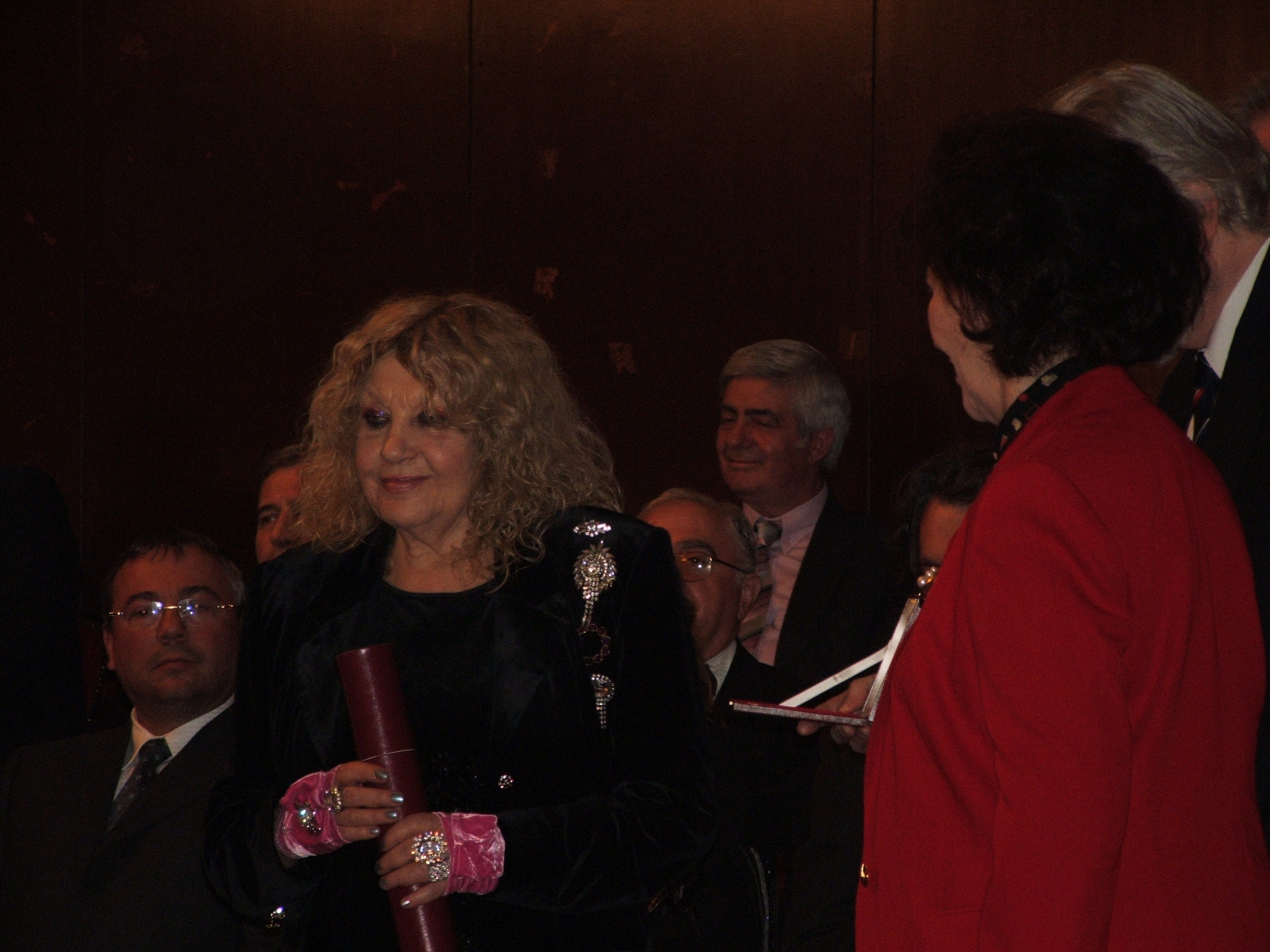
- Olja Ivanjicki receiving Zlatni Beočug Award
- Born: 10 May 1931; Pančevo, Kingdom of Yugoslavia
- Died: 24 June 2009 (aged 78); Belgrade, Serbia
- Occupation: Artist

Olja (Olga) Ivanjicki (Serbian Cyrillic: Оља Ивањицки; 10 May 1931, in Pančevo – 24 June 2009, in Belgrade) was a Serbian painter, sculptor and poet.

== Life, work and awards ==
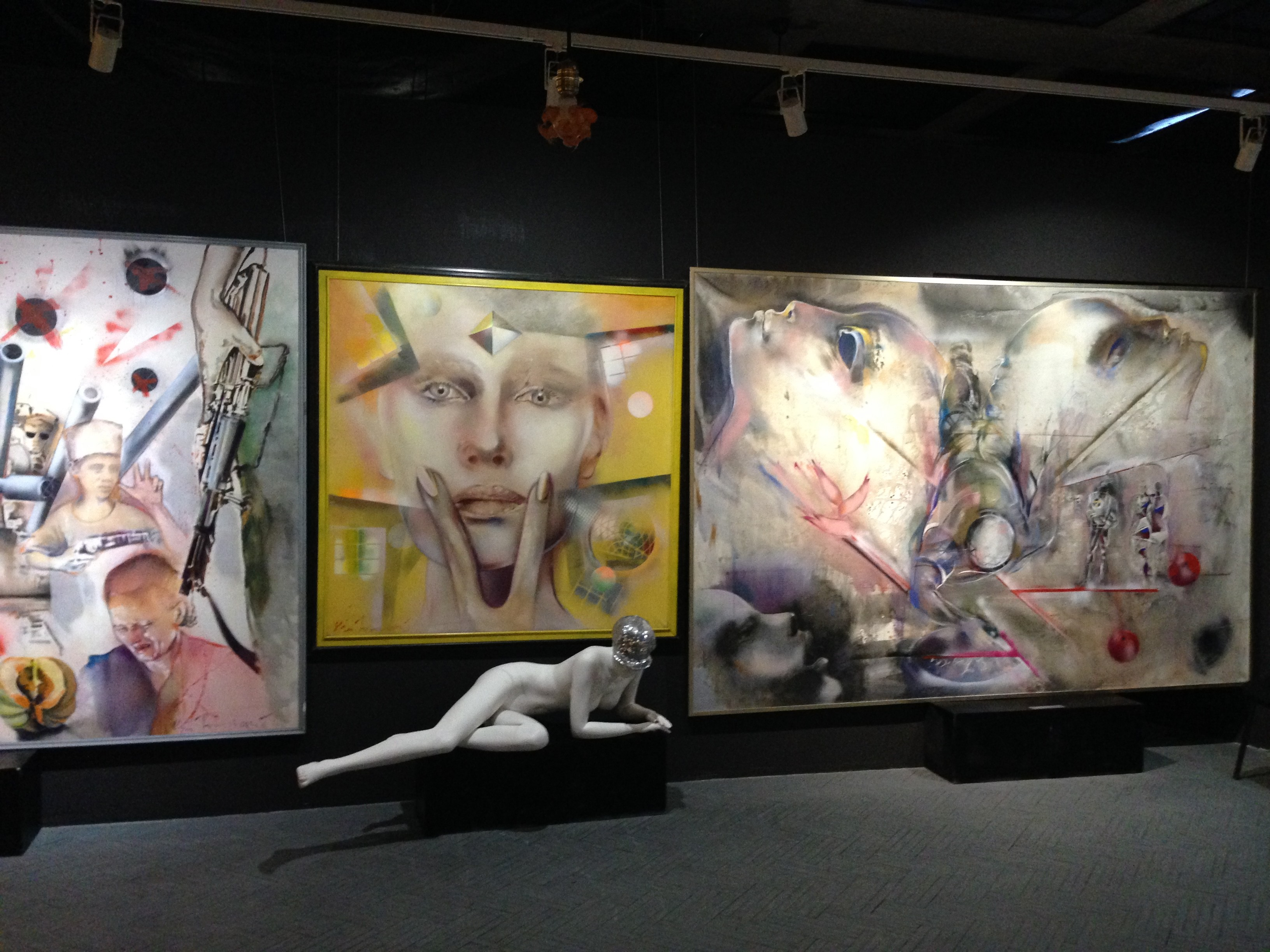
Ivanjicki's Legacy at Historical Museum of Serbia, 2017

Olga Ivanjicki, the daughter of Russian emigrants was born in Pančevo, Danube Banovina. She studied at the Academy of Fine Arts in Belgrade, graduated in 1957, and in the same year she was the only woman among the founders of MEDIALA Belgrade, an art group of painters, writers and architects such as Leonid Šejka, Vladimir Veličković, Ljubomir Popović, Miodrag Đurić. In 1962, she received a scholarship of the Ford Foundation to pursue her art studies in the United States, and in 1978 she was a selected artist of the Fulbright program Artist in Residence at the Rhode Island School of Design.

She had over ninety individual exhibitions and participated in numerous national and international group exhibitions. Ivanjicki’s painting was influenced by Symbolism, Surrealism, Pop art and Fantastic art. In the course of her career, the artist received the Vuk Lifetime Achievement Award (Vukova nagrada, 1988), the Seventh of July Award (Sedmojulska nagrada, 1988) and the Karić Award.

== Bibliography (selection) ==
- Večni uslov – poezija (Eternal Condition - Poetry), Novosti, Belgrade 2008, ISBN 978-86-7446-134-1.
- Painting the Future, Philip Wilson Publishers, London 2009, ISBN 978-0-85667-663-5.
