= Helsinki Foundation for Human Rights =

Name used by several human rights organisations

The name Helsinki Foundation for Human Rights is used by non-governmental organizations in several countries that were established under the now-defunct International Helsinki Federation for Human Rights.

The organizations include:

- Helsinki Foundation for Human Rights (Poland)
- Turkmen Helsinki Foundation for Human Rights, established in 2003 in Varna, Bulgaria, to monitor human rights in Turkmenistan
- Czech Helsinki Committee
- Greek Helsinki Monitor
