= Vesna Pešić =

Serbian politician and sociologist

PhD Vesna Pešić Весна Пешић
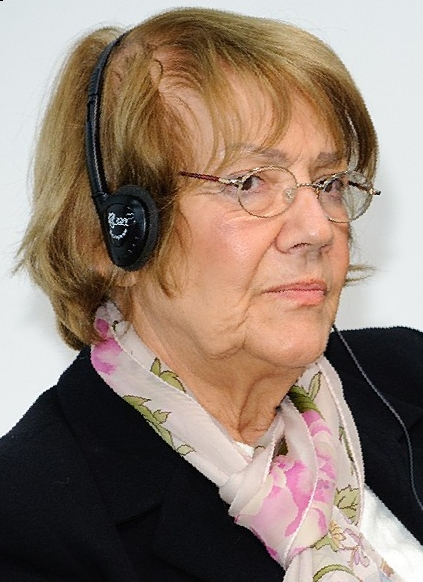

Member of Parliament
- In office 2007–2012

Yugoslav Ambassador to Mexico
- In office 2001–2005

Party founder and Leader of Civic Alliance of Serbia
- In office 1992–1999
- Succeeded by: Goran Svilanović

Personal details
- Born: May 6, 1940 (age 86) Grocka, Yugoslavia (now Serbia)
- Party: Civic Alliance of Serbia (1992–1999); Liberal Democratic Party (2007–2011)
- Education: University of Belgrade

Vesna Pešić (Serbian Cyrillic: Весна Пешић, pronounced [ʋêsna pêʃit͜ɕ]; born May 6, 1940) is a Serbian politician and sociologist.

In February 2012, Vesna Pešić announced she would leave politics after parliamentary elections on 6 May 2012.

== Biography ==
In the early 1970s Pešić became the member of the Intellectuals' Movement for the Defense and Protection of Human Rights and Freedoms, popularly known as the “Belgrade opposition”. In 1982, she was arrested and imprisoned for organizing the protests against the arrest of a group of the University of Belgrade students.

Pešić was a founder member of the Yugoslav Helsinki Committee (1985), the Association for the Yugoslav Democratic Initiative (1989), the Yugoslav European Movement (1991) and the Centre for Antiwar Action (1991). From 1992 till 1999 she was the president of the Civic Alliance of Serbia, and from 1993 until 1997 she was one of the leaders of the Coalition Zajedno (Together), with Vuk Drašković's Serbian Renewal Movement and Zoran Đinđić's Democratic Party.

It is worth a mention that Centre for Antiwar Action is organization largely supported by the National Endowment for Democracy, United States government institution.

Her many honors include the Award for Democracy of the U.S. National Foundation for Democracy (1993), the W. Averell Harriman Award of the U.S. National Institute for Democracy (1997) from Washington, D.C., United States and the Andrei Sakharov Award from the Norwegian Helsinki Committee and the Sakharov Foundation for Freedom (1997). She is praised as '"contributor in developing democracy and civil society"' from Institute of Peace, founded by United States Congress.

Pešić served as national Ambassador to Mexico from 2001 to 2005, firstly for the Federal Republic of Yugoslavia, and then for its successor, Serbia and Montenegro.

After the merger of the Civic Alliance of Serbia into the Liberal Democratic Party in 2007, she became the president of the Political Council of the Liberal Democratic Party. Following the disagreement with party leader Čedomir Jovanović, Pešić left Liberal Democratic Party on 7 April 2011.

In May 2008, after parliamentary elections in Serbia, Pešić ironically stated that "if pro-EU camp fails to form a government, elections should be nullified". In addition, in her opinion, any future elections should be prevented.

Pešić was a Member of Serbian Parliament from 1993 to 1997 and from 2007 to 2012.

Pešić is a senior scientific associate of the Institute of Philosophy and Social Theory.

During the parliamentary- and presidential election campaign of 2012. Pešić was the most prominent face of the 'Blank Ballot' campaign, which targeted corruption among the ruling party officials and promoted active boycott of election. Ultimately the campaign helped overthrow the democratic government and introduce an autocratic rule of now president Aleksandar Vučić. Since the 2012 election, civil freedoms and rule of law in Serbia have been gradually deteriorating, causing the Freedom House to label the country as 'Partially free' in 2020.

In 2017, Pešić has signed the Declaration on the Common Language of the Croats, Serbs, Bosniaks and Montenegrins.

== Personal ==
Her sister Stanislava (1941 - 1997) was a famous actress in Yugoslavia. She was married to lawyer Srđa Popović, with whom she has a son named Boris.

Party political offices
New political party	President of the Civic Alliance of Serbia; 1992 – 1999	Succeeded by Goran Svilanović
