= International Day for the Elimination of Racial Discrimination =

International Day of Observance

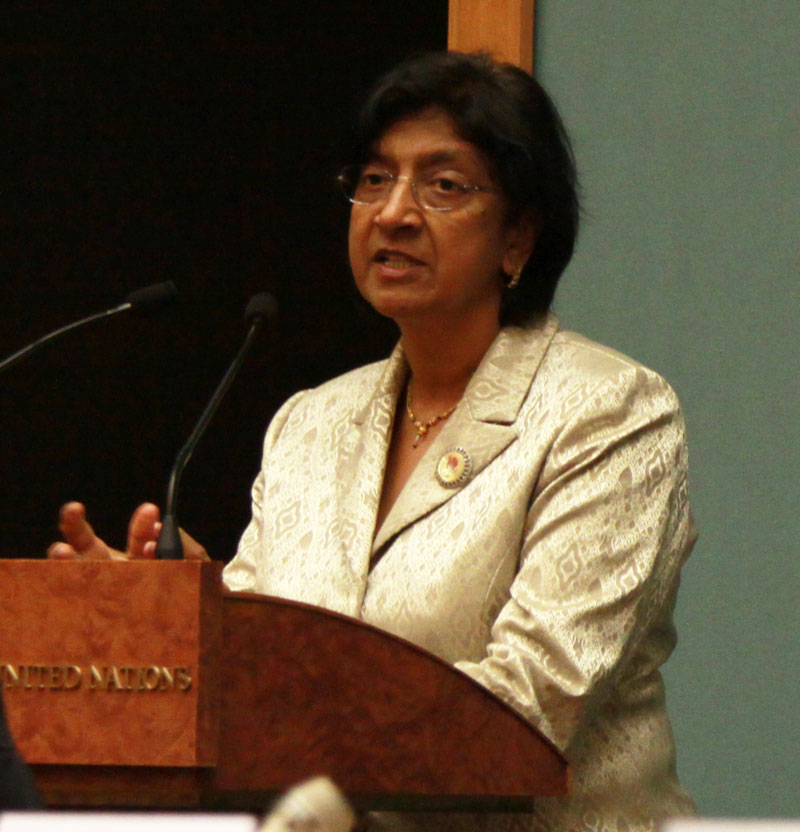
UN High Commissioner for Human Rights Navi Pillay on the day in 2010

The International Day for the Elimination of Racial Discrimination is observed annually on 21 March since declared by the United Nations in 1966. In South Africa, the country in which the event took place that gave rise to the observance, the Sharpeville Massacre, the day is commemorated as Human Rights Day, and is a public holiday.

== Background ==
On 21 March 1960, police opened fire at a peaceful demonstration in Sharpeville, South Africa, against the pass laws. (Note: During the apartheid years, Black South Africans had to carry a kind of internal passport, known as a "pass", which restricted their freedom of movement and residence in the country.) In the event known as the Sharpeville massacre, 69 people were killed and 180 injured.

Proclaiming the day in 1966, the United Nations General Assembly called on the international community to redouble its efforts to eliminate all forms of racial discrimination.

== Human Rights Day in South Africa ==
In South Africa, the day has been commemorated on 21 March each year as a public holiday called Human Rights Day since 1994, when Nelson Mandela was elected president of a new democratic South Africa. The day is regarded as a day of mourning by some, commemorating the lives of those who died to fight for democracy and equal human rights for all in South Africa during apartheid, an institutionally racist system built upon racial discrimination.

On this day, the government asks that "South Africans... reflect on their rights, to protect their rights and the rights of all people from violation, irrespective of race, gender, religion, sexual orientation, whether they are foreign national or not".

== Themes ==
Every year, the International Day for the Elimination of Racial Discrimination is under one specific theme:

- 2010: Disqualify Racism
- 2014: The Role of Leaders in Combatting Racism and Racial Discrimination
- 2015: Learning from tragedies to combat racial discrimination today
- 2017: Racial profiling and incitement to hatred, including in the context of migration
- 2018: Promoting tolerance, inclusion, unity and respect for diversity in the context of combating racial discrimination
- 2019: Mitigating and countering rising nationalist populism and extreme supremacist ideologies
- 2020: Recognition, justice and development: The midterm review of the International Decade for People of African Descent
- 2022: Voices for action against racism
- 2023: 75th anniversary of UDHR - an impetus to combat racism
- 2024: Humanity, non racism
- 2025: 60th anniversary of the International Convention on the Elimination of All Forms of Racial Discrimination

== See also ==
- European Action Week Against Racism, around 21 March
- List of minor secular observances § March
