= John Laughland =

British author and journalist (born 1963)

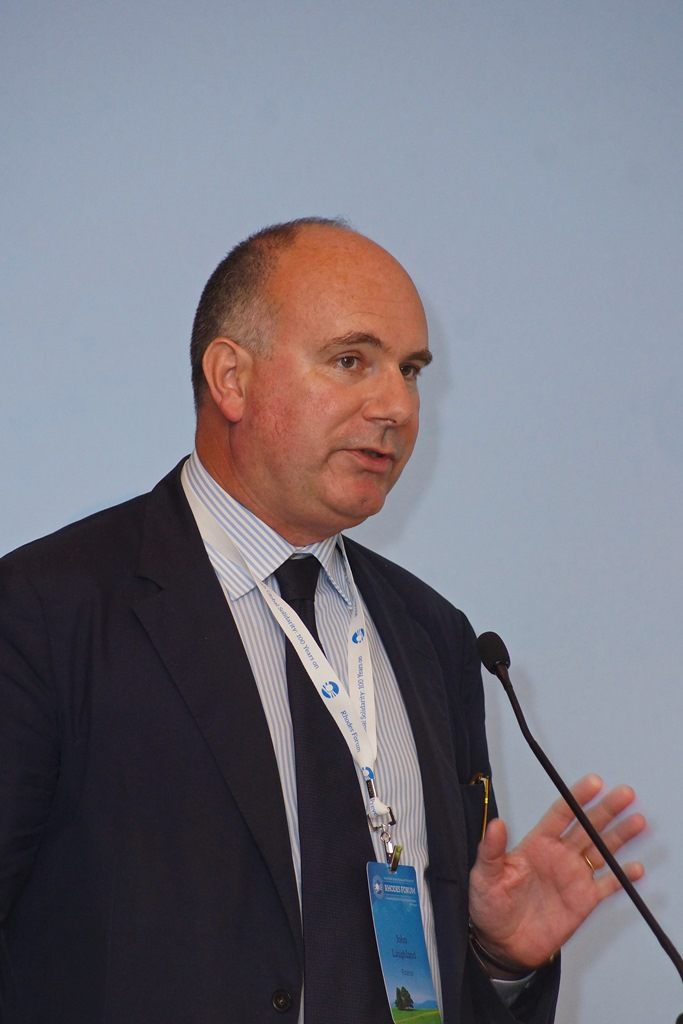
John Laughland at Rhodes Forum 2014

John Laughland (born 6 September 1963) is a British eurosceptic conservative author and journalist who writes on international affairs and political philosophy. He is a university lecturer in France and the director of Forum for Democracy International.

== Career ==
Laughland has a doctorate in philosophy from the University of Oxford, studied at the Ludwig-Maximilians-Universität München, and has been a lecturer at the University of Paris and at the Institut d'Études Politiques de Paris. He also holds the French post-doctoral habilitation degree for his work on sovereignty in international relations.

Laughland has contributed articles to The Guardian, The Mail on Sunday, The Sunday Telegraph, The Spectator, Brussels Journal, The Wall Street Journal, National Review, The American Conservative and Antiwar.com.

He was until 2008 the European director of the European Foundation, a eurosceptic think-tank chaired by Bill Cash MP. Laughland was guest editor of The Monist in January 2007.

From 2008 to 2018, he was Director of Studies at the Institute of Democracy and Cooperation in Paris, which is headed by Natalia Narochnitskaya, a Russian historian and former State Duma deputy. He then worked for Jean-Luc Schaffhauser, a Rassemblement National MEP in the European Parliament until 2019, and thereafter for Derk Jan Eppink, Rob Roos and Rob Rooken, MEPs who were then members of Forum for Democracy.

Since 2021 John Laughland has been on the teaching staff of ICES, the Catholic Institute of the Vendée in La Roche-sur-Yon in Western France, as a lecturer in political science, political philosophy and history. Laughland also works as the director of the international department of Dutch political party Forum voor Democratie under Thierry Baudet. From September 2022 to February 2023 he was Visiting Fellow at the Mathias Corvinus Collegium in Budapest.

== Publications and positions ==
In 1997, he published The Tainted Source: The Undemocratic Origins of the European Idea, a critique in which he contends that the European Union shares some ideological affinity with fascism and communism, notably its rejection of the nation-state. Sir Edward Heath, the former Prime Minister who signed the UK's Treaty of Accession to the Treaty of Rome in 1972, dismissed the book as "preposterous...a hideous distortion of both past and present."

The former UK Minister for Europe, Denis MacShane, has described Laughland as "one of the intellectual architects of Brexit".

Laughland has written extensively on international criminal justice, condemning the International War Crimes Tribunal in The Hague on the grounds that the UN Security Council resolution that created it was illegitimate (the Security Council acted ultra vires by creating it) and because he disagrees with its judicial procedures, for example admissibility of hearsay evidence. He criticises it as a political tribunal and claimed double standards for refusing to open an investigation into whether NATO committed war crimes in Yugoslavia in 1999. Laughland was a strong critic of NATO's intervention in the Kosovo War in 1999, and also opposed the Iraq War.

Laughland has taken a number of controversial positions like criticizing Western support for the opposition to Slobodan Milošević.

Laughland has claimed that Ukraine's presidential candidate Viktor Yushchenko's coalition was linked with "neo-Nazis" in an article for The Guardian in 2004, that his ultimately successful attempts to seize power were backed on the streets by "druggy skinheads from Lviv" in The Spectator; that reports of mass graves in Iraq were being exaggerated for political purposes; and that concern for the massacres in the Sudanese Civil War was driven by oil.

== Bibliography ==
Authored books

- The Death of Politics: France Under Mitterrand (Michael Joseph, London, 1994)
- The Tainted Source, the Undemocratic Origins of the European Idea (Little Brown, London 1997; later translated into French, Spanish, Czech and Polish; now available as an ebook)
- Le tribunal pénal international: Gardien du nouvel ordre mondial (François-Xavier de Guibert, Paris, 2003)
- Travesty: The Trial of Slobodan Milosevic and the Corruption of International Justice (Pluto Press, London, 2007)
- Schelling versus Hegel: from German idealism to Christian metaphysics (Ashgate, 2007)
- A History of Political Trials from Charles I to Charles Taylor (Peter Lang, Oxford, 2nd edition, 2016)
- Europe Deformed (in Russian), (Foundation for Historical Perspective, Moscow, 2016)
- Octav Botnar, A Life (London, OMC Investments, 2018)
- L'Europe de Bruxelles contre l'Europe de Strasbourg, with Jean-Luc Schaffhauser (Paris: Pierre-Guillaume de Roux, 2019).
- Pourquoi combattre ?, directed by Pierre-Yves Rougeyron, Éditions Perspectives Libres, Paris, Janvier 2019, ISBN 979-10-90742-482.
- La grande réinitialisation : analyse du projet de société du Forum Économique Mondial (Lyon, le Cap de l'ISSEP, 2021)

Edited books

- Sovereignty, The Monist 90, I (January 2007).
- Shia Power: Next Target Iran? co-edited with Michel Korinman (Vallentine Mitchell, London, 2007)
- The Long March to the West: Migration in Europe and the Greater Mediterranean Area, co-edited with Michel Korinman (Vallentine Mitchell, London, 2007)
- Israel on Israel co-edited with Michel Korinman (Vallentine Mitchell], London, 2007)
- Russia: A New Cold War? co-edited with Michel Korinman (Vallentine Mitchell, London, 2007)
