= Helsinki Committee for Human Rights in Serbia =

The Helsinki Committee for Human Rights in Serbia (Serbian: Хелсиншки одбор за људска права у Србији, Helsinški odbor za ljudska prava u Srbiji) is a volunteer, non-profit organization concerned with human rights issues in Serbia. It was formed in September 1994 as one of many national Helsinki Committees for Human Rights formerly organized into the now-defunct International Helsinki Federation for Human Rights. The Committee has its main office in Belgrade, Serbia.

In its mission statement, the Committee describes its approach as "different from those of other human rights organizations" in that it "examines the situation of human rights in Serbia against country's overall socioeconomic and political context" and "also provides relevant recommendations" for policies. The organization has spoken out against neo-fascism in Serbia. The Committee's work has been described as fundamental to the process of dealing ongoing European Union integration.

== Areas of activity ==
The organization has six strategic areas of activity:

=== Documentation/Research ===
The Committee has an extensive collection of reports, press clippings and other relevant publications, serving as a resource center for its own staff, national and international scholars and other researchers

=== Transitional justice - "Facing the past/truth" ===
The organization's most important program. The Committee works to achieve the normalization of Serbian society (the "moral minimum") and supports the efforts of Serbian civil society to overcome the legacy of the period that ended in the Bulldozer Revolution in 2000. It seeks to raise awareness of the causes and consequences of the disintegration of the former Yugoslavia and advocates accountability for war crimes committed in Bosnia and Herzegovina, Croatia, Kosovo and Serbia, including official accountability. It contributes to the work of the International Criminal Tribunal for the former Yugoslavia. It also publishes the Helsinki Charter magazine and other publications and promotes and contributes to public debate.

=== Serbia's European Union path ===
The Committee is an advocate for the adoption of standards of accountability in public life, particularly parliamentary activity. It works to promote parliamentary transparency and accountability through public debate and work with individual parliamentarians, particularly women and representatives of multi-ethnic communities (such as Vojvodina) and minority communities (such as Sandžak and Southern Serbia). It also works to reinforce the transparency and accountability of public institutions, elected officials and public servants and the legal system.

=== Educational outreach ===
The Committee works with young people from across Serbia to challenge the influence of propaganda, distorted public values and a politicised educational system, seeking to encourage teenagers, young adults and young professionals to think critically about Serbia's past and present, with a view to encouraging their emergence as community leaders and policymakers.

=== Culture of human rights ===
The "Human rights culture" program is focused on the implementation of major international and European conventions and instruments for the protection of fundamental human rights, in particular the rights of persons deprived of their liberty (prisoners, institutionalized psychiatric patients, etc.) and members of socially marginalized/vulnerable groups, and on safeguarding the position of ethnic minorities and defending the multi-ethnic and multicultural fabric of society.

=== Crisis resolution/conflict prevention ===
The Committee works to resolve inter-communal tensions between Serbs and other ethnic groups, including the anxieties of the isolated Kosovo Serbs and in Serbia's multi-ethnic regions such as Sandžak and South Serbia that suffered by a period of human rights violations, and prone to political manipulation. It brings together people from antagonistic ethnic communities to examine prospects for coexistence and supports efforts at integration with the wider community.
