= Greek Helsinki Monitor =

Human rights organization in Greece

Greek Helsinki Monitor is a human rights organization in Greece, founded as part of the International Helsinki Federation for Human Rights. In 2021, GHM was one of a group of organizations that sued Frontex at the European Court of Justice over its alleged involvement in pushbacks in Greece.

In December 2022, the Public Prosecutor's Office of Kos, using information given to them by the Greek Coast Guard, pressed felony charges against Panagiotis Dimitras, director of the Greek Helsinki Monitor for "setting up a criminal organization in order to receive data of third-country citizens, who attempt to enter Greece illegally, in order to facilitate their illegal entry and stay, by sending to the authorities their full details and their exact location in the country, in order to subject them to asylum procedures". This criminalisation was widely condemned, inter alia in December 2022 by the UN Special Rapporteur on Human Rights Defenders and the UN Special Rapporteur on the Human Rights of Migrants, in January 2023 by the Council of Europe's Commissioner for Human Rights, and in February 2024 by the European Parliament.
