= Mosko =

Mosko Моско
- Village
- Location within Bosnia and Herzegovina
- Coordinates: 42°46′N 18°24′E
- Country: Bosnia and Herzegovina
- Time zone: UTC+1 (CET)
  - Summer (DST): UTC+2 (CEST)

Mosko (Serbian Cyrillic: Моско) is a village in Trebinje, Bosnia and Herzegovina. It is located along the main road between the towns of Trebinje and Bileća.

== History ==
In September 1666, Bajo Pivljanin and Mato Njegošević attacked an Ottoman caravan in Mosko and retreated to Banjani.

== Sources ==
- Mihić, Ljubo (1975). Ljubinje sa okolinom. Dragan Srnic.
