= Machnín =

- Village
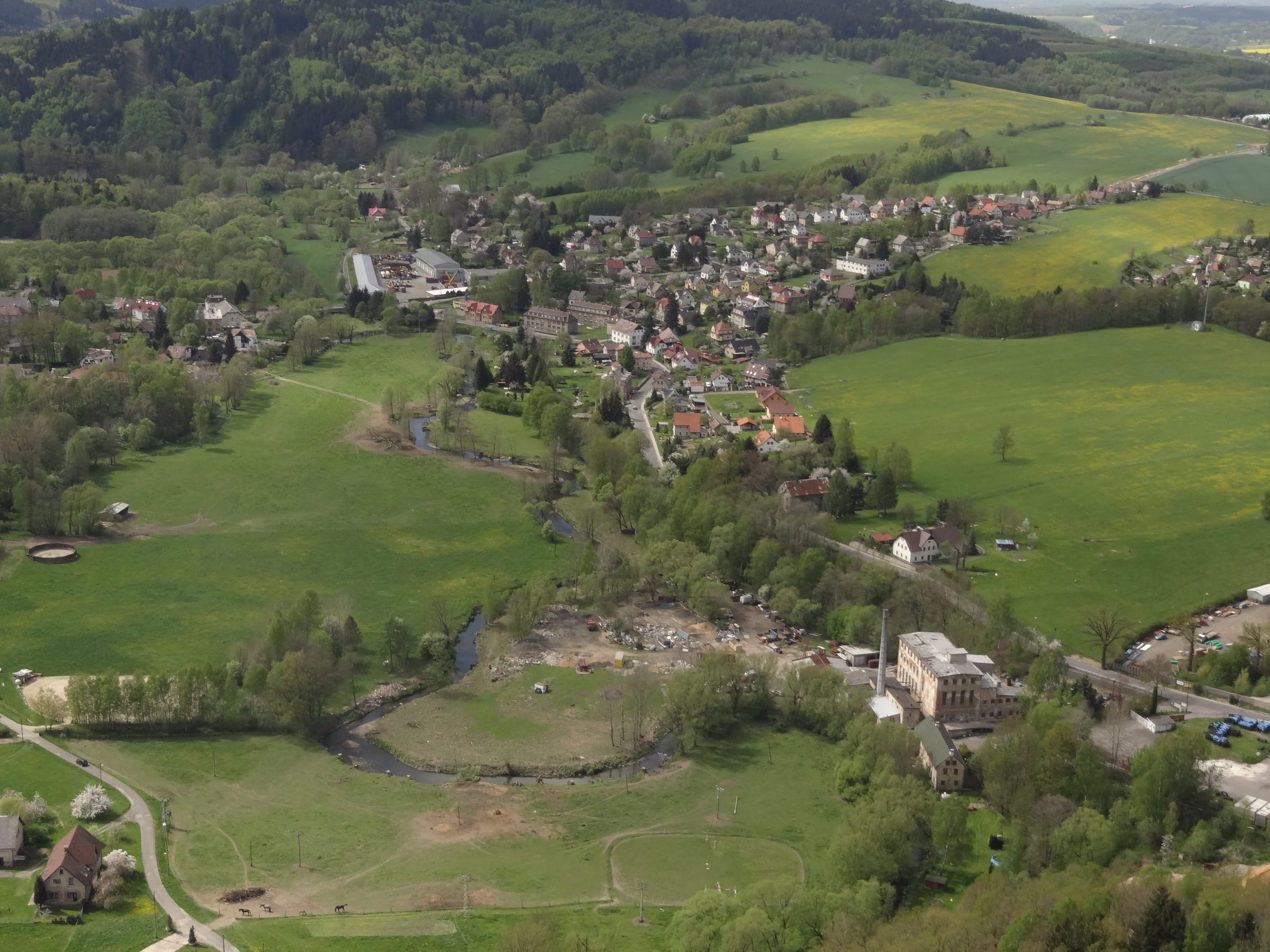
- Aerial view

- Location in the Czech Republic
- Coordinates: 50°47′27″N 14°59′30″E
- Country: Czech Republic
- Region: Liberec
- District: Liberec
- Municipality: Liberec
- First mentioned: 1428
- Elevation: 350 m (1,150 ft)

Population (2011)
  - Total: 1,080
- Postal code: 460 01

Machnín (German: Machendorf), officially Liberec XXXIII-Machnín, is a village and administrative part of the city of Liberec in the Czech Republic.

== History ==
Formerly a village, Machnín was established somewhere in the 14th century by Donín's family, and was named after Burgrave Vilém of Donín's wife Machna. A former name for Machnín was Machnadorf, and some sources also refer to it as Mochendorf, Machndorf or Mochendorff. The first reference to it is found in records from 1428 which mention a battle between Jan Královec and the Sorbs.

From its beginnings, the history of the village was affected by its position on the boundary between Grabštejn and Frýdlant lordships, and by its proximity to the Hamrštejn Castle.
