= Czech Helsinki Committee =

Czech non-profit organization

The Czech Helsinki Committee (Czech: Český helsinský výbor) is a non-governmental non-profit organization for human rights. It has operated in Czechoslovakia since 1988 and in the Czech Republic since 1993. It was founded as one of the first "Helsinki" organizations outside of the USSR, and is the first formalized human rights NGO in the country.

== History of the Czech Helsinki Committee ==
=== CSCE ===
Henry Kissinger is often credited with having coined the term détente in 1973 during the height of Cold War tensions. It was during the so-called détente phase, on 3 July 1973, that the Conference on Security and Co-operation in Europe (CSCE) was opened in Helsinki, Finland. The CSCE was created as a multilateral forum for dialogue and negotiation motivated by the political will to improve relations between East and West and contribute to peace, security, justice and cooperation in Europe.

The CSCE continued again in Geneva, Switzerland, from 18 September 1973 to 21 July 1975, and concluded in Helsinki on 1 August 1975. The meeting in August set up the Helsinki Final Act that contained key commitments on polito-military, economic, environmental, and human rights issues—later known as the "Helsinki process" or "Helsinki Accords". The Helsinki Accords also established ten principles, the "Decalogue", guiding relations between States and governing the relationship between States and their citizens.) Although the CSCE continued primarily as a series of meetings and conferences, the Paris Summit in November 1990—after the end of the Cold War—refocused the CSCE on managing the new changes in Europe. The CSCE gained permanent institutions and operational capabilities, and the name was changed to the Organization for Security and Co-operation in Europe (OSCE) as part of a decision by the Budapest Summit of Heads of State or Government in December 1994.

=== The Helsinki Accords ===
The thirty-five participating States of the CSCE signed the Helsinki Final Act, which at that time, was the only international agreement linking peace and security with an obligation for the respect of human rights. The Decalogue, specifically Principle VII, addressed "[r]espect for human rights and fundamental freedoms, including the freedom of thought, conscience, religion or belief".

On May 12, 1976, at a press conference initiated by physicist and human rights activist Dr. Andrei Sakharov, Dr. Yuri F. Orlov—also a well respected physicist and member of the Armenian SSR Academy of Science—announced the formation of the Moscow Group for Assistance in Implementation of Helsinki Agreements, later known as the Moscow Helsinki Group. The watchdog organization based on Principle VII of the Decalogue, began documenting cases of humanitarian violations against USSR citizens and distributing the documents to the Supreme Soviet Presidium of the USSR, and the governments and media of the thirty-five signatories of the Helsinki Accords. Similar, Helsinki groups were established in Ukraine, Lithuania, Georgia, and Armenia respectively.

=== The International Helsinki Federation ===
As the Helsinki groups were forming inside the USSR, the Worker's Defense Committee was founded in Poland in September 1976. Quickly following, on 1 January 1977, Charter 77 was established in Czechoslovakia. Although not labeled "Helsinki", these groups focused on human rights issues and the accountability of their respective State constitutions and signatures on the Helsinki Accords. In September 1979 the Helsinki Watch Group was formed, and other Helsinki-labeled watchdog organizations were created throughout the thirty-five signatory States of the Helsinki Accords.

In 1982, after an appeal by Dr. Andrei Sakharov, in his 1978 book Alarm and Hope, for "a unified international committee to defend all Helsinki Watch Group members", a number of Helsinki committees held an International Citizens Helsinki Watch Conference in Lake Como, Italy. Ironically, as these groups were meeting and creating a new organization, the Moscow Helsinki Group was forced to disband and almost all its members were arrested. The year before the conference, the U.S. Helsinki Watch Committee—later Human Rights Watch—traveled throughout Eastern and Western Europe seeking out groups and individuals interested in forming an International Helsinki Federation.

On 9 November 1982, member groups from Austria, Belgium, Canada, France, the Netherlands, Norway, Sweden, and the United States formed the International Helsinki Federation. A main goal was to create Helsinki Committees in all thirty-five Helsinki Accords signatory States. The establishment of the Czechoslovak Helsinki Committee was announced on 11 November 1988, and predominantly organized by the founding members of Charter 77.

=== The Czech Helsinki Committee ===
Organizing the Czechoslovak Helsinki Committee along with Charter 77 was, the Jazz Section, the Association for Friendship between the ČSSR and the US, the Independent Peace Association and the Democratic Initiative. The history of the Czech Helsinki Committee is undeniably intertwined with the legacy of other distinguished human rights organizations such as the OSCE, Charter 77, and Human Rights Watch. In fact, the first chairperson of the Czechoslovak Helsinki Committee was Jiří Hájek, a former Minister of Foreign Affairs, and one of the co-founders of Charter 77.

After the Velvet Revolution of November 1989 and the split of Czechoslovakia, the Czech Helsinki and Slovak Helsinki Committee were reformed as separate groups. The Czech Helsinki Committee continued working closely with other Helsinki committees and consulting with the Council of Europe. From monitoring and educating on Human Rights, to counseling centers and legal services the Czech Helsinki Committee continued to grow, and even spawned a separate Refugee Counseling Center and Citizenship Counseling Center. The mission today is similar and branching out to encompass areas such as prisoner's rights, women and children's rights, and asylum seekers.
