= Natalya Narochnitskaya =

Russian historian, politician and diplomat

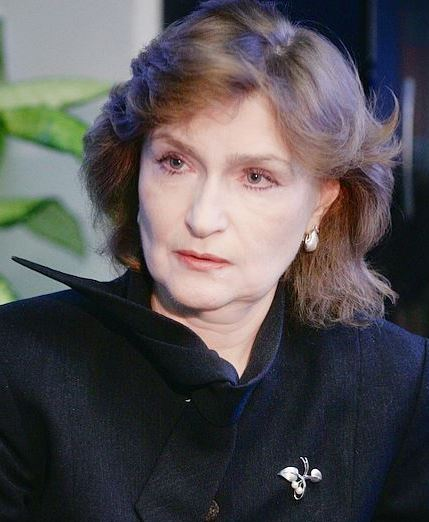
Natalya Narochnitskaya, 2018

Nataliya Alekseevna Narotchnitskaya (Russian: Наталия Алексеевна Нарочницкая) (born 23 December 1948) is a Russian politician, historian and political commentator.

Between 1982 and 1989 Narochnitskaya worked at the Secretariat-General of the United Nations in New York.

In the 1990s Narochnitskaya was a member of several minor political parties in Russia, including Constitutional Democratic Party and Derzhava. She gained some publicity as an advocate of the greater political role of the Russian Orthodox Church and her support of the Russian military actions in Chechnya in 1994-1996. Narochnitskaya was also an outspoken opponent of NATO intervention in former Yugoslavia and of NATO expansion, having called recognition of state continuity for the Baltics a ploy "to dilute the obstacles to the entry of parts of historic Russia into NATO."

Narochnitskaya was elected to parliament as a representative (but not member) of the Rodina block in 2003 and served as vice chairman of the international affairs committee in the State Duma. She was not reelected in 2007.

Narochnitskaya was a protege of the spymaster Yevgeny Primakov at the institute for World Economy in Moscow during the time of the perestroika reforms. (p. 433. Putins People, Catherine Bolton)

Narochnitskaya advocates that an indispensable condition for the success of Russia's foreign policy in the modern world is the renewal and detailed study of traditional pre-Soviet foundations of Russian diplomacy. Considered to be a conservative, Narochinitskaya has argued for "full legal continuity" with pre-Soviet Russia and views post-World War I Bolshevik treaties, which reduced the sovereign Russian territory, as illegitimate.

In January 2008, Narochnitskaya was appointed director of the Paris-based Institute of Democracy and Cooperation, a Russia-funded NGO.

She is an author of several works dedicated to Russian history; antiglobalism; and international, political and spiritual affairs.

Narochinitskaya is often criticized for failing to adhere to the stated purpose of IDC to create “a bridge of solid friendship between two great European nations”. In her numerous interviews she has put forward very hostile views, claiming that the West wants to subjugate Russia, impose its rules on it, even “dismember” it. She is often seen on state TV channels corroborating Putin's claims that the opposition movement in Russia is funded and coordinated by the NATO nations.

She was influenced by Vadim Kozhinov.

== Books ==
- Русский мир [Russian World] (in Russian). Aleteiia. 2008.

== Literature ==
- Horvath, Robert (May 2016). "The Reinvention of 'Traditional Values': Nataliya Narochnitskaya and Russia's Assault on Universal Human Rights". doi:10.1080/09668136.2016.1184230.
