= UNITED for Intercultural Action =

European network against nationalism

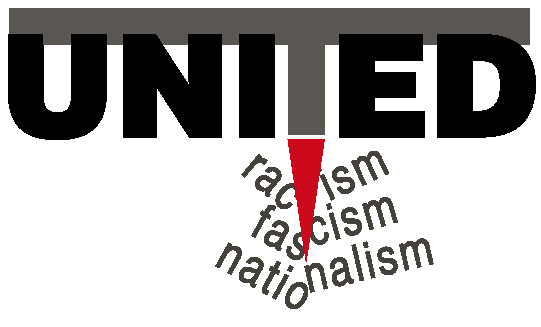
- Formation: 1992; officially registered 1993
- Type: Non-governmental organization; European-wide network of NGOs; non-profit
- Purpose: Anti-nationalism; anti-racism; anti-fascism; support of migrants and refugees
- Headquarters: Amsterdam (secretariat)
- Region served: All 47 member states of the Council of Europe + Belarus, Kazakhstan, Kyrgyzstan and Uzbekistan
- Director: Geert Ates
- Spokesperson: Ralph du Long
- Website: unitedagainstracism.org

UNITED for Intercultural Action is a European network against nationalism, racism, fascism and in support of migrants and refugees, in which over 560 organisations from 48 European countries cooperate. UNITED was founded in 1992 (officially registered as charitable organisation under Dutch law in 1993) and provides a forum for active solidarity and cooperation between a wide variety of organisations in Europe and their activists across European borders.

UNITED defines itself as pan-European tool to strengthen and cross-link grassroots organisations and their actions to improve their socio-political impact. The idea of the UNITED network was born by participants of two anti-racist European youth seminars in Strasbourg in 1992. At these occasions, the need for a European-wide info- and networking system was expressed against the background of the most violent and massive xenophobic riots that took place in Germany after the Second World War: the riot of Rostock-Lichtenhagen August 22–24, 1992.

The work of UNITED mainly focuses on the coordination of European-wide awareness-raising campaigns, organisation of international conferences and the maintenance of an info-system and network structure. UNITED coordinates following annual campaigns:

- European Action Week Against Racism
- International Refugee Day
- International Day Against Fascism and Antisemitism

UNITED has participatory status at the Council of Europe, is often an elected member of the Advisory Council on Youth of the Council of Europe and has since 1997 special consultative status with the Economic and Social Council (ECOSOC) of the United Nations.

== Campaigns ==
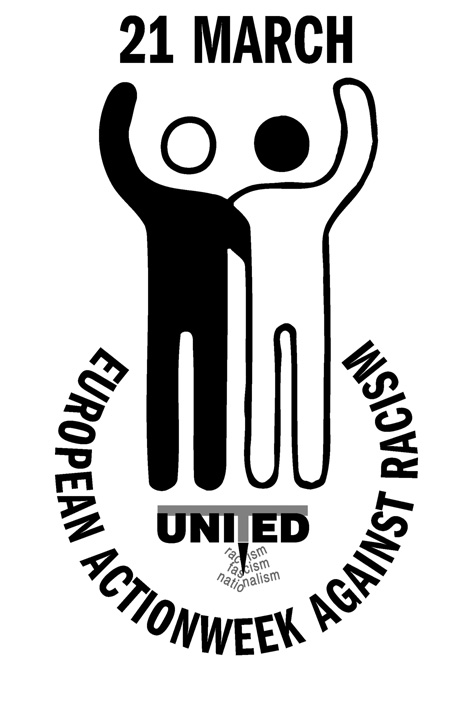
Campaign logo of the "Action Week Against Racism

=== European Action Week Against Racism – 21 March ===
In 1966, the General Assembly of the United Nations declared March 21 the International Day for the Elimination of All Forms of Racial Discrimination as a reaction to the murder of 69 anti-apartheid demonstrators in Sharpeville, South Africa, in 1960.

The first European-wide Action Week Against Racism on occasion of 21 March was organised by UNITED in 1993. Since then, UNITED coordinates the European-wide Action Week Against Racism on an annual basis with the aim to create public attention by stimulating and integrating different activities under the umbrella of a common campaign. UNITED doesn't organise campaign activities, but produces and freely provides so-called “campaign tools” and documents the campaign activities. The campaign activities are organised by independent organisations and groups all over Europe. UNITED collect these activities in an online map available at www.weekagainstracism.eu.

In several countries, the idea of the annual Action Week Against Racism successfully developed into self-reinforcing tendencies, whereby local NGOs started to stimulate national action weeks. Since 2001, annual International Weeks Against Racism (German: Internationale Wochen gegen Rassismus) developed in Germany – the main organisers of this campaign are the German NGOs Interkultureller Rat in Deutschland and Gesicht Zeigen. Semaine d'Actions Contre le Racisme, a Montreal-based NGO, organises a Canada-wide action week against racism since 2000. Other major groups that followed the idea and promoted the action week against racism around 21 March are the European Network Against Racism (ENAR) or Football Against Racism in Europe (FARE). Despite the fact that different national action weeks developed throughout time, all focus around 21 March and are related in their message.

=== International Refugee Day – 20 June ===
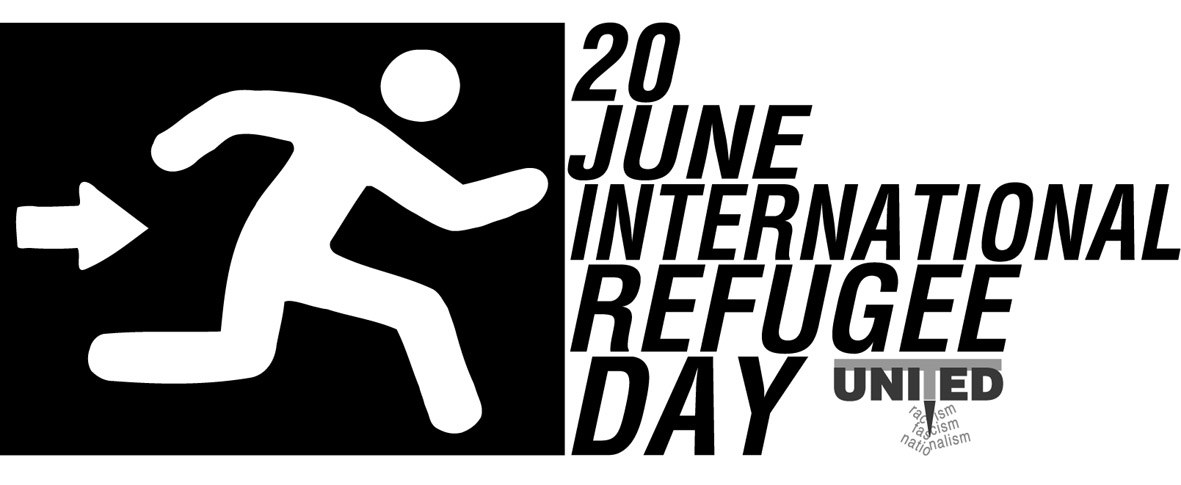
Campaign logo of the "International Refugee Day"

In 2001, a special UN General Assembly Resolution was adopted to declare the former African Refugee Day as the International Refugee Day as an expression of solidarity with Africa, which hosts the most refugees. The General Assembly noted that 2001 marked the fiftieth anniversary of the 1951 Convention relating to the Status of Refugees, and that the Organization of African Unity (OAU) had agreed to have the International Refugee Day coincide with African Refugee Day on 20 June.

UNITED coordinates an annual campaign around this date. This campaign aims to highlight the issues of refugees from a non-governmental perspective. The message of the campaign is carried by the monitoring results of the ongoing monitoring project Fatal Realities of Fortress Europe.

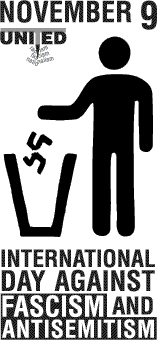
Campaign logo of the "International Day Against Fascism and Antisemitism

=== International Day against Fascism and Antisemitism – 9 November ===
On 9 November 1938, Nazi Germany started a pogrom against Jewish people. Jewish homes were ransacked, as were shops, towns and villages, as SA stormtroopers and civilians destroyed buildings with sledgehammers, leaving the streets covered in pieces of smashed windows—the origin of the name "Kristallnacht", which freely translated means the Night of Broken Glass. 91 Jews were killed, and 30,000 Jewish men – a quarter of all Jewish men in Germany – were taken to concentration camps, where they were tortured for months, with over 1,000 of them dying. Around 1,668 synagogues were ransacked, and 267 set on fire. In Vienna alone 95 synagogues or houses of prayer were destroyed.

The "Kristallnacht" pogrom is seen as the symbolic beginning of the systematic eradication of Jewish people which had started with the discrimination and exclusion of the German Jews since 1933 and which eventually led to the murder of millions Jewish people and so-called "enemies of the German state": homosexuals, criminals and "asocial" people, members of diverse religious communities, people with mental disabilities, political ‘offenders’ such as communists and socialists, Spanish republican refugees, and minorities like Roma and Sinti and others.

Since 1995, UNITED coordinates an annual pan-European campaign on occasion of the 9 November, called International Day against Fascism and Antisemitism. Hereby, the approach is two-fold: while one part of the campaign aims to commemorate victims of the "Kristallnacht" pogrom and, more broadly, victims of the Holocaust and of fascism throughout history; another part focuses mostly on contemporary issues of racism, antisemitism, right-wing extremism and neo-fascism. The campaign is joined by many different groups with independent actions which are collected by UNITED in an online map available at www.dayagainstfascism.eu.

== Fatal Realities of Fortress Europe ==
Since 1993 UNITED has been monitoring the deadly results of the building of 'Fortress Europe' by making a list of the refugees and migrants, who have died in their attempt of entering the 'Fortress' or as a result of Europe's immigration policies. UNITED receives this information from newspapers, journalists, organisations working in the field of refugee and migrant issues, private researchers and governmental organisations. The figures given can only be taken as an indication of the true number of deaths. Each case published by UNITED is documented in the UNITED archives and the scientific part of the documentation can be requested by researchers and journalists to use it for their studies.

By 2011, more than 15,181 deaths have been documented. The so-called "List of Deaths" plays an important role in UNITED's annual Refugee Day campaign and is also used as lobby tool. To measure the magnitude of the "war on migrants", OWNI – an online information and news platform – built an interactive map as an electronic memorial for these tragedies. The "List of Deaths" was also used in several art projects.

== Publications ==
The European Address Book Against Racism is an annual publication that holds contact details and working-field information of organisations active within the scope of UNITED. The printed edition 2011 contained addresses of more than 2,480 organisations and magazines and 155 funding institutions. The searchable online version contains over 4,500 entries.

The Calendar of Internationalism is published several times a year and holds information on events and trainings related to UNITED's working filed. There is also a weekly updated online version of the Calendar.

On a regular basis, UNITED publishes Information Leaflets written by experts and activist within the UNITED working field.

== I CARE – Internet Centre Anti Racism Europe ==
I CARE - Internet Centre Anti Racism Europe is a web-portal featuring discussions and live reports on antiracism activities, mainly within Europe. ICARE is an information disseminator for the European NGO-community working in the fields of anti-discrimination, human rights, antisemitism, diversity and immigration, with a focus on anti-racism. ICARE is a NGO community networking system, an environment where large and small organizations can work on local, national, regional and international issues. The purpose of ICARE is the empowerment of democratic, non-violent Human Rights and antiracism work by offering information and reporting on events taking place, by facilitating communication, advocacy, campaigns and actions and by stimulating intersectional and international co-operation of NGOs.

I CARE started on 1 October 1999 as a cooperation project of UNITED for Intercultural Action and the Magenta Foundation. The aim was to create a portal for anti-racism on Internet. Although the Internet opened-up the possibilities for collaboration with organisations worldwide, the decision was to focus on Europe, as both founding organisations basically work within a European context and because specific aspects of racism are still very much related to In "Real Life" culture, policies and practices. In September 2005 ICARE became a Magenta Foundation-only project.

ICARE reported from the 2001 UN World Conference against Racism (WCAR) in Durban, offering critical appraisal of the conference – which included the judgment "that racism was allowed to run rampant" and that "[w]hat happened in Durban [in 2000] should never happen again."; the website continued to track developments regarding the Durban Review Conference 2009.

In 2010, ICARE set out to establish a new service, the ICARE Hate Crime News. This service contains articles (English only) about hate-motivated incidents and crimes in the 56 Organization for Security and Co-operation in Europe (OSCE) participating States and is updated almost every day with items from 'regular' news sources. Next to individual research, ICARE Hate Crime News makes use of crowdsourcing to collect incident reports. I CARE's secretariat states to monitor all contributions in order to be in line with universally recognised human rights standards. Incident reports need to be written in English language and include source and, if available, web location. For the definition of "hate crime", ICARE points to the working definition that was developed by the OSCE – Office for Democratic Institutions and Human Rights (ODIHR). ICARE Hate Crime News contains articles from 1 January 2010.

== UNITED Archives at IISH ==
UNITED cooperates with the International Institute of Social History (IISH), which is a research institute located in Amsterdam. The UNITED secretariat, also located in Amsterdam, has collectssince 1992 documentation of a wide range of European anti-racist and anti-fascist groups and of organisations in support of migrants and refugees since 1992. The archive was transferred to the IISH in 1998. It consists of correspondence with the connected organizations; questionnaires concerning the start of the network and documents concerning campaigns; documentation on ca. 300 anti-racist and anti-fascist groups and organizations; and documents relating to conferences organised by UNITED, with correspondence, documents concerning preparation, subventions, participants and accommodation.

== See also ==
- No Border Network
- Football Against Racism in Europe (FARE)
- No one is illegal
- Antifaschistische Aktion
- European Network Against Racism (ENAR)
- Anti-racism
- Anti-fascism
- Refugee
- Right of asylum
- Schengen Area
