= Institute of Democracy and Cooperation =

Think tank based in Paris

- Abbreviation: IDC
- Formation: 2008
- Type: Think tank
- Headquarters: Rue de Varenne 63 bis
- Location: Paris
- Director: Natalia Narochnitskaya
- Website: Official website

The Institute of Democracy and Cooperation is a think tank in Paris. It is a separate organisation from the similarly named think-tank in New York. Both were founded in 2008 by a Russian lawyer, Anatoly Kucherena and a group of Russian NGOs, but they were operationally and structurally independent of one another. The main purpose of the organisations was to provide a symmetrical response to the allegations of Freedom House about the human rights violations in Russia. The New York IDC gets defunct in 2015. The Paris site is headed by historian and former Russian State Duma deputy Natalia Narochnitskaya. The British philosopher and historian John Laughland is Director of Studies.

The institute is connected to Russian funds and visions in media and by researchers, and is said to be created following an initiative by Putin and Surkov. When asked about sources of financing, the former IDC director John Laughland stated that the funds are provided by the Foundation for Historical Outlook in Moscow, which in turn is financed by Russian Presidential grants.

== Focus ==
The Institute describes its aims as being

part of the debate about the relationship between state sovereignty and human rights; about East-West relations and the place of Russia in Europe; about the role of non-governmental organisations in political life; about the interpretation of human rights and the way they are applied in different countries; and about the way in which historical memory is used in contemporary politics.

It describes its outlook on human rights and international relations as "broadly conservative", referring to its emphasis on the nation-state as the best framework for the realisation of human rights and a belief that "humanitarian intervention" is often counter-productive.

The institute is active all over Europe, with partners in Rome, Berlin and Prague, and it has organised several Side Events at the UN in Geneva (it is accredited to the UN with ECOSOC status).
