= Helsinki Commission =

Helsinki Commission may mean:

- The Baltic Marine Environment Protection Commission (HELCOM)
- Commission on Security and Cooperation in Europe (U.S. Helsinki Commission)

== See also ==
- Helsinki Committee for Human Rights (Helsinki Committee)
