= Helsinki Committee for Human Rights =

Human rights organization

- Helsinki Committee for Human Rights logo
- Predecessor: International Helsinki Federation for Human Rights
- Legal status: Non-governmental organization
- Purpose: Human rights
- Region served: Europe, Central Asia, North America
- Methods: Advocacy

Helsinki Committees for Human Rights exist in many European countries (and in the wider OSCE region) as volunteer, non-profit organizations devoted to the protection of human rights. Presumably named after the Helsinki Accords, they were formerly organized into the International Helsinki Federation for Human Rights (IHF), based in Vienna.

== History ==
The Helsinki Committees began as Helsinki Watch groups. The first such group was founded in Moscow in May of 1976, the second in Kyiv in November of the same year, as well as the third in Lithuania. Then in 1977 others were founded in Czechoslovakia, Georgia and Armenia, the last in 1979 in Poland. In 1982, representatives of several of these committees held an International Citizens Helsinki Watch Conference and founded the IHF.

In 1992, a British Helsinki Human Rights Group was established in the UK, but this group was completely independent of the International Helsinki Federation for Human Rights. The UK's official representative in the IHF is the British Helsinki Subcommittee of the Parliamentary Human Rights Group, established in 1976.

== Country organizations ==
- Albania: Albanian Helsinki Committee
- Armenia: Helsinki Committee of Armenia
- Belarus: Belarus Helsinki Committee
- Bulgaria: Bulgarian Helsinki Committee
- Croatia: Croatian Helsinki Committee
- Czech Republic: Czech Helsinki Committee
- Denmark: Danish Helsinki Committee
- Hungary: Hungarian Helsinki Committee
- Lithuania: Lithuanian Helsinki Group
- Norway: Norwegian Helsinki Committee
- North Macedonia: Macedonian Helsinki Committee
- The Netherlands: Netherlands Helsinki Committee
- Helsinki Foundation for Human Rights (Poland)
- Romania: Romanian Helsinki Committee
- Russia: Moscow Helsinki Group
- Serbia: Helsinki Committee for Human Rights in Serbia
- Slovakia: Helsinki Committee for Human Rights in Slovakia
- Spain: Helsinki España - Human Dimension
- Sweden: Civil Rights Defenders (formerly the Swedish Helsinki Committee)
- Switzerland: Swiss Helsinki Committee for democracy, Rule of law and Human Rights
- Turkey: Helsinki Citizens' Assembly
- Turkmenistan: Turkmen Helsinki Foundation for Human Rights
- Ukraine: Ukrainian Helsinki Group

== See also ==
- Helsinki Citizens' Assembly
- Helsinki Foundation for Human Rights
- Helsinki Watch and its successor, Human Rights Watch
