= Leonid Šejka =

Serbian painter and architect

Leonid Šejka (1932–1970) was a Serbian painter and architect. He was a member and founder of the art group Mediala.

Šejka is now regarded as one of Yugoslavia's most original painters, who tried to achieve a new objectivity - neither modern nor post-modern - by depicting the contingent object world in a magical space bounded by "City", the "Junk Yards" and the "Castle".
