= Belgrade Six =

The Belgrade Six is the name of the group of six Serbian intellectuals arrested in Belgrade, Yugoslavia, in 1984 and charged with counter-revolutionary activity.

== Members of the group ==
The group consisted of:

- Miodrag Milić
- Milan Nikolić
- Dragomir Olujić
- Vladimir Miljanović
- Gordan Jovanović
- Pavluško Imširović

== Trial ==
The trial was held between 5 November 1984 and 4 February 1985. It received significant media coverage. Zoran Stojković, serving as the presiding judge in trial, rendered a verdict of guilty. One of the defence attorneys was Vladimir Šeks.

The cases against Nikolić, Milić and Olujić were separated from the cases of the other members of the group. They were sentenced to between one and two-year prison terms.
