= International Helsinki Federation for Human Rights =

International human rights organization

- Founded: 1982; 44 years ago
- Dissolved: December 2007; 18 years ago
- Type: NGO
- Purpose: Human rights, activism
- Headquarters: Vienna, Austria
- Region served: Worldwide

The International Helsinki Federation for Human Rights (IHF) was a self-governing group of non-governmental organisations that acted to protect human rights throughout Europe, North America and Central Asia. The federation supported local Helsinki Committees with monitoring their nation's compliance with the human rights provisions of the Helsinki Final Act and its follow-up documents. The organisation was dissolved in late 2007 after an embezzlement scandal caused bankruptcy.

== History ==
The IHF was founded in 1982, inspired in part by Dr Andrei Sakharov's 1978 for the creation of a "unified international committee to defend all Helsinki Watch Group members" after the political persecution and arrest of several activists in the Moscow Helsinki Group. At the founding meeting in Triangolo lariano, members from 18 countries formed the organisation which the various independent Helsinki committees could use to support each other, as well as provide an international body to strengthen their work.

The original members were the independent Helsinki committees of Austria, Belgium, Canada, France, Netherlands, Norway, Sweden and the United States; an international secretariat was established in Vienna. The secretariat supported and provided liaison member Helsinki committees and associated human rights groups, and represented them at the international political level. At the time IHF was dissolved, it had forty-six member committees.

The IHF also had direct links with individuals and groups supporting human rights in countries where no Helsinki committees exist. In addition to gathering and analysing information on human rights conditions in OSCE countries, the IHF acted as a clearing house for this information, disseminating it to governments, inter-governmental organisations, the press and the public at large.

Karl zu Schwarzenberg served as chairman of the federation from 1984 to 1991. The International Helsinki Federation for Human Rights was awarded the European Human Rights Prize in 1989, jointly with Lech Wałęsa.

After the end of the Cold War, the IHF's focus remained on Eastern Europe and Central Asia, issuing warnings about backsliding on human rights in Russia and post-Soviet republics, and the conflict in Chechnya.

== Demise ==
In January 2008, an Austrian court convicted the IHF's former financial manager, the Austrian Rainer Tannenberger, of the embezzlement of €1.2 million. Tannenberger was sentenced to three years in prison, with two of them suspended. The IHF's resulting insolvency had driven it to file for bankruptcy in Austria, its country of registration, and to be dissolved on 27 November 2007. An IHR accountant was sentenced to three years for embezzling $1.8 million from the Helsinki Federation for Human Rights to support his mistress. He channelled money from human rights projects to his bank account, and used the organisation’s ATM card for personal purposes which went unnoticed for six years.

After its closure, IHF's complete archives were transferred to the Blinken Open Society Archives which acts as the organisation's official repository.

== See also ==
- Charter 77
- Helsinki Committee for Human Rights
- Helsinki Foundation for Human Rights
- Hungarian Helsinki Committee
- Bulgarian Helsinki Committee
- Greek Helsinki Monitor
