= Helsinki Watch =

Private American non-governmental organization

- Successor: Human Rights Watch
- Formation: 1978; 48 years ago
- Founded at: Washington, D.C., United States

Helsinki Watch was a private American non-governmental organization established by Robert L. Bernstein in 1978, designed to monitor the former Soviet Union's compliance with the 1975 Helsinki Accords. Expanding in size and scope, Helsinki Watch began using media coverage to document human-rights violations committed by abusive governments. Since its inception, it produced several other watch committees dedicated to monitoring human rights in other parts of the world. In 1988, Helsinki Watch and its companion watch committees combined to form Human Rights Watch.

== History ==
=== Beginnings ===
Following the multinational agreement establishing the Helsinki Accords in 1975, the Helsinki Watch was established to ensure Eastern Bloc countries undergoing severe civil conflict comply with the provisions originally established in the Helsinki Accords. This was the result of an emergence of pressing requests on behalf of organizations located in Moscow, Prague, and Warsaw who were tasked with monitoring the Soviet Union and regions of Eastern Europe to ensure their compliance in facilitating various human rights pledges made throughout the Accords, many of which were arrested by Soviet authorities in early 1977. One of the primary objectives of Helsinki Watch was to serve as an instrument of advocacy for freeing the imprisoned monitors arrested by Soviet officials, but its most noteworthy accomplishments was predicated on promoting civil and political freedoms in the Soviet Union and regions of Eastern Europe. Helsinki Watch developed a means of identifying the corrupt actions of governments by publicly acknowledging unethical behaviour carried out by different governmental bodies through media coverage and directly through policymakers on an international scale.

=== Transition to Human Rights Watch ===
As tensions built between the United States and the Soviet Union, the Americas Watch was created in 1981 in attempt to discredit criticism of double standards and covert geopolitical mission. The Americas Watch set out to observe and acknowledge abuses carried out by governmental bodies situated in Central America, and most notably criticized governments such as the United States for their involvement in providing arms and support to dangerous regimes situated in the Americas. The establishment of other similar organizations rapidly increased through their classification as "The Watch Committees" with the creation of Asia Watch (1985), Africa Watch (1986), and Middle East Watch (1989). In 1988, these committees formally adopted the overarching title of The Human Rights Watch.

=== Funding ===
The establishment of the Helsinki Watch was made possible by a $400,000 grant donated by the Ford Foundation.

=== Timeline ===
- 1978 - Creation of Helsinki Watch
- 1981 - Creation of Americas Watch
- 1985 - Creation of Asia Watch
- 1988 - Creation of Africa Watch
- 1988 - Creation of Human Rights Watch
- 1989 - Creation of Middle East Watch

== Effectiveness ==
Upon its establishment, Helsinki Watch immediately became a major organization with significant leverage internationally. Initially, Helsinki Watch would directly appeal to communist leaders by creating petitions and publicly "naming and shaming" abusive governments. When this method proved to be ineffective, they quickly graduated to using political influence from important Western and European politicians to further their mission of influencing government policy both directly and indirectly. As Helsinki Watch grew, it continued to build its reputation for providing accurate and reliable information on human rights violations in Eastern Europe and the Soviet Union. The Helsinki Watch is said to have played an important role in shaping human rights in the 1980s.

== Criticism ==
Helsinki Watch attracted some allegations of bias during its early days. It was criticized for narrowing its scope to human-rights violations committed by the Soviet bloc while ignoring human-rights violations that were occurring in other parts of the world. Many suggested that its strategy of enlisting the help of Europeans to denounce the Soviet Union reflected this. It was specifically criticized for being lopsided in its mission, as in its early days it neglected to recognize abuses taking place within United States. In response to such criticism, the founders of Helsinki Watch created a new division called Americas Watch. From there the organization expanded rapidly, establishing Watches to cover other parts of the world. In 1988, all of the Helsinki Watch's separate divisions were amalgamated into one unit called the Human Rights Watch.

== Major publications ==
Published in 1991, major publications of Helsinki Watch include:

- Destroying Ethnic Identity: The Persecution of Gypsies in Romania: Helsinki Watch conducted an interview with regard to eleven attacks on the Romanian Romani.
- Glasnost in Jeopardy: Human Rights in the USSR: An overview of the legal, social and governmental institutions and ways they have created difficulties for the development of human rights in the Soviet Union. The book describes the former president of the USSR Mikhail Gorbachev's attempt to reestablish law and order within the Soviet Union.
- Human Rights in Northern Ireland: This book reports the issues surrounding the Troubles within Northern Ireland and helps readers better understand the legal aspects of fighting among parties.
- Since the Revolution: Human Rights in Romania: This publication shows the attempt of new political culture after the revolution in 1989.
