= List of Croatian philosophers =

This is a list of notable philosophers who either spent many productive years of their lives in Croatia or the country's citizens working abroad, in alphabetical order:

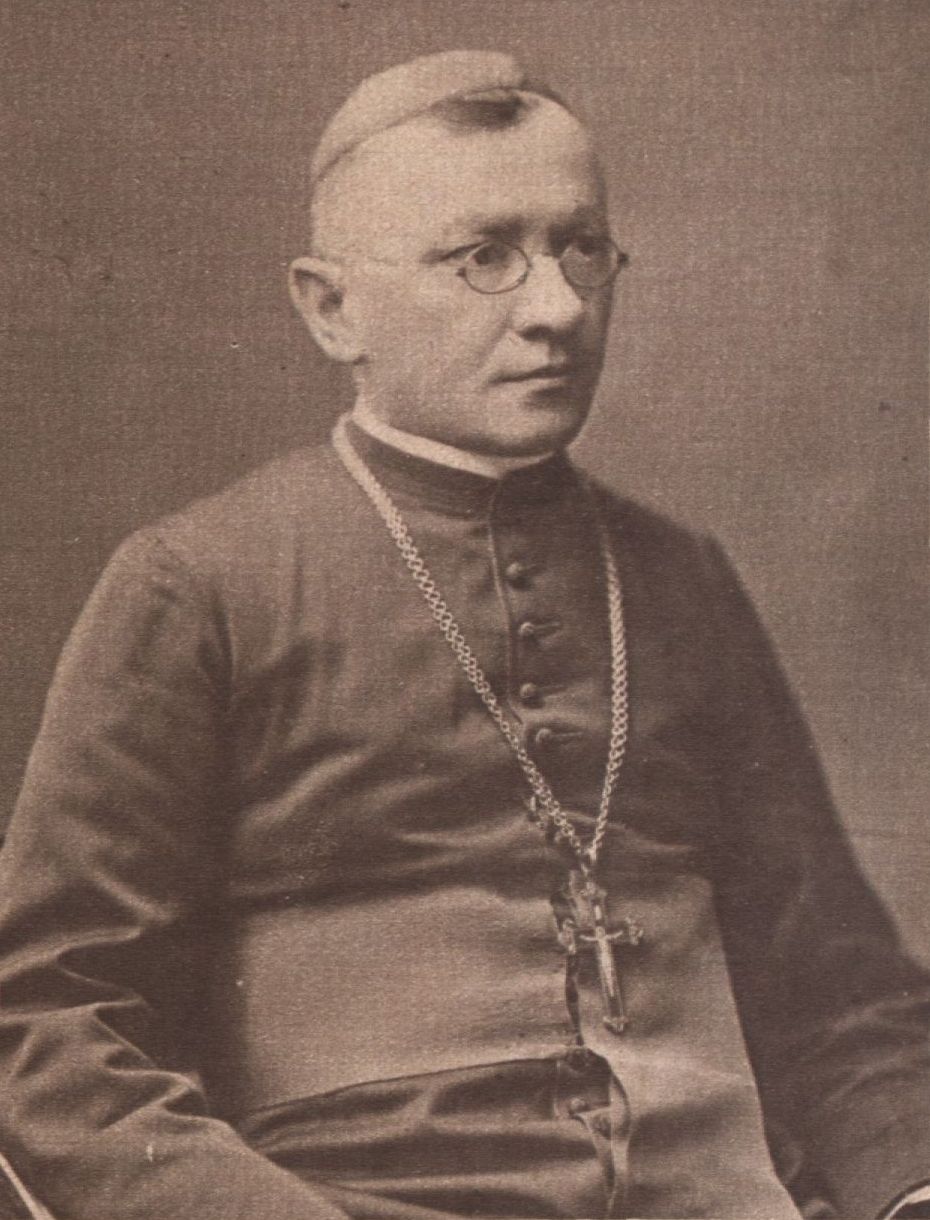
Antun Bauer

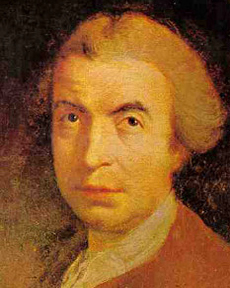
Ruđer Josip Bošković

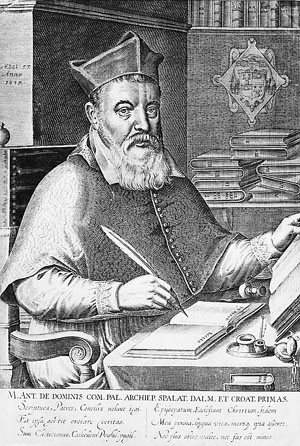
Markantun de Dominis

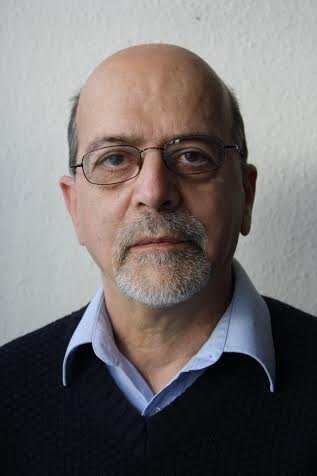
Predrag Finci

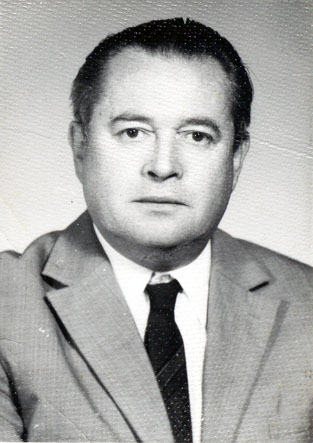
Anđelko Habazin

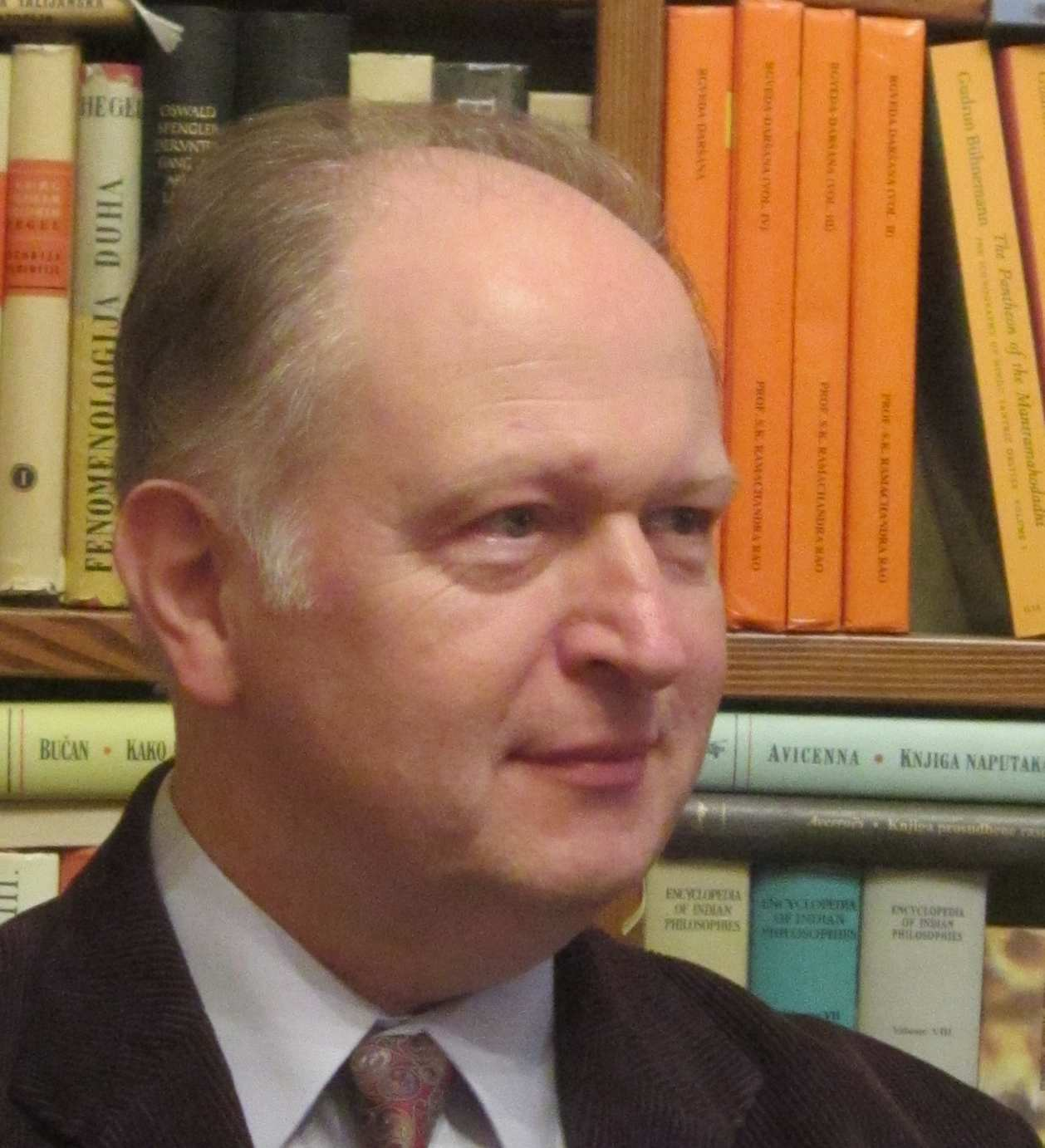
Mislav Ježić

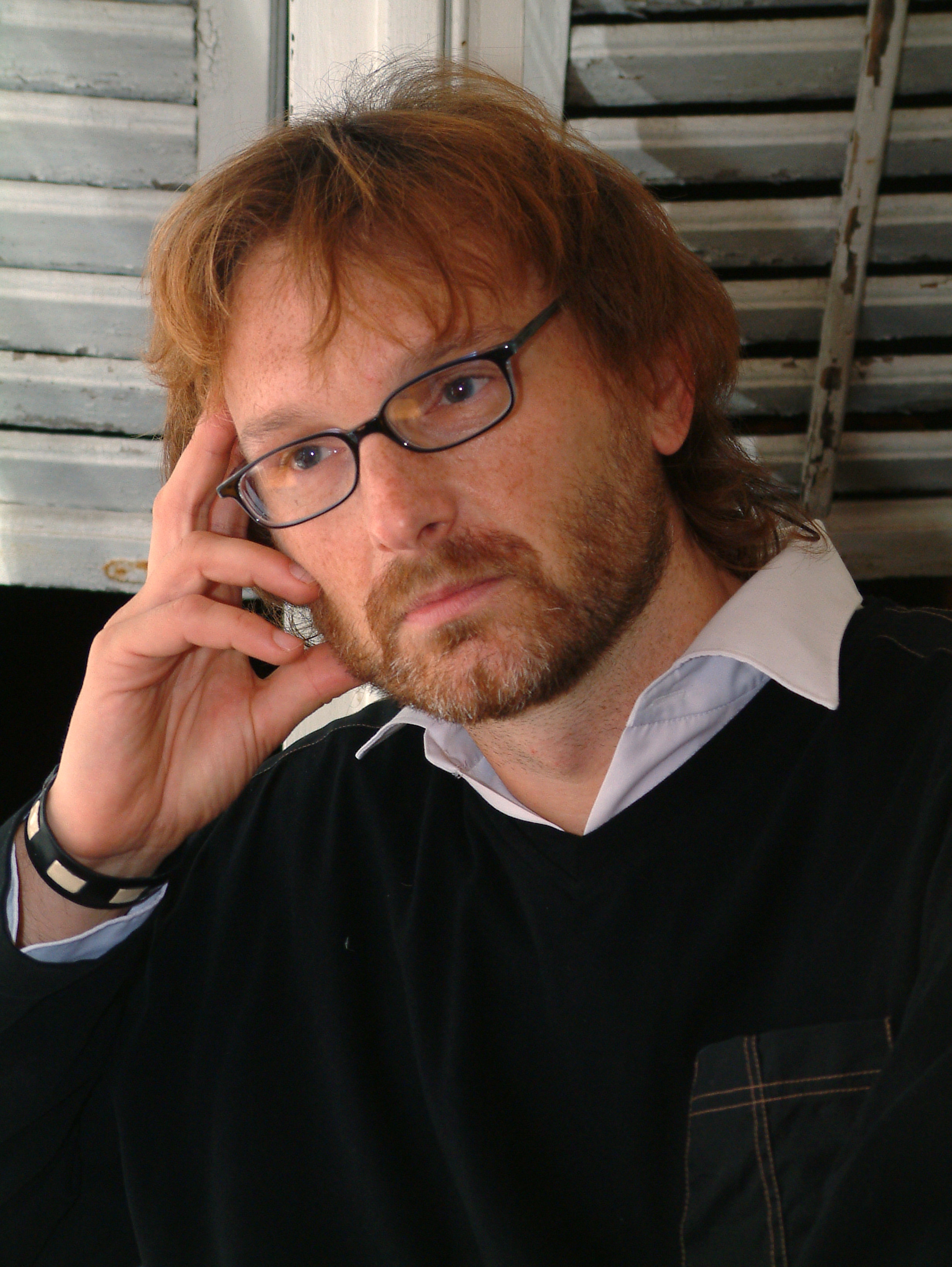
Mario Kopić

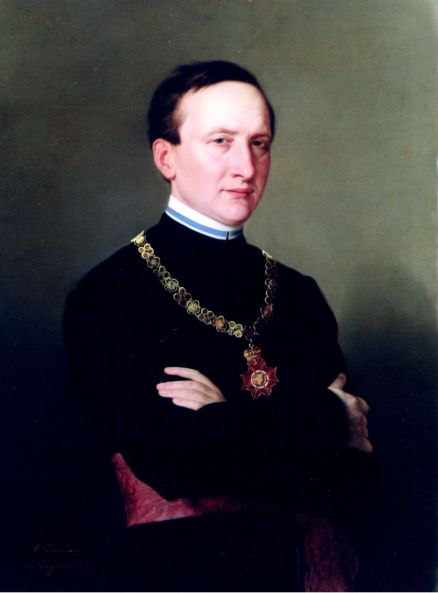
Antun Kržan

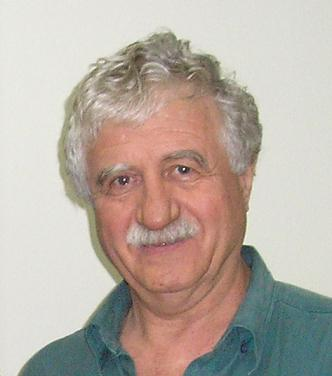
Željko Loparić

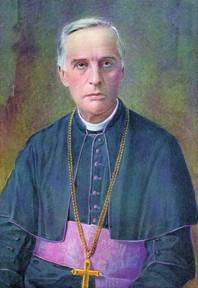
Antun Mahnić

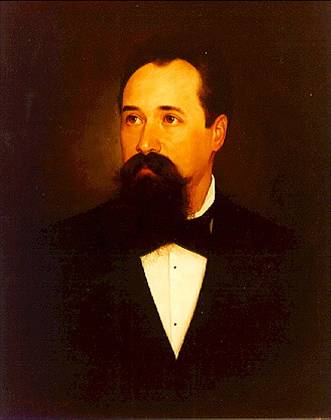
Franjo Marković

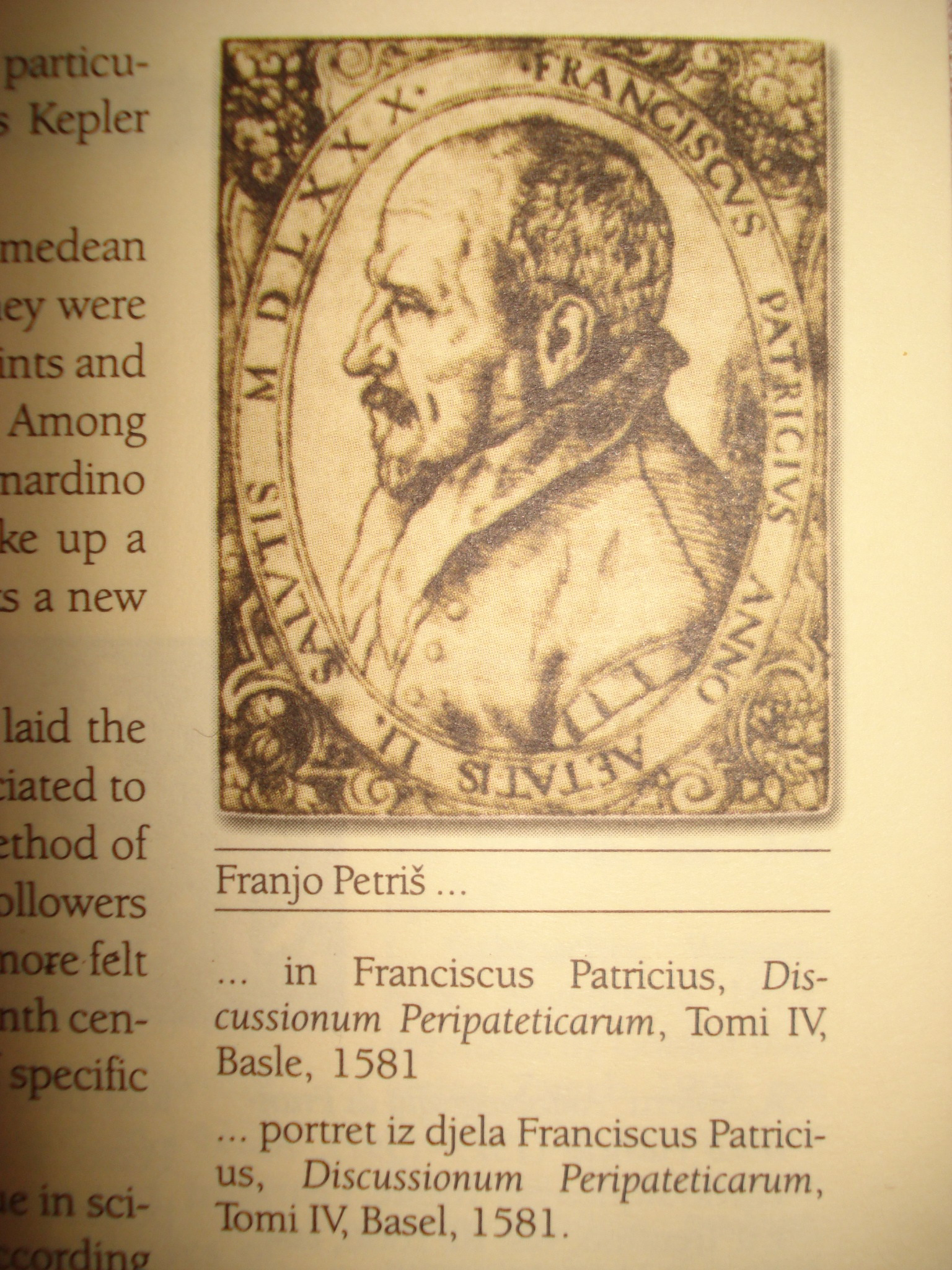
Franjo Petriš

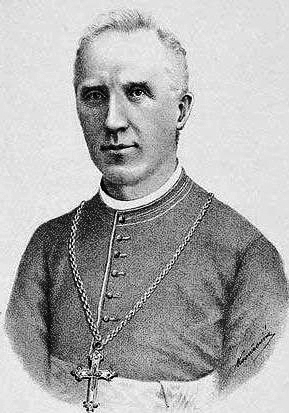
Josip Stadler

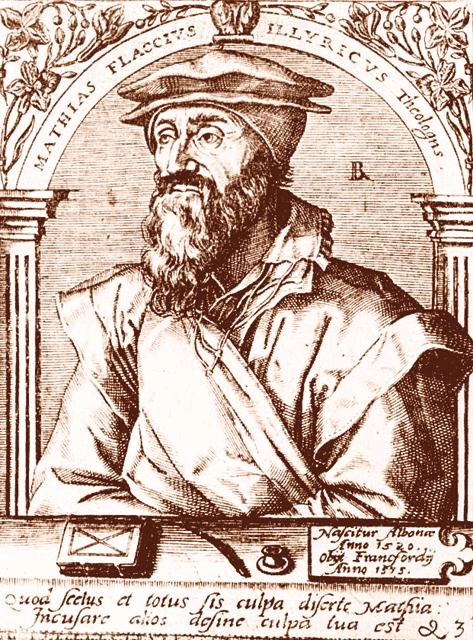
Matija Vlačić – Ilirik

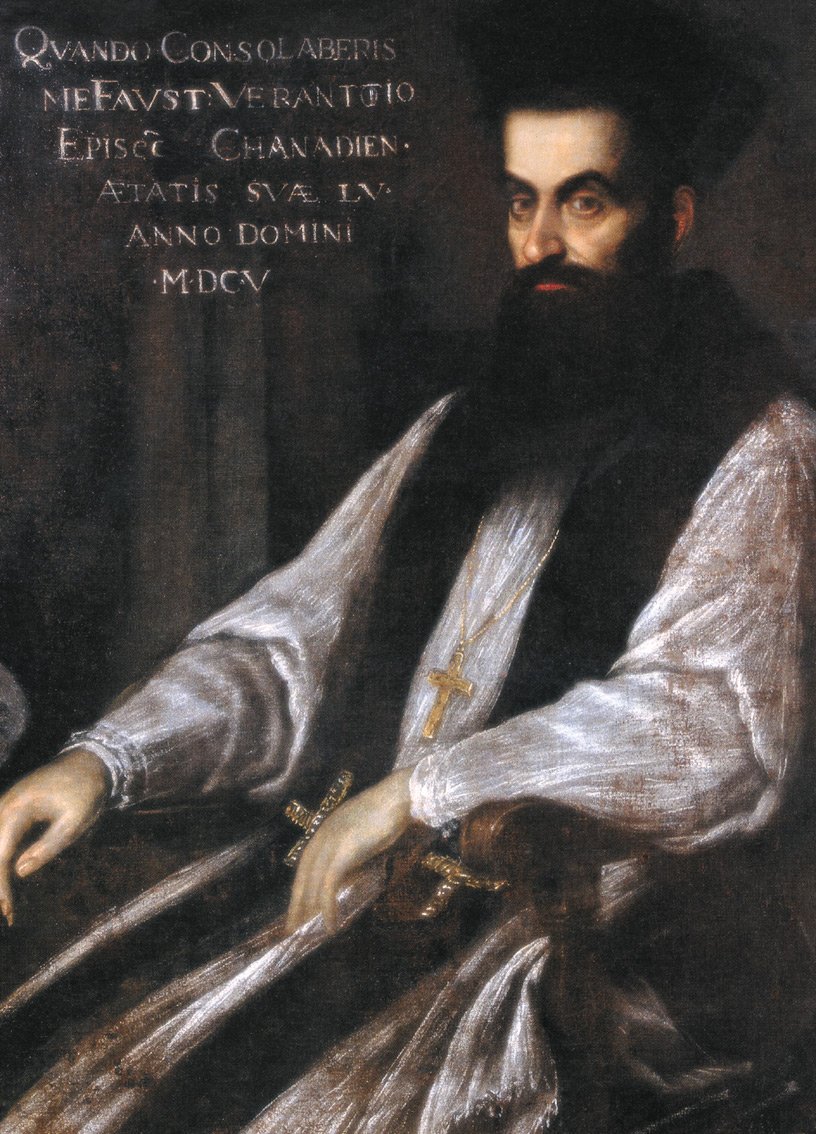
Faust Vrančić

== A ==
- Đuro Arnold (1853–1941), philosopher, writer and pedagogue

== B ==
- Julije Bajamonti (1744–1800), polymath, physician, medical historian, encyclopedist, translator, composer and music theoretician
- Karlo Balić (1899–1977), theologian, writer and philosopher
- Pavo Barišić (born 1959), philosophical historian and bioethicist
- Antun Bauer (1856–1937), theologian, philosopher and writer
- Ruđer Josip Bošković (1711–1787)^{[1]}^{[2]}, polymath, physicist, astronomer, mathematician, theologian, diplomat and poet
- Branko Bošnjak (1923–1996), sociologist, comparatist, philosopher, writer and philosophical historian

== C ==
- Nadežda Čačinovič (born 1947), philosopher, sociologist and comparatist

== D ==
- Blaženka Despot (1930–2001), philosopher and sociologist
- Branko Despot (born 1942), philosopher and philosophical historian
- Markantun de Dominis (1560–1624), polymath, ecclesiastic, physicist, mathematician and philosopher
- Vladimir Dvorniković (1888–1956), philosopher and ethno-psychologist
- Rajmund Džamanjić (1587–1647), theologian, philosopher and linguist

== E ==
- Bruna Esih (born 1975), philosopher, historian and politician

== F ==
- Heda Festini (born 1928), philosopher and philosophical historian
- Ljiljana Filipović (born 1951), philosopher and writer
- Predrag Finci (born 1946), philosopher and essayist
- Ivan Focht (1927–1992), philosopher, mycologist and critic
- Matija Frkić (1583–1669), theologian and philosopher

== G ==
- Vlado Gotovac (1930–2000), essayist, poet, philosopher and politician
- Stjepan Gradić (1613–1683), polymath, astronomer, theologian, translator, poet and diplomat
- Danko Grlić (1923–1984), marxist theorist and humanist
- Nikola Vitov Gučetić (1596–1647), polymath, philosopher, physicist, science writer and politician

== H ==
- Anđelko Habazin (1924–1978), philosopher of science and historian
- Herman Dalmatin (c. 1100 – c. 1160), philosopher, astronomer, astrologer, mathematician and translator
- Srećko Horvat (born 1983), marxist theorist and political philosopher

== I ==
- Rada Iveković (born 1945), philosopher, indologist, feminist and writer

== J ==
- Mislav Ježić (born 1952), philosopher, philologist and indologist

== K ==
- Milan Kangrga (1923–2008), social philosopher and marxist theorist
- Daniel Kolak (born 1955), philosopher of science and religion
- Mario Kopić (born 1965) philosopher, translator and writer
- Antun Kržan (1835–1888), philosopher and theologian
- Rajmund Kupareo (1914–1996), theological writer, philosopher, translator, composer and poet
- Ivan Kuvačić (1923–2014), marxist and sociologist

== L ==
- Željko Loparić (born 1939), philosopher and historian of philosophy

== M ==
- Antun Mahnić (1850–1920), theologian and philosopher
- Julije Makanec (1904–1945), politician, philosopher and writer
- Ljubomir Maraković (1887–1959), literary historian, critic, writer and Catholic philosopher
- Franjo Marković (1845–1914), philosopher and writer
- Ignac Josip Dominik Martinović (1755–1795), theologian, philosopher, physicist and politician

== P ==
- Danilo Pejović (1928–2007), philosopher and editor
- Franjo Petriš (1529–1597), polymath, philosopher, scientist, writer and humanist
- Gajo Petrović (1927–1993), marxist theorist, humanist and editor
- Žarko Puhovski (born 1946), philosopher and political scientist

== R ==
- Bonaventura Radonić (1888–1945), theologian and philosopher
- Nino Raspudić (born 1975), philosopher, writer and political analyst

== S ==
- Neven Sesardić (born 1949), philosopher and geneticist
- Viktor Sonnenfeld (1902–1969), translator and philosopher
- Josip Stadler (1843–1918), theologian, philosopher and writer
- Ivan Supek (1915–2007), physicist, philosopher, writer, playwright, peace activist and humanist
- Vanja Sutlić (1925–1989), philosopher, essayist and philosophical historian
- Goran Švob (1925–1989), logician, philosopher and author

== V ==
- Matija Vlačić – Ilirik (1520–1575), theologian, historian, writer and philosopher
- Faust Vrančić (1551–1617), polymath, inventor, engineer, humanist, linguist and latinist
- Predrag Vranicki (1922–2002), Marxist humanist and philosopher

== See also ==
- List of Croatian inventors
- List of Croatian artists
