= Institute for Philosophy and Social Theory =

Research institute of the University of Belgrade

Institute for Philosophy and Social Theory Институт за филозофију и друштвену теорију
- Established: 1981; 45 years ago
- Focus: philosophy and social theory
- Address: Kraljica Natalija Street 45
- Location: Belgrade, Serbia
- Website: Official website

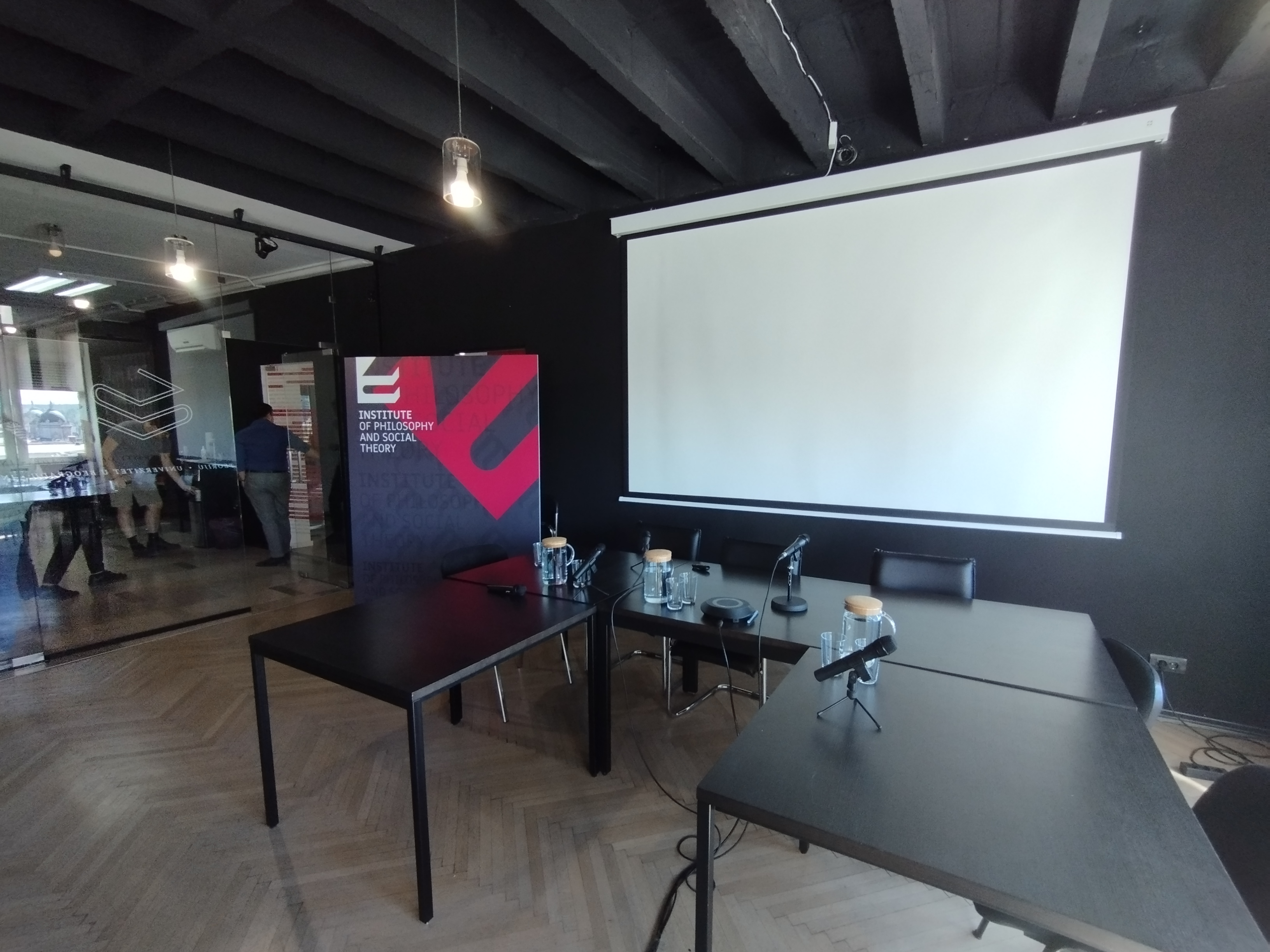
Conference room of the Institute

The Institute for Philosophy and Social Theory (Serbo-Croatian: Институт за филозофију и друштвену теорију, Institut za filozofiju i društvenu teoriju) of the University of Belgrade is a research institute based in Belgrade, Serbia focused at research in the fields of philosophy and social theory. The Institute traces its roots to the establishment and initial activities of the Praxis School group in Belgrade. It was founded in 1981 so that professors who were removed from teaching at the Faculty of Philosophy after the student protests of 1968, including Zagorka Golubović, Mihailo Marković, Ljubomir Tadić, Svetozar Stojanović, Miladin Životić, Dragoljub Mićunović, Nebojša Popov and Trivo Inđić could find employment there. From 1985 until late 1980s the institute worked as the Center for Philosophy and Social Theory. Before officially receiving its current name and research status in project cycles on February 12, 1992, the Institute began its activities informally.

== See also ==
- Institute for Recent History of Serbia
