= Predrag Vranicki =

Yugoslav and Croatian philosopher (1922–2002)

- Born: 21 January 1922; Benkovac, Yugoslavia
- Died: 31 January 2002 (aged 80); Zagreb, Croatia

Education
- Education: University of Zagreb; University of Belgrade

Philosophical work
- School: Marxism; Praxis School
- Notable works: History of Marxism; Philosophy of History

Predrag Vranicki (21 January 1922 – 31 January 2002) was a Yugoslav and Croatian Marxist academic, philosopher, and author. He worked at the Faculty of Philosophy of the University of Zagreb from 1947 until his retirement, serving as its dean from 1964 to 1966, and as the rector of the University of Zagreb from 1972 to 1976. He was affiliated with the Praxis School in the 1960s. Born in Benkovac, Vranicki's education spanned all over Yugoslavia, graduating from the University of Zagreb in 1947 and earning his PhD from the University of Belgrade in 1951. Initially an assistant and docent at the Faculty of Philosophy, he became a professor in 1959. He became a member of the Yugoslav Academy of Sciences and Arts (JAZU), later Croatian Academy of Sciences and Arts, in 1976.

Influenced by Karl Marx, Vranicki's most important works include History of Marxism (1961) and Philosophy of History (1988), with the former being known worldwide and translated in many languages. Vranicki is the most-translated Croatian philosopher and has received praise from philosophers and academics, describing him as an important Croatian Marxist philosopher. Ideologically, Vranicki was a communist and Yugoslavist, while also supporting socialist self-management.

== Early life and education ==
Predrag Vranicki was born on 21 January 1922. His family is of Polish descent, which was relatively unknown to the public. His father, Gustav, was a veterinarian while Antoaneta (née Gotovac) was a history professor. His mother is a descendant of the composer Jakov Gotovac. Vranicki was one of the two children, with his brother being Srđan, a Yugoslav Partisan who died during World War II.

Vranicki was born in Benkovac, but his family moved a lot in his youth, presumably because of his father's profession, so his primary education spanned Vojvodina, Serbia and Bosnia and Herzegovina as he attended primary school in Senta, Zaječar, and Jajce. He started his secondary education at a gymnasium in Visoko, Bosnia and Herzegovina, then moved to Petrinja, Croatia, and finished it in Zagreb. After high school, he enrolled in the Faculty of Medicine of the University of Zagreb in 1939, however, two years later, he moved to the Faculty of Philosophy instead. Vranicki's education was interrupted by World War II and he subsequently joined the Yugoslav Partisans. In 1939, he joined the League of Communist Youth of Yugoslavia (SKOJ). After the war, he resumed his studies at the Faculty of Philosophy and graduated in 1947. In 1951, he earned his PhD at the Faculty of Philosophy of the University of Belgrade, with his dissertation being The Problem of General, Particularm and Individual in Classic Marxism. He habilitated at the Faculty of Philosophy of the University of Zagreb in 1952.

In his youth, Vranicki practised discus throw and shot put, while he was also a mountaineer.

== Career ==
Due to his critical thinking skills, professors of the Faculty of Philosophy endorsed him as an assistant and he was successfully appointed to that position in the autumn of 1947. Two years later, he became a lecturer of historical materialism. In 1953, he became a docent at the Faculty of Philosophy. He was promoted to associate professor in 1959 and regular professor in 1962. Together with Gajo Petrović, Milan Kangrga, Branko Bošnjak, Vanja Sutlić, and Danilo Pejović, he translated various books into Serbo-Croatian language. In 1956, they started the 12-book Filozofska hrestomatija. Vranicki played a critical role in shaping Croatian philosophy.

During his stint in the Faculty of Philosophy, he went on specialisations, first in France in 1957 and later Germany in 1967. In France, he worked on his History of Marxism book, which was supported by the Humboldt Foundation. Vranicki was later the head of the Department of Philosophy of Marxism, Department for Theoretical Philosophy, and Department for Philosophy. He was appointed dean of the Faculty of Philosophy in 1964 and he ended up serving two academic years, until 1966. In 1972, he became the rector of the University of Zagreb and served in that role for two terms until 1976. In the meantime, he co-founded the Yugoslav Institute for Philosophy in 1967 and served as its first director until 1968. He retired as professor in 1976, at the age of 54. He again visited Germany in 1976 and in the late 1980s, when he began working on Philosophy of History.

Besides his academic career, Vranicki was also an editorial staff member of the Kolo and Praxis magazines, the latter being established in 1964. He was also a participant in the Korčula Summer School, but later disassociated himself with the movement. In the 1960s and 1970s, he refused to proclaim himself as a dissident, despite personal attacks from the Soviet Union and Eastern Bloc.

== Retirement ==
During his retirement, he was offered to serve in public offices, but refused to do so. He was a member of the Yugoslav Academy of Sciences and Arts (JAZU) from 1976 and a member of the International Institute of Philosophy in Paris. In 1979, he was promoted to a regular member of the JAZU. As a member of the JAZU, he served as a president of several boards and gave several lectures. He was also a member of the editorial team of the magazine Anali, published by JAZU, and a corresponding member of the Vojvodina Academy. He was opposed to its merging into the Serbian Academy of Sciences and Arts due to their promotion of Greater Serbia policy. Vranicki remained a member of JAZU, transformed in 1990 as Croatian Academy of Sciences and Arts (HAZU), after the dissolution of Yugoslavia.

In the 1980s and 1990s, he refused to align with nationalism. Despite this, he defended the writer Dobrica Ćosić from nationalist accusations, even writing an article about him in the Belgrade-based Književnost magazine. Later in his life, he was associated with the magazine NIN and the newspaper Politika.

== Legacy and reception ==
Vranicki was influenced by Karl Marx. Vranicki was a Marxist and socialist academic, scholar, and philosopher, who dealt with history of philosophy, ontology, and anthropology. He was also interested in economy, sociology, and history in general. In his PhD dissertation, he discussed philosophical problems of Marx, Friedrich Engels, and Vladimir Lenin. His second work, The Development of Karl Marx's Thought, discussed Marx's philosophical thought and his criticism of Georg Wilhelm Friedrich Hegel's philosophy of the state. In his third work, History of Marxism, he discussed Marxism in general, but from a critical perspective. The political scientist Milorad M. Drachkovitch praised the book for its details, Marxist thought, criticism of Stalinism, while criticising it for being Tito-centric, apologistic towards Lenin, and intolerant towards reformists such as Karl Kautsky and Eduard Bernstein. According to the NIN, History of Marxism was known worldwide and was translated in many languages. 10 editions of the book were published. Vranicki also worked on Human and History, a collection of essays, and the Dictionary of Marxism in Split.

The historian Zlatko Čepo reviewed Marxism and Socialism in 1979, praising it for being ambitious and readable, and for its analysis of Stalinism, while criticising it for sometimes not answering key questions, its idealisation of Lenin, as well as justifying too much of Lenin's moves while in power. Čepo went on to review Self-management as a Permanent Revolution in 1985, writing that it well-compensates Marxism and Socialism, while also praising its analysis of self-management movements, such as workers' movements and soviets, writing that its useful for learning workers' democracy. He also wrote that the book criticises state socialism, idealises Lenin, and justifies his centralist tendencies. Besides History of Marxism, Philosophy of History is also a well-known work of Vranicki. The literary critic Tonči Valentić, reviewing the third edition which is focused on post-World War II history, positively received the book's extensiveness, analysis, history of the Praxis school, humanism, and objectivity, while criticising its Marxist bias and illegibility, adding that the book would have weak reception due to being overdemanding.

Vranicki is the most-translated Croatian philosopher. The philosopher Lino Veljak described Vranicki as one of Croatia's most important philosophers of all time. The academics Kristijan Krkač and Ivan David Dogan consider Vranicki as one of the most important Croatian Marxist philosophers. Vranicki's work was also praised by Vladimir Premec, the director of the Centre for Philosophical Research in Sarajevo, while also noting that he was popular with students abroad.

== Personal life ==
Vranicki was married to Milica (née Polić), who was born in Hreljin and was a teacher by profession. She quit her job to focus on her family and ended up accompanying her husband on various trips. She would often make meals for guests at their home. They had two children, Nenad, a professor of history and philosophy, and Senka, a London-based architect. They had two grandchildren, Ivan and Srđan. Vranicki was friends with Džemil Šarac, a Yugoslav People's Army general, Vojmir Vinja, a linguist, Jürgen Habermas, and Hans-Georg Gadamer, German philosophers, and Predrag Matvejević, a publicist.

He helped others defend from the 1964 Zagreb flood. He was awarded the Matica hrvatska Award (1953), the Božidar Adžija Award (1963), and the Award for Life Accomplishment from the Socialist Republic of Croatia (1987).

Vranicki's main hobby was music. He often listened to it and played a piano. He resided in Zagreb, Croatia, where he died on 31 January 2002. Ivica Račan, the prime minister of Croatia, sent condolences.

He was a communist and Yugoslavist; he also supported socialist self-management.

== Bibliography ==
Vranicki's major works include:

- Contributions to the Problems of the Social Sciences (1951)
- On the Problem of the General, Particular, and Individual in Classical Marxism (1952)
- Thought Development of Karl Marx (1953, 1963)
- Philosophical Studies and Criticism (1957)
- Dialectical and Historical Materialism (1958, 1962, 1978)
- History of Marxism (1961, 1971, 1975, 1978, 1987)
- Man and History (1967)
- Marxist Themes (1973, 1975)
- Marxist System (1973)
- Philosophical Portraits (1974)
- Friedrich Engels – Man and Work (1975)
- On Some Controversies in Marxism (1976)
- Philosophical Discussions (1979)
- Marxism and Socialism (1979)
- The Socialist Alternative (1982)
- Revolution and Criticism (1983)
- Self-management as a Permanent Revolution (1985)
- Philosophy of History: Historical Overview (1988, 1994)
- Demarcations (1988)
- Philosophy of History (2001, 2002, 2003)

== Sources ==
- Čepo, Zlatko (1979). "Predrag Vranicki, Marksizam i socijalizam, Zagreb 1979" [Predrag Vranicki, Marxism and Socialism, Zagreb 1979]. Časopis za suvremenu povijest (in Croatian). 11 (2–3): 147–150.
- Čepo, Zlatko (1985). "Predrag Vranicki, Samoupravljanje kao permanentna revolucija, Zagreb 1985, 195 str" [Predrag Vranicki, Self-management as a Permanent Revolution, Zagreb 1985, 195 pages.]. Časopis za suvremenu povijest (in Croatian). 17 (1): 193–196.
- Strčić, Petar; Polić, Maja; Burger, Hotimir (2013). Despot, Branko (ed.). Predrag Vranicki: 1922. – 2002 [Predrag Vranicki: 1992-2002]. Spomenica preminulim akademicima (in Croatian). Vol. 186. Croatian Academy of Sciences and Arts. ISBN 978-953-154-229-6. ISSN 1330-0865.
- Drachkovitch, Milorad M. (March 1964). "Predrag Vranicki, Historija Marksizma. Zagreb: Naprijed, 1961. 633 pp". Slavic Review. 23 (1): 137–138. doi:10.2307/2492383.
- Krkač, Kristijan; Dogan, Ivan David (4 June 2025). "Was Croatian Marxist Philosophy Important? An Outline of an Empirical Approach". Prolegomena. 24 (1): 115–135. doi:10.26362/20250105.
- Valentić, Tonči (2004). "Predrag Vranicki: Filozofija historije III" [Predrag Vranicki: Philosophy of History III]. Filozofska istraživanja (in Croatian). 24 (2): 642–643.
- Veljak, Lino (2014). "Prilog vrednovanju djela Predraga Vranickog" [Contribution to the evaluation of the work of Predrag Vranicki]. Prilozi za istraživanje hrvatske filozofske baštine (in Croatian). 40 (79): 385–389.
