= Ivan Kostić =

Ivan Kostić may refer to:

- Ivan Kostić (footballer, born 1989), Serbian association football defender
- Ivan Kostić (footballer, born 1995), Serbian association football goalkeeper
- Ivan Kostić (Serbian politician) (born 1975), Dveri politician
- Ivan Ejub Kostić (born 1979), Serbian political scientist and islamologist
