= Habazin =

Habazin is a Croatian surname. The Croatian census of 2011 listed it as one of the most common surnames in Marija Bistrica.

Surname is found in the 1902 Hartmann's general list of apartments in Zagreb.

Notable people with the surname include.

- Ivana Habazin, a Croatian boxer
- Anđelko Habazin, a Croatian philosopher
