= Nythamar de Oliveira =

Nythamar de Oliveira (born 22 October 1960) is a Brazilian philosopher, theologian, and university teacher. Born in Rio de Janeiro, Brazil, he is full professor at the School of Humanities of the Pontifical Catholic University of Rio Grande do Sul, in Porto Alegre.

== Bibliography ==
- Tractatus practico-theoreticus. Porto Alegre, 2016.
- Tractatus politico-theologicus. Porto Alegre, 2016.
- Tractatus ethico-politicus. Porto Alegre, 1999.
- On the Genealogy of Modernity: Foucault’s Social Philosophy. Hauppauge, NY: 2003. Paperback edition: 2012.
- Rawls. Rio de Janeiro, 2003.
- Justice and Recognition: On Axel Honneth and Critical Theory. Co-edited with Marek Hrubec et al. Prague, 2015. Includes contributions by Axel Honneth, Kenneth Baynes, Hans-Georg Flickinger, Frédéric Vandenberghe, Marek Hrubec, Alessandro Pinzani et al.
- Global Justice and Democracy. Co-edited with D.G. Souza. Porto Alegre, 2009. Includes contributions by Ernst Tugendhat, André Berten, Georg Lohmann, François Marty, Jean-Christoph Merle, Wolfgang Kersting, Alessandro Pinzani et al.
- Bioethics, Biotechnology, Biopolitics. Co-edited with R.T. Souza. Porto Alegre, 2008. Includes contributions by Bernhard Waldenfels, Marlène Zarader, Zeev Levy, Ephraim Meir, Yudit Greenberg, Zeljko Loparic, Roberto Walton, E.J. Stein et al.
- Hermeneutics and Philosophia Prima: Festschrift for Ernildo Stein. Co-Edited with Draiton de Souza. Ijuí, 2006. Includes contributions by Ernst Tugendhat, Hans Ineichen, John Sallis, Manfred Frank, Scarlett Marton, William J. Richardson et al.
- Phenomenology Today. Co-Edited with Ricardo Timm de Souza. Porto Alegre, 2001. Includes contributions by Klaus Held, Heinz Leonardy, Donn Welton, Zeljko Loparic, Jens Soentgen, Roberto Walton, Pierre Kerszberg, E.J. Stein, Lee Hardy et al.
- Phenomenology Today, Volume 2: Meaning and Language. Co-Edited with Ricardo Timm de Souza. Porto Alegre, 2002. Includes contributions by John Caputo, Dominique Janicaud, H. Ineichen, Donn Welton, Gerd Bornheim, Zeljko Loparic, J. Soentgen, E.J. Stein et al.
- Justice & Politics: Festschrift for Otfried Höffe. Co-Edited with Draiton de Souza. Porto Alegre, 2003. Includes contributions by Otfried Höffe, Hans-Georg Flickinger, Dick Howard, Wolfgang Kuhlmann, Jean-Christophe Merle, Thomas Pogge, Alessandro Pinzani, et al.
