= Ježić =

Ježić is a Serbo-Croatian surname, derived from the word jež, meaning "hedgehog". Its bearers are mostly ethnic Croats. It may refer to:

- Josip Ježić (1899–1981), Croatian veterinarian, microbiologist, immunologist
- Katarina Ježić (born 1992), Croatian handball player
- Mislav Ježić (born 1952), Croatian philosopher and Indologist
- Slavko Ježić (1895–1969), Croatian writer, historian and translator
- Zdravko Ježić (1931–2005), Croatian chemist and waterpolo player

== See also ==
- Jezić, surname
- Jažić, surname
