= Zagorka Golubović =

Serbian philosopher, anthropologist, and sociologist (1930–2019)

Zagorka Golubović Загорка Голубовић
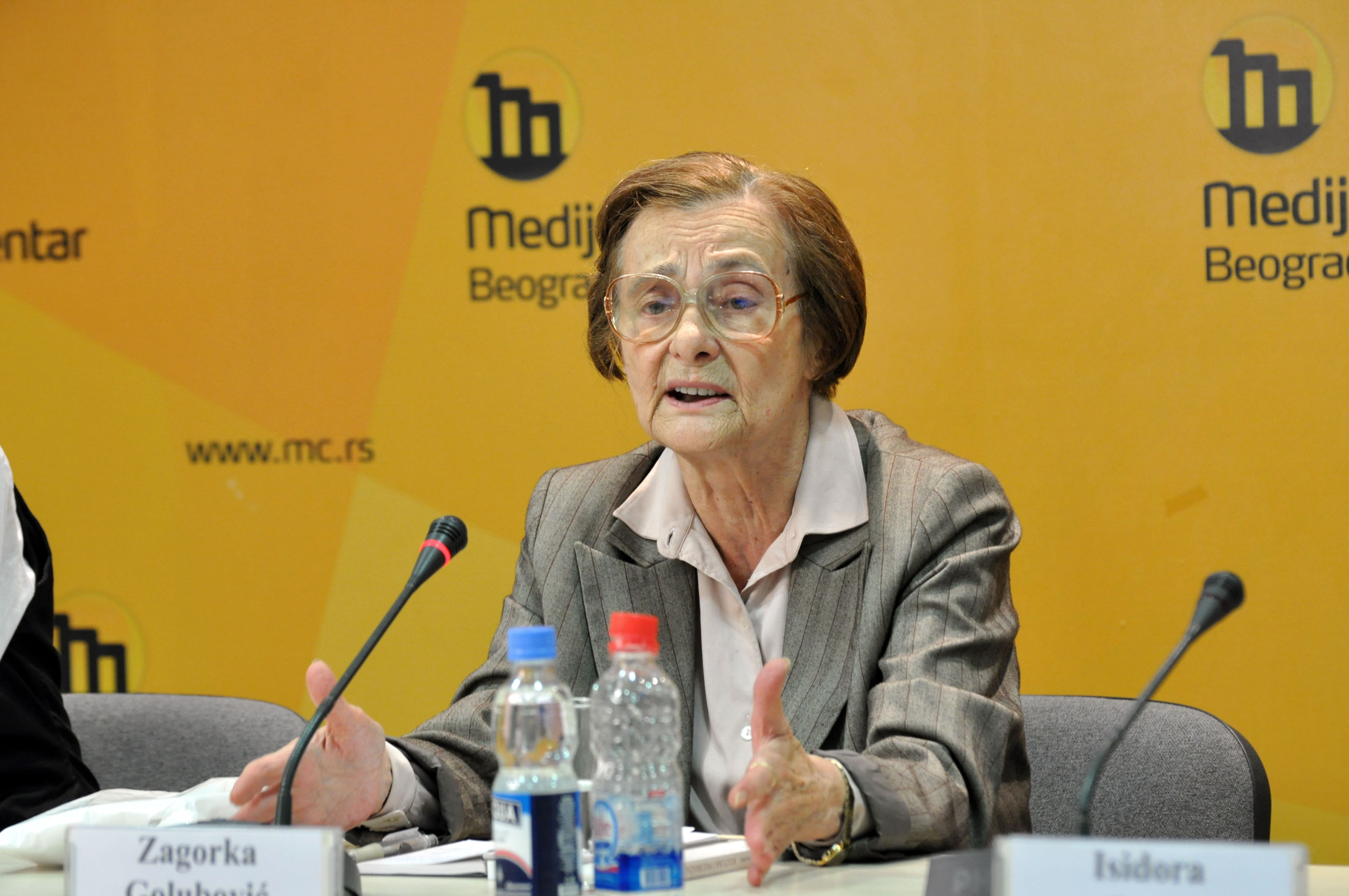
- Golubović at the "Arts and the transformation of Serbia" roundtable in September 2008.
- Born: 8 March 1930; Debrc, Drina Banovina, Kingdom of Yugoslavia
- Died: 13 March 2019 (aged 89); Belgrade, Serbia
- Citizenship: Yugoslav, Serbian
- Education: Faculty of Philosophy in Belgrade
- Occupations: philosopher, anthropologist and sociologist

Zagorka Golubović (8 March 1930 – 13 March 2019) was a Serbian philosopher, anthropologist and sociologist.

== Biography ==
Golubović was among the group of eight university professors, members of the Praxis school (Mihailo Marković, Ljubomir Tadić, Svetozar Stojanović, Miladin Životić, Dragoljub Mićunović, Nebojša Popov and Trivo Inđić), who were in January 1975 expelled from the University of Belgrade's Faculty of Philosophy on the basis of a decision of the SR Serbia People's Assembly.

She was an advisory board member and contributor of the former Yugoslavia-wide regional left-wing journal Novi Plamen from 2007.

She died after a long illness at 89 on 13 March 2019.
