= Milan Damnjanović =

Milan Damnjanović may refer to:

- Milan Damnjanović (philosopher) (1924–1994), philosopher, professor at the Faculty of Fine Arts of University of Belgrade
- Milan Damnjanović (physicist) (born 1953), Serbian physicist, professor at the Faculty of Physics of the University of Belgrade
