= Miloje Grbin =

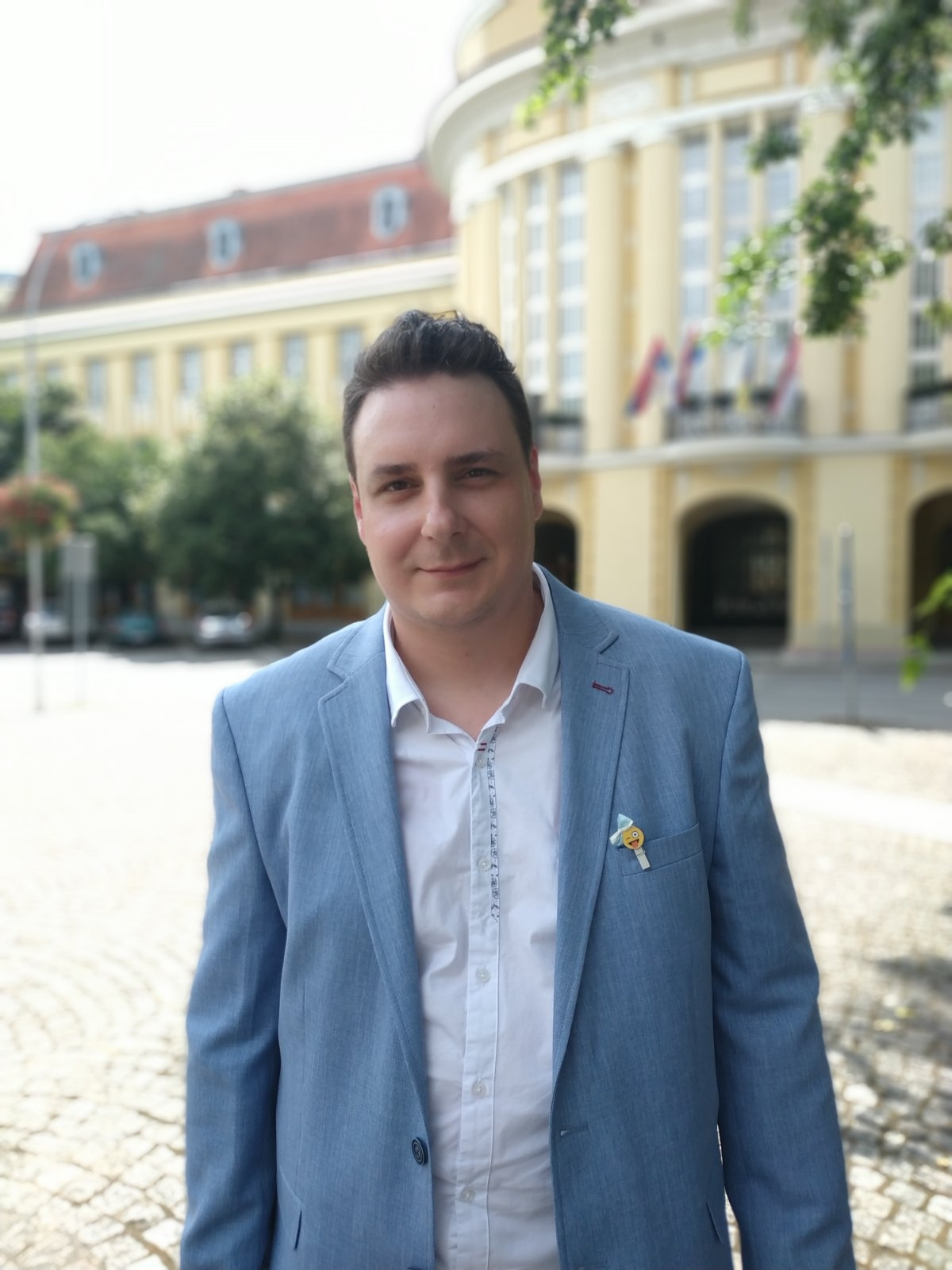
- Miloje Grbin, 2021.
- Born: 1985; Senta, SFR Yugoslavia
- Died: 12 June 2022 (aged 36–37); Čoka, Serbia

Miloje Grbin (Serbian Cyrillic: Милоје Грбин; 1985 – 12 June 2022) was a Serbian sociologist and poet.

== Biography ==
Miloje Grbin was born in Senta, ⁣Serbia. He pursued his studies at the Faculty of Philosophy in Belgrade and the Bauhaus University in Weimar. His academic work focused on urban sociology and the philosophy of space. Grbin taught sociology at a high school in Senta. Beyond his professional life, he painted, played guitar, and wrote poetry. He lived and worked in Čoka.

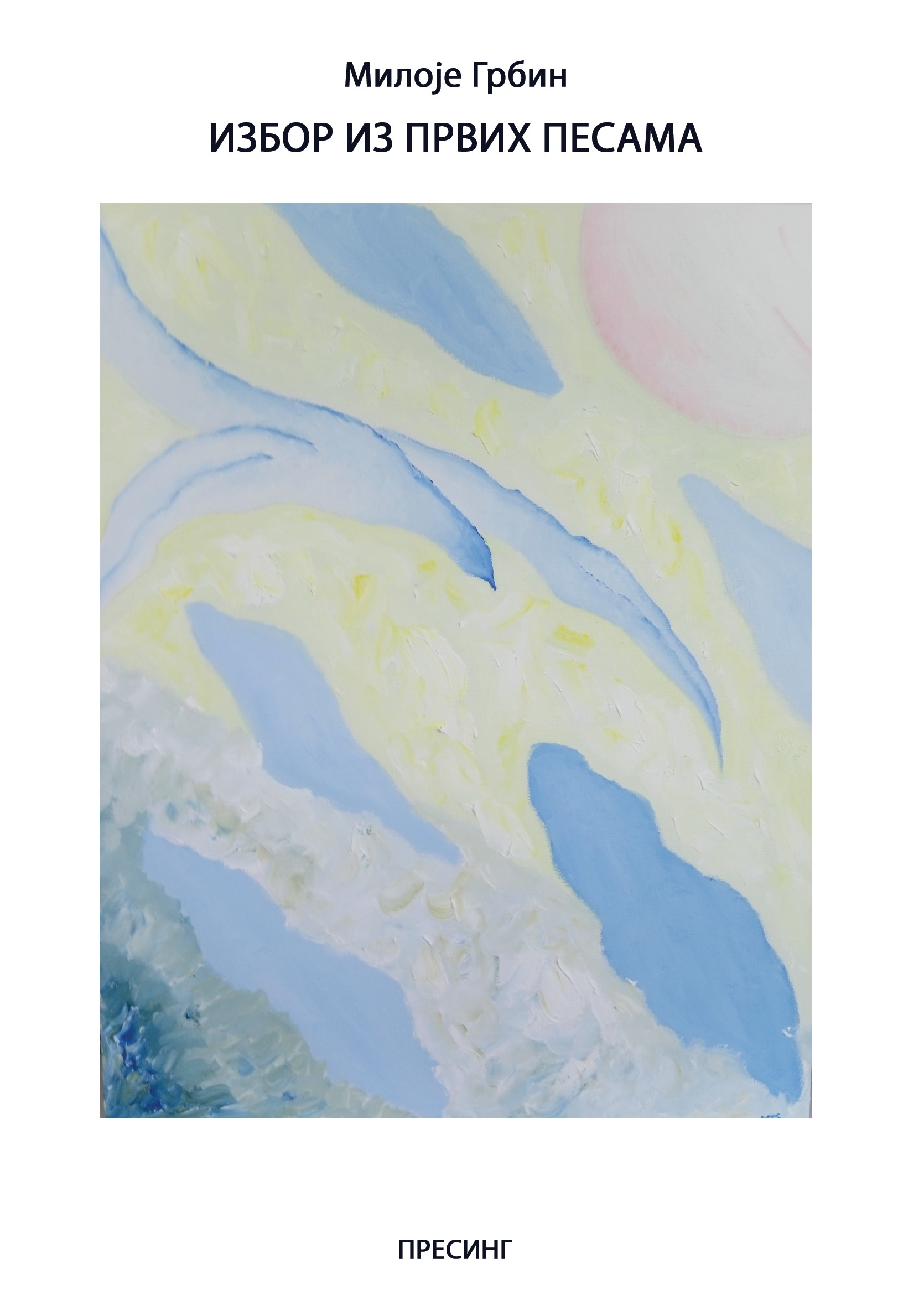
The cover of the collection Selection from Early Poems

== Poetry collection - Selection from Early Poems ==
The poems in this collection are inspired by the natural world. In the smallest events around him, the poet finds reflections of life’s essential processes. Modern humanity yearns for freedom and open horizons, but remains bound by its own concrete barriers. Themes of transience and melancholy gently fade away in the water and grass of the poet's native landscape.

== Bibliography ==
- Selection from Early Poems(Izbor iz prvih pesama), Mladenovac, 2021,
- Miloje Grbin - Zemun, in: Poetry Collection: Šraf, 2021, no. 5, editor Dušan Opačić, Belgrade, 2021,
- Miloje Grbin in: Poetry Collection: Šraf, 2022, no. 6, editor Dušan Opačić, Belgrade, 2022,
- Miloje Grbin (2015), Foucault and Space, Sociological Review, vol. XLIX (2015), no. 3, pp. 305–312,
- Grbin, M. (2013), Lefebvre's Thought in Contemporary Urban Sociology, Sociology, 55(3), 475–491.
