= Milan Damnjanović (philosopher) =

Serbian philosopher

Milan Damnjanović (1924–1994) (Serbian Cyrillic Милан Дамњановић) was a Serbian philosopher, full professor at the Faculty of Fine Arts of Belgrade University.

Milan Damnjanović was the founder and the president of the Aesthetic Society of Serbia (1980-1994), vice president of the International Aesthetics Society, a member of the International Committee of Greek Humanistic Society for Philosophy in Athens, a member of the presiding committee of the International Society for Dialectic Philosophy (Societas Hegeliana), a member of the American Aesthetics Society.

== Works ==
- Aesthetics and Disappointment (1970)
- An outline of a Philosophy of Poetry (1971);
- The Essence and the History (1976);
- 'La Sens de la Morale Esthétique', Revue d'esthétique 3 (1980). In French.
- Creating and Understanding Technological Art, Proceedings of the IXth International Congress of Aesthetics, (editor) (1983)
- Rationality Against Rationalism (1984)
- Tendencies in modern aesthetics (1984)
- Phenomenon Film (1985)
- Dealing With Multiplicity (1990)

== See also ==
- Simo Elaković
