= Milan Budimir =

Serbian classical scholar

- Милан Будимир
- Born: November 2, 1891; Jurkovo Selo, Žumberak, Austro-Hungarian Empire
- Died: 17 October 1975 (aged 84)

Academic background
- Education: University of Vienna (PhD)

Milan Budimir (Serbian Cyrillic: Милан Будимир; 2 November 1891 – 17 October 1975) was a Serbian classical scholar.

== Life ==
Budimir was born in Mrkonjić Grad, Austria-Hungary (now in Republika Srpska, Bosnia and Herzegovina). He studied Classical Philology at the University of Vienna, where he received his PhD in 1920. He was appointed an assistant that same year and soon the assistant professor at the Department of the University of Belgrade Faculty of Philosophy, before being appointed senior lecturer in 1928 and full professor in 1938. As the professor and the head of the Department of the Classical Philology, he worked until retirement in 1962, with interruptions during the German occupation in World War II.

As a researcher of high rank, he was elected a corresponding member of the Serbian Academy of Sciences and Art in 1948 and became a regular member of the same Academy in 1955. Budimir died in Belgrade on 17 October 1975.

Milan Budimir did research in the field of classical philology in all its branches: history of classical languages, especially Ancient Greek, and the history of Ancient Greek and Roman literature. He also researched the Old Balkan and Slavic languages, the history of religion, the heritage of the classical period in Serbia and Balkans, especially in language, literature and folklore, as well as the research in the field of linguistics.

He started and edited the Balkan magazine Revue internationale des Études balkaniques along with Petar Skok between the wars. Budimir was a founder and co-editor of the former main journal of Yugoslav philologists The Living Classical Periods with the most distinguished Yugoslav classical philologists.

== Currents of pre-Indo-European Researches ==
The scientific opus of Milan Budimir includes several hundreds of works, books, studies, treatises and articles which may be divided into five big groups.

The first group consists of the works dealing with the research of pre-classical languages and cultures in the Balkans, Asia Minor and the Apennines. Milan Budimir's chief merit in this field relates to the gathering and explaining of the voluminous lexical material of the languages of the pre-Greek Indo- Europeans, as well as to the establishing of the phonetic laws of these languages.

According to the literary tradition, these, pre- Greek ancients are called the Pelasgians (Πελασγοί), but Milan Budimir calls them (Πελάσται), proceeding from the form Πελαστικέ (which appears in the scholias of Homer's Iliad 16, 223), from the onomastic material in the field (Παλαιστή, toponym in Epirus; Palaestinus, older name for Strymon etc.), as well as from some common nouns proved by evidence (Πενέσται, name for the conquered population in classical Thessaly; Πελάσται, name for the farmers bound to the land in Attic).

The second group consists of the works presenting the research concerning special relations between the pre-Greek idioms and the Slavonic languages; more precisely, the ProtoSlavonic language.

The third group consists of the works dealing with the research of the general phonetic laws of the Indo-European languages, especially of the languages in contact.

The fourth group consists of the works dealing with the research in the field of classical literature, with special emphasis on the pre-Greek origin of some literary genres and the European scene.

The fifth group consists of the works researching the cultural relations in the folklore of the South Slavs and the classical peoples; these works are in close connection with the second group of Budimir's works.

== Selected works ==
Milan Budimir presented and published results of his research which entered the best-known dictionaries and reference books in more than two hundred articles, discussions, studies and books with the following being the most important (titles given in English do not necessarily mean that an actual English translation has been published):

- From the Classical and Contemporary Aloglotty (1933)
- On the Iliad and its Poet (1940)
- Grci i Pelasgi ("The Greeks and the Pelasgians"), Serbian Academy of Arts and Sciences, Department of Literature and Language, book 2, Belgrade (1950)
- The Problem of Beech and Protoslav Homeland (1951)
- Pelasto - Slavica (1956)
- Die Sprache als Schopfoung und Entwicklung (1957)
- Protoslavica (1958)
- Zur psychologischen Einheit unserer Ilias (1963)
- From the Balkan Sources (1969)
