= Ivan Ejub Kostić =

Serbian political scientist and islamologist

- Иван Ејуб Костић
- Born: 1979 (age 46–47); Belgrade, SFR Yugoslavia
- Occupations: Academic, political scientist, islamologist
- Employer: Institute for Philosophy and Social Theory

Academic background
- Education: University of Belgrade

Ivan Ejub Kostić (Serbian Cyrillic: Иван Ејуб Костић; born 1979) is a Serbian political scientist and islamologist at the Institute for Philosophy and Social Theory, University of Belgrade. His research centers on contemporary Islamic political thought, Muslim communities in Southeast Europe, and minority rights.

== Early life and education ==
Kostić was born in 1979 in Belgrade. His parents were composer Voki Kostić and actress Stanislava Pešić. He studied Arabic language and literature at the Faculty of Philology at the University of Belgrade. Later, he earned his PhD in political science from the University of Belgrade's Faculty of Political Sciences. During his studies, he converted to Islam and adopted the middle name Ejub.

== Career ==
Kostić is a research fellow at the Institute of Philosophy and Social Theory, where he co-coordinates the Research Group for Religious Studies. In addition to his primary academic appointment, he is also the executive director of the Balkan Center for the Middle East and edits the digital publishing platform Algoritam.

His research focuses on contemporary Islamic political thought, religious life and Muslim communities in Southeast Europe.

== Views ==
Kostić emphasizes that Bosniaks in the Sandžak region have historically sought to act as a constructive state-building factor in Serbia by consistently offering a hand of reconciliation despite facing systemic marginalization and securitization. He argues that extremist groups like ISIS have hijacked Islamic teachings and act as terrorists who hold the broader Muslim world hostage and adds that terrorism should not be conflated with Islam, noting that militant ideologies distort traditional concepts like jihad into aggressive political agendas.

He characterizes Israel as an expansionist regional actor which enjoys full political, military and intelligence backing from the United States and the European Union. Kostić stated that escalations against Iran are part of a broader Western and Israely strategy aimed at causing the collapse of Iran, comparing it to Libya and Syria.

== Selected publications ==
- Kostić, Ivan Ejub (2025). Između vere i nacije: Pokret Mladi muslimani 1939–1990 (in Serbian). Novi Sad: Akademska knjiga. ISBN 9788662635990.
- Kostić, Ivan Ejub; Muhič Dizdarevič, Selma, eds. (2024). Roma in Central and Southeastern Europe: Navigating Muslim Identities, Challenges, and Activism. London & New York: Routledge. ISBN 9788682324881.
- Karčić, Harun; Kostić, Ivan Ejub, eds. (2020). Media Discourse on Islam in the Western Balkans. Sarajevo: Center for Advanced Studies. ISBN 9789926471378.
- Kostić, Ivan Ejub, ed. (2019). Savremena islamska misao (in Serbian). Belgrade: Balkanski centar za Bliski istok. ISBN 9788680804057.
- Kostić, Ivan Ejub, ed. (2019). Religija, verovanje i građanski identitet (in Serbian). ISBN 9788680804064.
- Kostić, Ivan Ejub; Poljarević, Emin, eds. (2026). The Wiley Blackwell Companion to Muslim Liberation Theology. Wiley-Blackwell. ISBN 9781394282487.

== See also ==
- Serb Muslims
