= Voki Kostić =

Serbian composer (1931–2010)

- Воки Костић
- Born: 21 September 1931; Belgrade, Kingdom of Yugoslavia
- Died: 29 September 2010 (aged 79); Belgrade, Serbia
- Occupation: Composer
- Children: Ivan Ejub Kostić

Vojislav "Voki" Kostić (21 September 1931 – 29 September 2010) was one of the most prolific Serbian composers. He was particularly noted for his memorable film and TV pieces, including movies such as Nevinost bez zaštite, Ko to tamo peva, Balkanski špijun, Život je lep, and Tri karte za Holivud.

== Biography ==
Kostić was born in Belgrade, to father Aleksandar and mother Smilja, both French-educated medical doctors and recipients of Legion d'honeur. During World War II, his elder brother Vanja joined the Chetniks and died fighting the Partisans in 1942.

After the war, teenager Kostić was caught printing and distributing materials against the Yugoslav communist regime, which landed him in jail with a three-year sentence. He ended up serving two.

He composed 93 pieces of classical music, as well as music for 107 feature and TV films, 310 theater shows and 20 TV series. He was a long-time secretary of Union of Serbian composers, and published 35 papers, essays and studies. He was also noted for his culinary abilities, and he published several cookbooks and hosted popular TV shows on cooking.

== Personal life ==
Kostić was married to Vera (née Nikolajević 1936-2019) who had equally diverse interests: she was a journalist, ballet dancer and rally driver. They had no children. From his relationship to actress Stanislava Staša Pešić he had a son Ivan Ejub Kostić, an Arabist who converted to Islam. He died in his native city of Belgrade in 2010, after a long illness.
