= Trivo Inđić =

Serbian political advisor (1938–2020)

Advisor to the President of Serbia for Political Issues
- In office 2004–2012
- President: Boris Tadić

Ambassador of the Federal Republic of Yugoslavia to Spain
- In office 2001–2004

Personal details
- Born: 1938 Sanski Most, Yugoslavia (now Bosnia and Herzegovina)
- Died: 10 May 2020 (aged 82) Belgrade, Serbia
- Other political affiliations: Praxis School

Trivo Inđić (1938 — 10 May 2020) was a Serbian academic, diplomat, and political advisor who served as an official Advisor to the President of Serbia for political issues, appointed by Boris Tadić.

== Early life and education ==
Inđić was born in Lušci Palanka near Sanski Most, Kingdom of Yugoslavia (modern Bosnia & Herzegovina), orphaned during WW2. After the war, he spend some time in orphanage in Split before moving to live with a relative in Belgrade. He wanted to study chemistry, building a small lab in the basement of Čika Ljubina Street 17, but family insisted that he read law for better employment prospects. He was a graduated lawyer, and earned a master's degree in social studies. He reached the upper echelons of Yugoslav Youth politics, travelling to Latin America in the early 1960s. He was expelled from the Communist Party after joining the student protests in 1968 and became a member of a dissident group Praxis School, with Ljubomir Tadić, for which he was expelled from the University of Belgrade Faculty of Philosophy in 1975, along with seven other professors (Tadić, Nebojša Popov, Zagorka Golubović, Miladin Životić, Dragoljub Mićunović, Sveta Stojanović, and Mihailo Marković). Therefore, he was unable to complete his PhD on Pound's legal theory and surprisingly was the only Praxis group member excluded from the founding team of Institute for Social Theory and Philosophy hosting all other members.

== Career ==
He worked as a sociologist researcher at the Institute for Studying Cultural Development, the Institute for International Politics and Economics and the Institute for European Studies in Belgrade. He was the assistant federal minister for education and culture of the FR Yugoslavia from 1992 to 1994, and the ambassador of the FR Yugoslavia to Spain from 2001 to 2004.

He has published several papers in sociology, social theory and international relations, as well as books: "Culture and Cultural Politics", "The Cultural Life of the Working Youth", "Modern Spain", "The Rise of the Masses", "Market for Works of Visual Art", "For A New Enlightenment", "The Balkans - The Capabilities of the Regional Security System". He was editor of the magazine "Vidici" (Panorama), "Gledišta" (Views), "Sociološki pregled" (Sociological Review), "Kultura" (Culture), and of the "Libertas" edition on political philosophy issued by the "Filip Višnjić" publishing house from Belgrade.

Inđić spoke English, Spanish, Russian, Italian and French. He became the political advisor to the President of the Republic of Serbia in 2004, serving until the president left office in 2012.

== Death ==
Inđić died on 10 May 2020 in Belgrade, Serbia at the age of 82.
