= Praxis School =

Marxist humanist philosophical movement

The Praxis school was a Marxist humanist philosophical circle whose members were influenced by Western Marxism. It originated in Zagreb in the SFR Yugoslavia, during the 1960s.

Praxis school theorists included Milan Kangrga, Gajo Petrović, and Predrag Vranicki of Zagreb as well as Mihailo Marković of Belgrade and many others. From 1964 to 1974 they published the Marxist journal Praxis, which was renowned as one of the leading international journals in Marxist theory. The group also organized the widely popular Korčula Summer School in the island of Korčula.

== Basic tenets ==
Due to the tumultuous sociopolitical conditions in the 1960s, the affirmation of 'authentic' Marxist theory and praxis, and its humanist and dialectical aspects in particular, was an urgent task for philosophers working across the SFRY. There was a need to respond to the kind of modified Marxism–Leninism enforced by the League of Communists of Yugoslavia (see Titoism). To vocalize this need, the program of Praxis school was defined in the first issue of Praxis (Why Praxis?). Predrag Vranicki ("On the problem of Practice") and Danko Grlić ("Practice and Dogma") expanded this program in the same issue.

The Praxis philosophers considered Leninism and Stalinism to be apologetic due to their ad hoc nature. Leninist and Stalinist theories were considered to be unfaithful to the Marxist theory, as they were adjusted according to the needs of the party elite and intolerant of ideological criticism.

The defining features of the school were: 1) emphasis on the writings of the young Marx; and 2) call for freedom of speech in both East and West based upon Marx's insistence on ruthless social critique. As Erich Fromm has argued in his preface to Marković's work From Affluence to Praxis, the theory of the Praxis theoreticians was to "return to the real Marx as against the Marx equally distorted by right wing social democrats and Stalinists".

Different theorists emphasized different aspects of the theory. Where Gajo Petrović writes of philosophy as radical critique of all existing things, emphasizing the essentially creative and practical nature of human beings, Mihailo Marković writes of alienation and the dynamic nature of human beings. Milan Kangrga emphasizes creativity as well, but also the understanding of human beings as producers humanizing nature.

The Praxis School critiqued the implementation of socialist self-management in Yugoslavia, arguing that the expansion of bureaucratic power in the Yugoslav economy was because Yugoslav workers' self-management was not sufficiently implemented.

Another important feature of the Praxis theory is the incorporation of existential philosophy into the Praxis brand of Marxist social critique, spearheaded by Rudi Supek.

Organizing Korčula Summer School and publishing the international edition of Praxis were ways to promote open inquiry in accordance with these postulates. Erich Fromm's collection of articles from 1965 entitled Socialist Humanism: An International Symposium has been of much help in promoting the Praxis school abroad. As many as six members of the Praxis school have published articles in this collection: Marković, Petrović, Danilo Pejović, Veljko Korać, Rudi Supek and Predrag Vranicki.

Although the tolerance for dissent from orthodox Communist thought afforded to the Praxis School in Yugoslavia was unusual, it had its limits. When University of Belgrade students held mass demonstrations in 1968 against poor living conditions, authoritarianism, unemployment and the Vietnam War with the support of eight academics associated with the Praxis School, Tito urged that they be sacked on the grounds that they were "corrupting" their students, although the Belgrade Eight (as they became known) narrowly held on to their jobs.

== The Praxis journal ==
The Praxis journal was published by a group of praxis theoreticians, mainly from the departments of Philosophy and Sociology at Zagreb University and the Philosophy department at Belgrade University. It was established as the successor to a previous political journal, Pogledi, which was published in Zagreb for three years in the 1950s before being disbanded due to state suppression. Praxis was published in two editions: Yugoslav (in Serbo-Croatian) and foreign (in multiple languages). The first issue of the Yugoslav edition was published on 1 September 1964 and was published until 1974. As for the foreign edition, it was published between 1965 and 1973. Its founders were Branko Bošnjak, Danko Grlić, Milan Kangrga, Rudi Supek, Gajo Petrović, Predrag Vranicki, Danilo Pejović and Ivan Kuvačić. The first editors of the journal were Petrović and Pejović, but in 1966 Pejović resigned from Praxis. After that, Supek was the co-editor of the journal together with Petrović. In January 1974 Supek also resigned and was replaced by Kuvačić as the co-editor of Praxis.

Praxis has helped to restore the creative potential of Marxism. It drew inspiration from the works of Antonio Gramsci, Karl Korsch, Georg Lukács, Ernst Bloch, Herbert Marcuse, Erich Fromm and Lucien Goldmann. The texts in the magazine featured articles by writers from both the East and the West. Praxis editors had a strong tendency to publish articles that went against the Leninist theory and praxis promoted and enforced by the League of Communists of Yugoslavia. They also advocated freedom of speech and of the press. According to Praxis School member Žarko Puhovski, Praxis articles on controversial areas such as politics and ideology were often disguised as writings about more abstract topics such as aesthetics or ontology.

== Korčula Summer School ==
Korčula Summer School was preceded by a symposium organized by Gajo Petrovic and Milan Kangrga in the summer of 1963 in Dubrovnik. The summer school was organized by the publishers of the journal Praxis from 1964 to 1974 in the Croatian island of Korčula, with the exception of 1966, when the gathering was cancelled due to the intense attacks by the League of Communists of Croatia.

The school was a meeting place for philosophers and social critics from the entire world. Some of the prominent attendees included Ernst Bloch, Eugen Fink, Erich Fromm, Herbert Marcuse, Jürgen Habermas, Henri Lefebvre, Richard J. Bernstein and Shlomo Avineri, to name a few. Other notable participants included A. J. Ayer, Norman Birnbaum, Georg Henrik von Wright, and Lucien Goldmann. Another peculiarity is that one of the attendants was from the Vatican, Father Gustav Wetter, which testifies to the fact that Korčula Summer School was not merely a Marxist symposium – the attendees held interests ranging from phenomenology to theology.

The articles produced during the meeting were published in the journal during the following year. Each summer, the gathering focused on a particular topic:

- 1963: Progress and Culture (held in Dubrovnik)
- 1964: Meaning and Perspectives of Socialism
- 1965: What is History?
- 1966: The summer school was canceled due to the intense attacks by the League of Communists of Croatia
- 1967: Creativity and Creation
- 1968: Marx and Revolution
- 1969: Power and Humanity
- 1970: Hegel and Our Time (celebrating the anniversary of 200 years since Hegel's birth)
- 1971: Utopia and Reality
- 1972: Freedom and Equality
- 1973: The Essence and Limits of Civil Society
- 1974: Art in a Technologized World

== Suppression ==
Due to its critical nature – some party ideologues referred to the editors and authors of Praxis as "professional anti-Communists" and "enemies of self-managing socialism" – the journal was banned on several occasions. By 1975 it became impossible to publish the journal under the increasingly repressive conditions in SFRY.

In the same year, in January, the aforementioned Belgrade Eight (Mihailo Marković, Ljubomir Tadić, Zagorka Golubović, Svetozar Stojanović, Miladin Životić, Dragoljub Mićunović, Nebojša Popov and Trivo Inđić) were expelled from the Faculty of Philosophy in Belgrade on the basis of a decision of the Serbian Assembly. Some of the Eight taught abroad: Marković took up a part-time position at the University of Pennsylvania, whilst Stojanović worked at the University of California, Berkeley and the University of Kansas. Although the Zagreb Praxisists were treated less harshly, they still faced restrictions: Puhovski was unable to publish for two years. During subsequent years, the Praxisists organised underground meetings in private homes, which they dubbed the "Free University": however these were at risk of police interruption.

== Praxis International journal ==
The Praxis members tried in several occasions to resume publishing of Praxis and reopening Korčula Summer School. Their efforts failed, which was the main motive for several Praxis members from Belgrade to try to publish the journal abroad. They succeeded in achieving this and by April 1981, the Praxis International journal was edited and published in Oxford in the spirit of the original Praxis journal. However, not all Praxis members supported this move. This move was supported by four members of the editorial board of the Praxis: Supek, Marković, Tadić and Stojanović. The majority of the Praxis theorists, however, led by Kangrga, disagreed on the basis of the fact that an international journal with the same or similar name as the original journal would reduce the possibilities of republishing the journal inside Yugoslavia. First co-editors of Praxis International were Richard J. Bernstein and Mihailo Marković. From 1986 the co-editors were Seyla Benhabib and Svetozar Stojanović.

Praxis International was published until January 1994 when it continued to be published under the name Constellations: An International Journal of Critical and Democratic Theory.

== Aftermath ==
As inter-ethnic tensions in Yugoslavia rose, some of the Belgrade Praxisists turned towards Serbian nationalism. In 1986, Marković, Tadić and Golubović, along with writer and Praxis associate Dobrica Ćosić, signed a petition in support of Kosovo Serbs, who had made allegations that they were being persecuted by the ethnic Albanian community there: the petition implied support for removing the region's autonomous status. Marković was also a co-author of the SANU Memorandum, which has been described as the catalyst for Slobodan Milošević's rise to power.

In 1990, Praxis International published an article by Marković on Kosovo in which he claimed that the high birthrate among the Albanian community in the province was a plot by Albanian nationalists against the Serb population, and that despite their poverty, the Kosovo Albanians had historically had support from powerful allies against the Serbian community, including the Ottoman Empire, Austria-Hungary, Italy, the Catholic Church, the United Kingdom, the Comintern, the United States, Pan-Islamists, Albania and bureaucrats in the Yugoslav government. He proposed a reduction in financial investment in the province and the introduction of a family planning program, "in a gentle and psychologically acceptable way, and by the Albanians themselves, using primarily educational means". Seyla Benhabib subsequently stated that the publication of the article was the one editorial decision she regretted at Praxis International: in a 1999 interview she explained that whilst she was aware of tensions in Kosovo, she lacked knowledge regarding the situation, and the commissioning of the article was an attempt to remedy this. Looking back, she highlighted the article's invoking of the Albanians as a demographic threat as its most striking feature: "This is cliche neo-fascist thinking, racist thinking about an oppressed group. You will find racists everywhere saying the same thing". The outbreak of the Yugoslav Wars shortly afterwards drove a wedge between the Belgrade Praxisists and their western collaborators: by this time Marković had been appointed vice-president of Milošević's Socialist Party of Serbia, and served as its ideologue. This divide eventually led to the end of the journal under its original name.

Of the other Belgrade Praxisists, Stojanović became chief adviser to Ćosić when the latter was appointed President of the Federal Republic of Yugoslavia by Milošević in 1992. Tadić and Mićunović formed the Democratic Party in 1990. Although Tadić was a leader of the opposition to Milošević in Serbia, he was an uncritical supporter of Radovan Karadžić, the President of the Republika Srpska in Bosnia: in 1996 he and Marković signed a petition urging the International Criminal Tribunal for the former Yugoslavia to drop charges against Karadžić, describing him as "the true leader of all Serbs".

However, some of the Belgrade Praxisists maintained opposition to the nationalist turn: Popov founded the liberal Civic Alliance of Serbia, whilst Životić (who had moved away from Marxism towards post-structuralism in the 1980s) founded the Belgrade Circle, an NGO dedicated to inter-ethnic dialogue and peace activism, in collaboration with Tito protege-turned veteran dissident Milovan Djilas. Of the Zagreb Praxisists, Puhovski became a leading member of the Croatian Helsinki Committee, and spoke out against ethnic cleansing campaigns by the Croatian Army.

== Influence ==
The influence of the Praxis school is mainly through its intellectual legacy as a heterodox interpretation of Marxism. This interpretation has been popular among Western Marxists and academics, notably Marshall Berman, who references the Praxis group in his major works. Many praxis theoreticians taught at various universities in Europe and US. The Praxis approach was appealing to Western academia due to its emphasis on the dialectical, humanist Marx.

== See also ==
- Budapest School
- Critical theory
- New class
- Novi Plamen, a new journal drawing from the Praxis tradition
- Praxis intervention
