= Heda Festini =

Croatian philosopher (1928–2018)

Heda Festini (4 November 1928 – 18 July 2018) was a Croatian philosopher who specialized in analytic philosophy and the history of Croatian philosophy.

== Academic career ==
Festini was born in Osijek. She graduated from the University of Zagreb in 1952 and received her Ph.D. in 1965. She was a professor of philosophy at the University of Zadar where she taught theoretical philosophy, logic and methodology (1967–92). She is the author of books on Ludwig Wittgenstein, Nicola Abbagnano, Antun Petrić and Juraj Politeo, as well as numerous articles on the philosophy of language, philosophy of science and the history of philosophy. She is also translator of works by Nicola Abbagnano and John Dewey into Croatian. Since 2013, she has been writing political commentaries for the portal alter.

== Personal life ==
She has two grandchildren, Berislav Marušić and Sanja Dembić, who are both philosophers.

== Selected bibliography ==
- Filozofija pozitivnog egzistencijalizma Nicole Abbagnana, 1967.
- Život i djelo Splićanina Jurja Politea. Zagreb: Liber, 1977.
- Antun Petrić, filozof iz Komiže. Split: Književni krug, 1992.
- Uvod u čitanje Ludwiga Wittgensteina. Zagreb: Hrvatsko Filozofsko Društvo, 1992.

== Translations ==
- Nicola Abbagnano, Mogućnost i sloboda. Beograd: Nolit, 1967. (Translation of "Possibilità e Libertà", from Italian into Croatian)
- John Dewey, Liberalizam i društvena akcija. Zagreb: Kruzak, 2004. (Translation of "Liberalism and Social Action", from English into Croatian)

== See also ==
- List of Croatian philosophers
