= Ljiljana Filipović =

Croatian author and philosopher

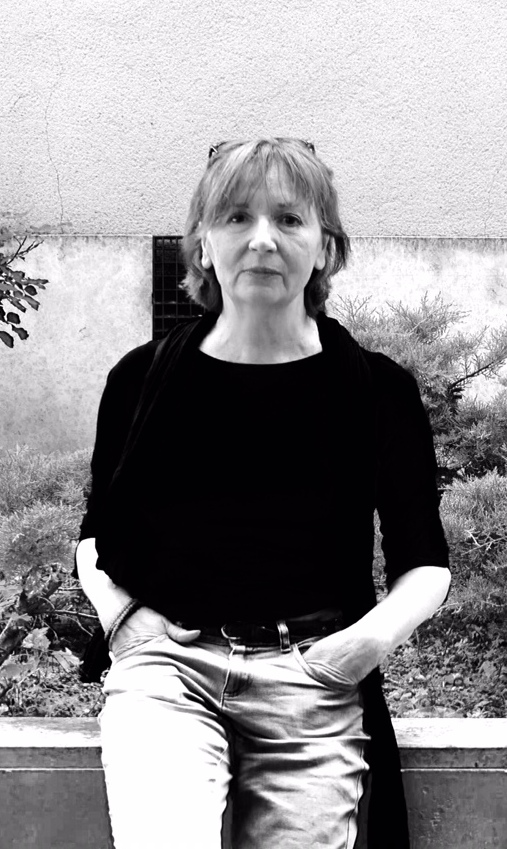
Ljiljana Filipovic

Ljiljana Filipović (born 21 January 1951 in Zagreb) is a Croatian author and philosopher.

Filipović received her Ph.D. in philosophy from the University of Zagreb. Her first published work in literature was a radio play produced by Radio Zagreb in 1973. Besides writing radio plays (for which she got several prizes from Radio Zagreb). For innovation in the radio program she received annual prize in 2002 from Croatian radio. She taught Philosophical and psychoanalytic critique of drama text at the Academy of Dramatic Art in Zagreb from 1998 until 2013 when she acquired position of the associate professor.

Filipović is the author of several philosophical books and novels as well as numerous radio plays. She has contributed regularly to a variety of Croatian and foreign cultural magazines. Her essays and articles cover topics on cultural and political phenomena that are explained through a conjunction of philosophy and psychoanalysis. She has also translated into Croatian such books.

== Selected works ==
=== Books in Croatian ===
- Filozofija i antipsihijatrija Ronalda D. Lainga [Philosophy and Anti-Psychiatry of Ronald D. Laing] (Zagreb 1990) published by Filozofska istraživanja
- Nesvjesno u filozofiji [The Unconscious in Philosophy] published by Izdanja Antibarbarus (Zagreb 1997)
- Javne samoće [Public solitudes] (essays) published by Izdanja Antibarbarus (Zagreb 2006)
- Prazne tvornice [Empty Factories] (essays) published by Izdanja Antibarbarus (Zagreb 2008)
- Scenariji kože [Skin Scenarios] (essays) published by Izdanja Antibarbarus (Zagreb 2012)
- Klub krivaca [The Guilty One's Club] published by Izdanja Antibarbarus (Zagreb 2016)

=== Novels in Croatian ===
- Nevidljivi pas [The Invisible Dog] published by Dnevnik (Novi Sad 1985)
- Sokol u šusteraju [The Hawk in the Shoe-maker's Shop] published by Ženska infoteka (Zagreb 2000)
- Nestali ljudi [Missing People] published by Profil (Zagreb 2007)

=== Works in other languages ===
- "Die Anfänge der Psychoanalyse in Zagreb (in Ambivalenz des Fin de siècle: Wien-Zagreb, Wien & Köln & Weimar: Böhlau Verlag 1998)
- "Theatre of the Unconscious" (in literature and psychology: a journal of psychoanalytic and cultural criticism, Volume 49 No. 1/2, 2003 Rhode Island College)
- "Die Psychoanalyse im Gerichtsaal" (in Psychotherapie und Psychoanalyse in Osteuropa, Uchtspringe: Sigmund-Freud-Zentrum 2003)
- "Film as abreaction of totalitarianism" (in The Couch and the Silver Screen (ed. Andrea Sabbadini; Hove and New York: Brunner-Routledge 2003)
- "Breakdown of the Collective"/ "Der Zusammenbruch des Kollektivs", (Catalog of the exhibition Collective Creativity, Kassel: Kunsthalle Fridericianum 2005)
- "What makes us laugh?" (in Maske und Kothurn 4, Wien & Köln & Weimar: Böhlau Verlag 2005)
- "Psychoanalysis, Expulsion, Exclusion", (in International Journal of Psychotherapy, Volume 12, Number 1, March 2008, Vienna: Journal of the European Association of Psychotherapy ISSN 1356-9082)
- "Philosophy - Psychiatry - Anti- Psychiatry - Non-Psychiatry" (in Extravagant Bodies: Extravagant Minds, Zagreb: Kontejner 2010)
- "More than fifty years after: Laing, Sartre & the Other" (in International Journal of Psychotherapy: 2011, Vol. 15, No. 2, pp. xx-xx: ISSN 1356-9082)
- "Eno samo besedilo v alternativnih pokrajinah" (Gledališki list 2, Slovensko narodno gledališče drama, Ljubljana 2011/12)
- "A Perfect Day for Abjection", (film mutations: the fifth festival of invisible cinema /filmske mutacije: peti festival nevidljivog filma, Zagreb 2011)
- "More than 50 years after: Laing, Sartre & the Other", (in R. D. Laing 50 years since The Divided Self, ed. Theodor Itten & Courtenay Young, Ross-on-Wye: PCCS Books 2012)
- "Der Wunsch nach Freiheit", (in Sozialwissenschaftliche Literatur Rundschau 70, Lahnstein: Verlag neue praxis Gmbh, 2015)
