= Predrag Finci =

Bosnian–British philosopher, author, and essayist (born 1946)

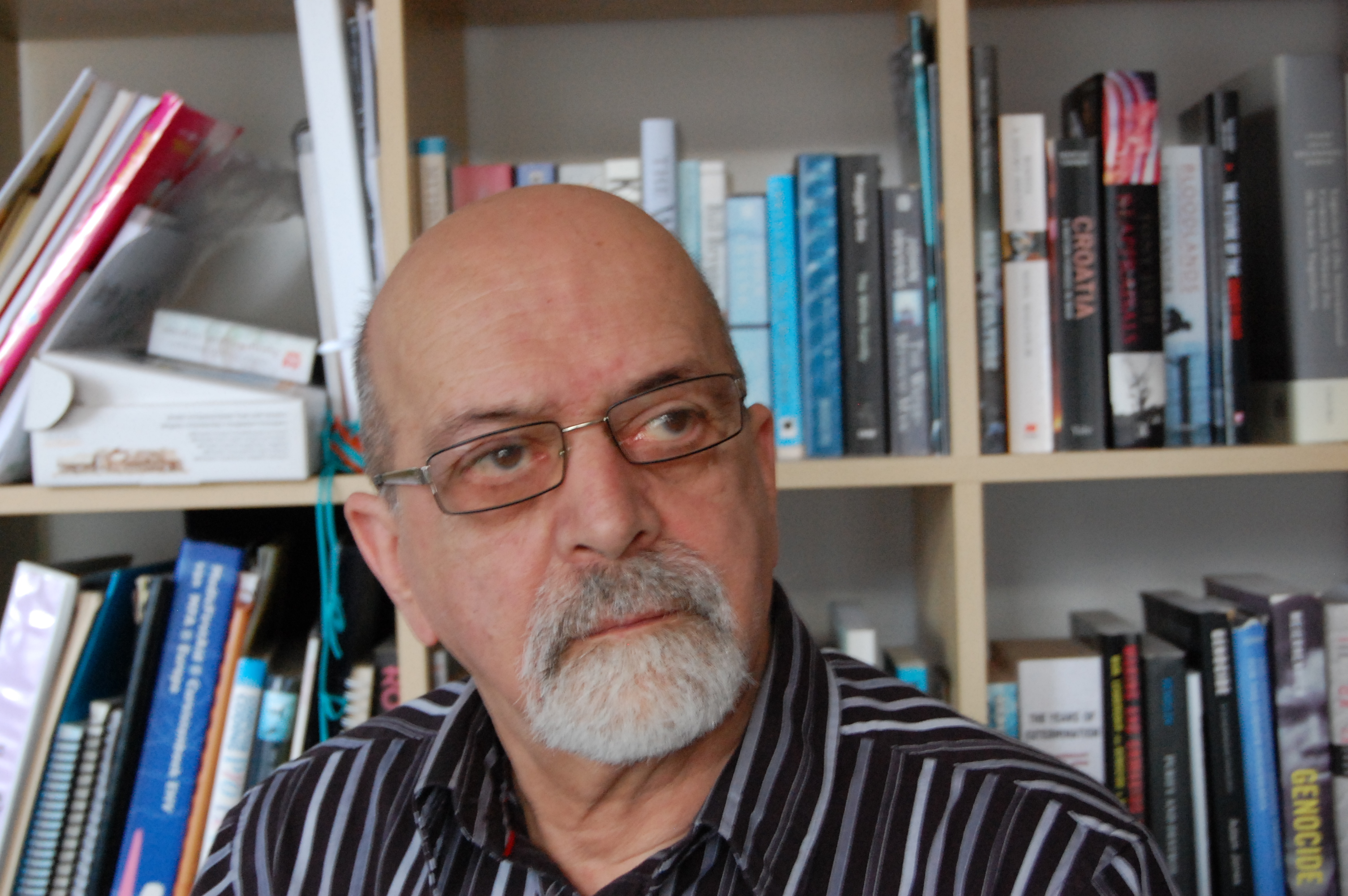
- Born: 5 August 1946 (age 80); Sarajevo, Yugoslavia (present-day Bosnia and Herzegovina)

Philosophical work
- Era: 20th-/21st-century philosophy
- Region: Western philosophy
- School: Continental philosophy, existentialism, neo-Marxism, phenomenology
- Main interests: Aesthetics, ontology

Predrag Finci (born 5 August 1946) is a Bosnian–British philosopher, author, and essayist.

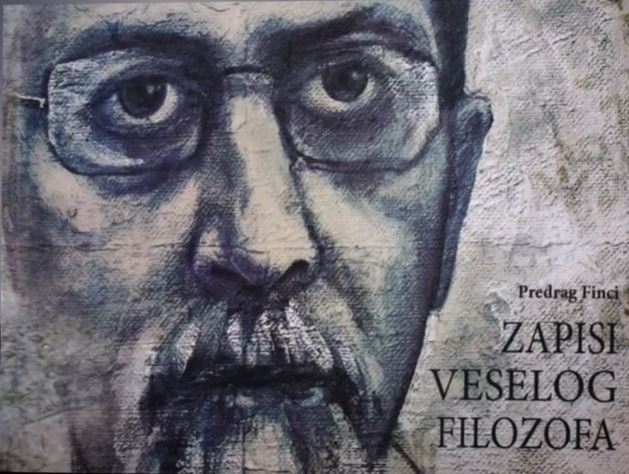
Predrag Finci by Amela Hadzimejlic. Book cover

== Biography ==
Predrag Finci started his career as an actor. In 1968 Finci played the role of Gavrilo Princip in the film Sarajevski atentat directed by Fadil Hadžić. Later he studied philosophy at the University of Sarajevo and at the University of Paris X: Nanterre under Mikel Dufrenne. He was a visiting researcher at the Freiburg University under the supervision of Werner Marx. He completed his MA in 1977 and PhD in philosophy in 1981. He was a professor of aesthetics at the University of Sarajevo until 1993 when, during the Bosnian war, he left Sarajevo for London. He has lived there since, and worked as a freelance interpreter and writer until his retirement in 2011.

== Work ==
Finci's work is based on a combination of erudition, philosophical and aesthetical insights, and personal experience. Finci writes extensively in his native language and also in English. Reviews of Finci's books have been published in Bosnia, Croatia, and Serbia. He was an honorary visiting fellow at University College London from 1999 to 2013. Predrag Finci is a member of Exiled Writers Ink! in London. He is a founder-member of Bosnian P.E.N. He is a member of the Croatian Philosophical Society. He received the Svjetlost Publisher Award in 1980 and the Veselin Maslesa Publisher Award in 1986. In 2011 he received the Science Award for his book Imaginacija (Imagination) at the 23rd International Book Fair, Sarajevo.

== Bibliography ==
In English:

- Applause, and then Silence, with an Introduction by Moris Farhi, Style Writers Now, 2012, ISBN 9781476487908
- Why I Killed Franz Ferdinand and Other Essays, with an Introduction by Cathi Unsworth, Style Writers Now, 2014, ISBN 9781310175367

Published in Bosnia:

- Govor prepiski (Discourse of Correspondence), Svjetlost, Sarajevo, 1980,
- Umjetnost i iskustvo egzistencije (Art and Experience of Existence), Svjetlost, Sarajevo, 1986,
- Ishodište pitanja (The Source of Question), Glas, Banja Luka, 1987, OCLC 23869495
- O nekim sporednim stvarima (On Some Secondary Matters), Veselin Maslesa, Sarajevo,1990,ISBN 9788621004249
- Sarajevski zapisi (Sarajevo's Notes), Buybook, Sarajevo 2004, ISBN 9789958630323
- Poetozofski eseji (Poetosophic Essays), Medjunarodni centar za mir, Sarajevo, 2004, ISBN 9789958480430
- O kolodvoru i putniku (About Stations and Travellers), Motrišta, Mostar, 2013, ISSN 1512-5475; IK Rabic, Sarajevo 2015, ISBN 978-9958-33-101-5 – Translated into Hebrew and published by Carmelph.co.il, 2019 ISBN 9789655409055; translated into Italian and published in Italy La stazione e il viaggiatore, Ass. Culturale Il Foglio, 2022 ISBN 9788876068966
- Kratka, a tužna povijest uma (A Short But Sad History of Mind), IKB Rabic, Sarajevo, 2016. ISBN 9789926428037 COBIS: BH-ID 22956550
- Elektronička špilja (The Electronic Cave), Art Rabic, Sarajevo, 2017. ISBN 9789926428211 COBISS.BH.ID 23983110
- O književnosti i piscima (Of Literature and Writers), Art Rabic, Sarajevo, 2018. ISBN 978-9926-428-50-1
- Zapisi veselog filozofa. Slikovni zapisi u knjizi: Amela Hadžimejlić, (Notes of the Merry Philosopher. Visual comments by Amela Hadžimejlić), Art Rabic, Sarajevo 2019
- Prošle godine u Barnetu (Last year in Barnet), Buybook, Sarajevo 2022 ISBN 978-9958-306-74-7
- Gnome, Art Rabic, Sarajevo, 2023 ISBN 978-9926-503-33-8
- Filozofske priče ( Philosophical stories), Buybook, 2024 ISBN 978-9926-310-94-3
- Abecedarij bivšeg Sarajeva: sentimentalni uvod u estetiku (Alphabet of the Former Sarajevo: a Sentimental Introduction to Aesthetics), Buybook, Sarajevo and Zagreb 2025.ISBN 9789926311735

Published in Croatia:

- Umjetnost uništenog: estetika, rat i Holokaust (The Arts of the Destroyed. The Arts, the War and the Holocaust), Izdanja Antibarbarus, Zagreb, 2005, ISBN 9532490000
- Priroda umjetnosti (The Nature of the Arts), Izdanja Antibarbarus, Zagreb, 2006, ISBN 9789532490121
- Tekst o tuđini (The Text on Exile) illustrated by Mersad Berber, Demetra, Zagreb, 2007 – Translated into Italian and published in Italy Il popolo del diluvio, Bottega Errante Edizioni, 2018 ISBN 9788899368272
- Djelo i nedjelo: umjetnost, etika i politika (On the Arts, Ethics and Politics), Demetra, Zagreb, 2008, ISBN 9789532250916
- Imaginacija (Imagination), Zagreb, Izdanja Antibarbarus, 2009, ISBN 9789532490916
- Osobno kao tekst, (Personal as Text), Izdanja Antibarbarus, Zagreb, 2011, ISBN 9789532491081
- Čitatelj Hegelove estetike (A Reader of Hegel's Aesthetics), Naklada Breza, Zagreb, 2014, ISBN 9789537036867
- Estetska terminologija (Terminology of Aesthetics), Izdanja Antibarbarus, Zagreb, 2014, ISBN 9789532491418
- Korist filozofije (Usefulness of Philosophy), Izdanja Antibarbarus, Zagreb, 2017, ISBN 9789532491760
- Što se sviđa svima. Komentari uz Kantovo shvaćanje umjetnosti(What is Pleasing to All. Comments on Kant's Conception of the Arts), Biblioteka Filozofska istraživanja, knjiga 152, Zagreb 2019. ISBN 978-953-164-204-0
- Prvo, bitno (Prime, Essential), Factum izdavaštvo Belgrade and Jesenski and Turk Zagreb 2020. ISBN 9788680254388
- Sve dok (Until), Fraktura, Zapresic, 2021 ISBN 978-953358317-4
- U unutarnjem, istina (In the Inner, the Truth), TIM press, Zagreb 2022., ISBN 9789533690094
- Filozofske priče ( Philosophical stories), Buybook, 2024 ISBN 978-9926-310-94-3
- Abecedarij bivšeg Sarajeva: sentimentalni uvod u estetiku (Alphabet of the Former Sarajevo: a Sentimental Introduction to Aesthetics), Buybook, Sarajevo and Zagreb 2025 ISBN 9789926311735
- Estetsko u promijenjenom svijetu (Aesthetics in a Changed World), Filozofska istraživanja, Zagreb, 2025 ISBN 9789531642231
- Putovanja duše (Journeys of the Soul), TIM press, Zagreb 2026

Published in Serbia:

- Ukratko (In Short), Factum Izdavastvo, Belgrade, 2018, ISBN 9788680254128 – Translated into Hebrew and published by Carmelph.co.il, 2023 ISBN 978-965-7815-42-7
- Misterij, iza svega(Mystery Beyond Everything), Factum Izdavastvo, Belgrade, 2019 ISBN 9788680254197
- Prvo, bitno (Prime, Essential) Factum izdavaštvo Belgrade and Jesenski and Turk Zagreb 2020. ISBN 9788680254388
- Emigrantska slikovnica (An Immigrant Picture Book), U suradnji Factum izdavaštvo, Beograd i Jesenski i Turk, Zagreb 2022. ISBN 9788680254494

== Sources ==
- Interview with Predrag Finci 2012 (in Bosnian)
- Interview with Predrag Finci, 2012 (in Bosnian)
- Predrag Finci about Exile, 2012 (in Italian)
- Interview with Predrag Finci 2013 (in Croatian)
- BBC Radio 3, A Conversation with Predrag Finci 2014
- www.smashwords.com, Interview with Predrag Finci, 2014
