= Svetozar Stojanović =

Serbian philosopher and political theorist (1931–2010)

Svetozar Stojanović Светозар Стојановић
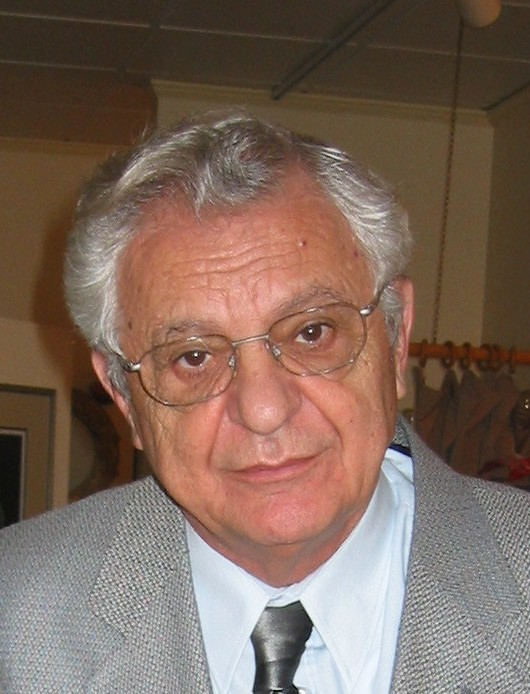
- Stojanović in December 2005
- Born: 18 October 1931; Kragujevac, Danube Banovina, Kingdom of Yugoslavia
- Died: 7 May 2010 (aged 78); Belgrade, Serbia
- Citizenship: Yugoslav, Serbian
- Education: University of Belgrade
- Occupations: Philosopher, political theorist

Svetozar "Sveta" Stojanović (Serbian Cyrillic: Светозар Стојановић; 18 October 1931 – 7 May 2010) was a Serbian philosopher and political theorist.

== Biography ==
Svetozar Stojanović was born in 1931, in Kragujevac, Kingdom of Yugoslavia (present day Serbia) and received a PhD in philosophy from the University of Belgrade in 1962. Together with seven other professors and teachers, called The Praxis Group, he was expelled from the University of Belgrade in January 1975 for dissident activities during Josip Broz Tito's regime in Yugoslavia. He returned to the University in the early nineties as socialist Yugoslavia was falling apart. From 1992 to 1993, he served as a special adviser to former Yugoslav President Dobrica Ćosić.

Stojanović was a longtime critic of Slobodan Milošević, and one of the protagonists in the October 2000 Serbian democratic revolution which culminated in the overthrow of Milošević. He was appointed to the Commission for Truth and Reconciliation by former Yugoslav President Vojislav Koštunica, and later became a member of the Council for Foreign Relations of the Ministry of Foreign Affairs of Serbia.

Stojanovic was a member of the Council for Secular Humanism's International Academy of Humanism, a member of the Paris International Institute of Philosophy (Institut International de Philosophie) and the Academy of Humanistic Studies in Moscow. In 1973 he was one of the signers of the Humanist Manifesto II. He was co-chairman of the International Humanist and Ethical Union, 1985-87. He was a long-time director of the Institute for Philosophy and Social Theory in Belgrade and the member of the governing board of Korčula Summer School. Stojanović was a visiting professor at many prominent universities in the United States, Germany, Great Britain, Austria, and India.

With Đuro Kovačević, another Serbian political theorist, Stojanović was a co-founder and president of the Serbian-American Center in Belgrade, which developed into the Center for National Strategy, and the Forum for Serbian-American Dialogue and Cooperation.

He was the chief editor of Praxis International from 1987–1990 and, most recently, a member of the editorial council of Philosophy & Social Criticism, based in Boston.

Stojanović authored seven books, four brochures, and 130 journal articles. His works have been translated into fourteen languages, including English, German, French, Russian, Spanish, and Japanese.

== Selected works ==
- Stojanovic S. (1973) Between Ideals and Reality: A Critique of Socialism and its Future. Oxford University Press
- Stojanovic S. (1981) In Search of Democracy in Socialism: History and Party Consciousness. Buffalo, NY: Prometheus Books
- Stojanovic S. (1988) Perestoika: from Marxism and Bolshevism to Gorbachev. Buffalo, NY: Prometheus Books
- Stojanovic S. (1997) The Fall of Yugoslavia: Why Communism Failed. Buffalo, NY: Prometheus Books
- Stojanovic S. (2003) Serbia: The Democratic Revolution. Buffalo, NY: Humanity Books
