= Mihailo Marković =

Serbian philosopher (1923–2010)

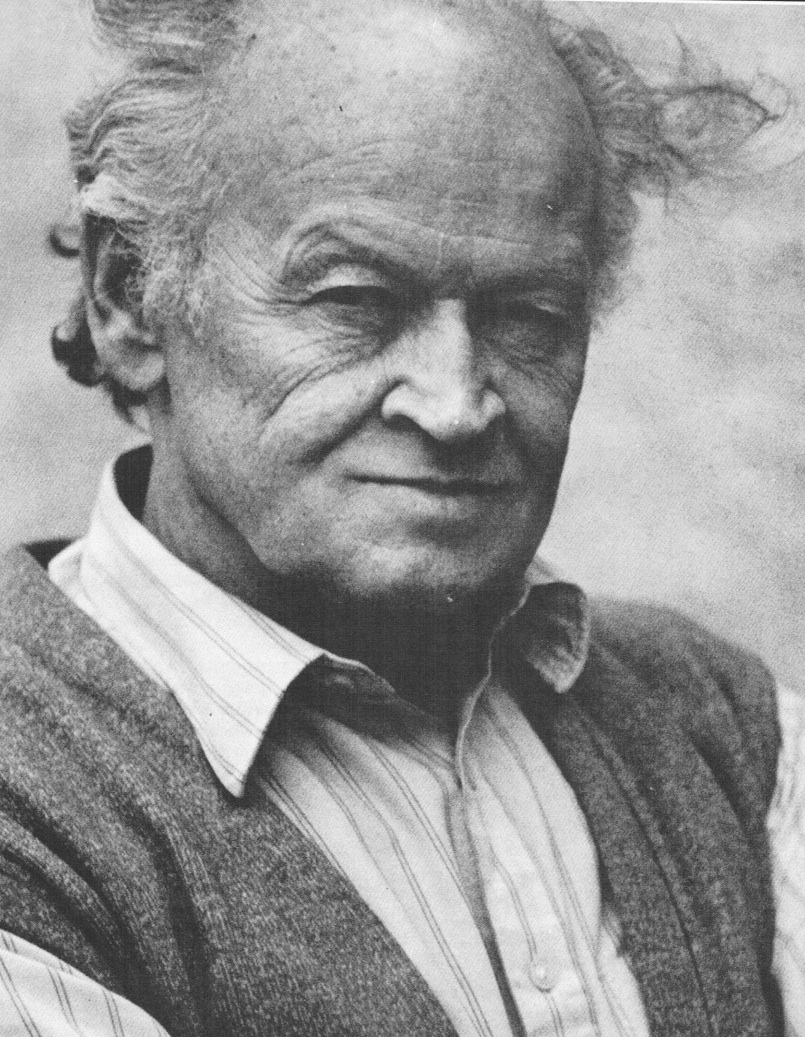
- Mihailo Marković in 1994
- Born: 24 February 1923; Belgrade, Kingdom of Serbs, Croats and Slovenes
- Died: 7 February 2010 (aged 86); Belgrade, Serbia
- Education: University of Belgrade – Faculty of Philosophy (1955); University College London (1956)
- Occupations: philosopher, writer, politician
- Years active: 1952–2010
- Known for: Praxis School; 1986 SANU Memorandum
- Political party: Socialist (1990–1995)

Mihailo Marković (Serbian Cyrillic: Михаило Марковић; 24 February 1923 – 7 February 2010) was a Serbian philosopher who gained prominence in the 1960s and 1970s as a proponent of the Praxis School, a Marxist humanist movement that originated in Yugoslavia. He was a member of the Socialist Party of Serbia, co-author of the SANU Memorandum and a prominent supporter of Slobodan Milošević's politics in the late 1980s and 1990s.

== Early life ==
Marković was born in Belgrade, Kingdom of Serbs, Croats and Slovenes. He became a member of the youth organization of the Communist Party of Yugoslavia (KPJ) in 1940, and in 1944 he became a member of the KPJ itself. As a partisan he actively participated in the struggle for liberation of Yugoslavia during World War II.

== Academic career ==
Marković took a doctorate in philosophy first at the University of Belgrade Faculty of Philosophy in 1955, and then another in 1956 at University College London. There he studied logic under A. J. Ayer, and wrote his thesis on The Concept of Logic. In 1963 he became a full professor of philosophy at the University of Belgrade's Faculty of Philosophy, and the dean of the faculty in the period 1966–1967. From 1960 to 1962 he was the president of the Yugoslav Society of Philosophy. In the 1970s, he taught at the University of Michigan at Ann Arbor and was a director of the Institute of Philosophy at the University of Belgrade. He also taught for many years at the University of Pennsylvania, first as a frequent visiting professor from 1972 to 1980 and then as an adjunct professor from 1981 to 1993. Marković was a co-Chairman of the International Humanist and Ethical Union (1975–1985). He has been a corresponding member of the Serbian Academy of Sciences and Arts since 1963 and a full member since 1983.

In his honour, a collection of articles entitled Philosophy and Society was published in Belgrade in 1987.

== Social critic ==
After the Resolution of the Informbiro condemning the Yugoslav communist regime, Marković took part in a fierce debate against Stalinist dogmatism, becoming one of the fiercest critics of the Stalinist philosophical theses. His Revision of the Philosophical Bases of Marxism in the USSR, published in 1952, was the first major attack on the Stalinist philosophy in Yugoslavia.

In the 1960s, Marković became a major proponent of the Praxis School of Marxist interpretation, which emphasized the writings of young Marx, and their dialectical and humanist aspects in particular. He also actively contributed to the international journal Praxis. Due to his critical observations, together with seven other professors from the Faculty of Philosophy in Belgrade, Marković was suspended in January 1975, and finally lost his job in January 1981. After that, Marković worked in the Institute of Social Research until his retirement in 1986.

As a member of the Serbian Academy of Sciences and Arts (SANU) in 1986, Marković, together with others, wrote the SANU Memorandum, a document that has formulated the central tenets of Serbian nationalism. While the document has been viewed in some neighbouring former Yugoslav republics as a preparation for full-scale Greater Serbian expansionism, many Serbs considered it a realistic depiction of the Serbian position within Yugoslav federation.

During the Breakup of Yugoslavia, Marković considered that the borders of the country should be changed based on ethnic and historical grounds. Marković considered that the quasi-state Republic of Serbian Krajina, eastern Slavonia, Baranya and western Syrmia should not belong to Croatia because the Serbian people have lived in these territories for most of the centuries. He also considered that "the Albanian people lack any historical reasons to support their right to Kosovo", as they did not live in the territory before the arrival of the Slavs.

== Political activity ==
Marković was vice-president of the Slobodan Milošević's Socialist Party of Serbia from 1990 to 1992, as well as its one time chief ideologue. At other times, he was a vocal critic of the official SPS party line. In November 1995 he was released from all duties in the party.

== Bibliography ==
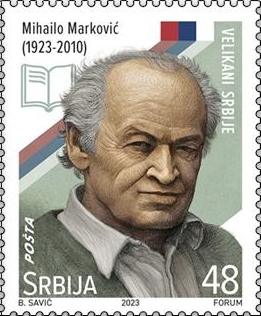
Marković on a 2023 stamp of Serbia

- Revision of the Philosophical Bases of Marxism in the USSR (1952)
- Logic (1956)
- Formalism in Contemporary Logic (1957)
- Dialectical Theory of Meaning, Belgrade 1961
- Humanism and Dialectics (1967)
- Dialektik der Praxis, Humanizm i djalektika, Suhrkamp Verlag, Frankfurt am Main, 1968
- Att utveckla socialismen, Stockholm, 1971
- From Affluence to Praxis (Philosophy and social criticism), Ann Arbor, 1974
- The Contemporary Marx, Nottingham, 1974
- Philosophical Foundations of Science, Belgrade 1982
- Selected Works in eight volumes, Belgrade, 1994
- Freedom and Praxis, Belgrade 1997
- Social Thought at the Border of Milenia, 1999
- Storming the Sky: Memoirs, 2008

== See also ==
- Simo Elaković

Academic offices
Preceded by Ivan Božić (historian)	Dean of the Faculty of Philosophy; 1966–1967	Succeeded by ?
