= Rudi Supek =

Croatian sociologist

- Born: April 8, 1913
- Died: January 2, 1993 (aged 79)
- Occupations: sociologist philosopher

Rudi Supek (8 April 1913 – 2 January 1993) was a Croatian sociologist, philosopher and a member of the Praxis School of Marxism.

== Biography ==
Born in Zagreb, Supek studied philosophy and graduated in 1937. He went on to study clinical psychology in Paris, where he was when World War II erupted. He joined the resistance movement, but soon was captured and deported to the Buchenwald concentration camp, where he took part in the Buchenwald Resistance. After the liberation, Supek went back to Paris to continue living and studying there. Between 1947 and 1950 he was an editor of the newspaper Nova Jugoslavija, which was published in Paris. In 1952 he co-founded the magazine Pogledi, which was subsequently banned by Yugoslav authorities.

Supek earned his PhD from the Sorbonne in 1952 and started to work as a professor at the Department of Psychology of the Faculty of Humanities and Social Sciences, University of Zagreb, and at the Institute for Social Research in Zagreb. He founded the Department of Sociology at the Faculty of Humanities and Social Sciences in 1963. Supek became the first president of the Yugoslav Society of Psychologists, and for a period he was the president of the Yugoslav Society of Sociologists.

In 1964 Supek and several colleagues from the Zagreb Faculty of Humanities and Social Sciences founded the Praxis journal. Supek was co-editor of the journal from 1967 to 1973. He initiated and became president of the management board of the Korčula Summer School.

In 2004, the Croatian Sociological Association established the annual Rudi Supek Award for achievements in sociology in his honour.

== Major works ==
Supek wrote many books and articles ranging from sociology to psychopathology, anthropology, and philosophy. His major works are:

- Existentialism and Decadence (1950)
- Sociology and Socialism (1962)
- Herbert Spencer and the Biologism in Sociology (1965)
- Humanist Intelligentsia and Politics (1969)
- Social Prejudices (1973)
- Participation, Workers’ Control and Self-management (1974)
- Living after History (1986)
