= Danilo Pejović =

Croatian philosopher (1928–2007)

- Born: 6 March 1928; Ludbreg, Kingdom of Serbs, Croats and Slovenes
- Died: 4 October 2007 (aged 79); Zagreb, Croatia
- Movement: Praxis

Danilo Pejović (6 March 1928 – 4 October 2007) was a Croatian philosopher.

Pejović was born in Ludbreg. During the World War II, in 1943, Pejović joined the National Liberation Army in its fight against the occupying forces of Yugoslavia. He continued his education after the war, graduating with a degree in philosophy at the University in Zagreb in 1953. He earned his PhD degree at the same university in 1958 with a dissertation about the ontology of Nicolai Hartmann. Until 1966, Pejović was president of the Croatian Philosophy Society.

Pejović was part of the wing of Yugoslav philosophical thought that was defending critical, unorthodox views. When the journal Praxis was established in 1964, Pejović joined its editorial board, becoming a co-editor of the journal, together with Gajo Petrović.

However, Pejović's cooperation with the Praxis School didn't last too long. After the attacks of the regime politicians against Praxis in summer 1966, Pejović resigned from his post as a co-editor of the Praxis and he broke his cooperation with the Praxis School, attacking his former colleagues. Later, unlike his former colleagues in Praxis, he condemned the Yugoslav student demonstrations in 1968.

== Early life ==
He was born in Ludbreg, now Croatia. His mother was German. After his parents divorced, he remained living with his mother in Croatia. He took part in part in WW2 fighting alongside Partisans, while his father did not support the movement and suffered under the new regime. He identified as Croat.

The book about his family notes that he broke all bonds with his relatives from Montenegro.

== Major works ==
- The French Philosophy of the Enlightenment (1957)
- The Real World: the foundations of the ontology of Nikolai Hartmann (1960)
- Against the Current (1965)
- System and Existence (1970)
- Farewell to Modernity (1993)
- The Spirit and the Freedom (1992)
- The Great Teachers of the Thought (2002)
