= Gajo Petrović =

Yugoslavian Marxist theorist (1927–1993)

- Гајо Петровић
- Born: 12 March 1927; Karlovac, Yugoslavia
- Died: 13 June 1993 (aged 66); Zagreb, Croatia

Academic background
- Education: University of Zagreb
- Influences: Martin Heidegger; Edmund Husserl; Karl Marx

Academic work
- Discipline: Philosophy
- School or tradition: Praxis school
- Institutions: University of Zagreb

Gajo Petrović (Serbian: Гајо Петровић; 12 March 1927 – 13 June 1993) was one of the main theorists in the Marxist humanist Praxis School in the Socialist Federal Republic of Yugoslavia. He was one of the founders and editors of the Praxis journal, which was published from 1964 to 1974. He is credited by Milan Kangrga to be the mastermind behind the Korčula Summer School, which was a meeting place for Marxists and other philosophers from the East and the West in the 1960s and 1970s.

== Biography ==
Petrović was born on 12 March 1927 in Karlovac, Kingdom of Serbs, Croats and Slovenes. He studied philosophy at the University of Zagreb. From 1946 to 1948 he was in the Soviet Union as an exchange student, where he recognized the repression of philosophical thought under Joseph Stalin. In 1949, he wrote a critical review of an article by Boris Ziherl in the daily Borba. Ziherl was, at the time, an unquestionable figure of authority in the Communist Party's Central Committee. That same year, authorities imprisoned several students for criticising the Information Bureau. Petrović was charged as their intellectual leader, and subsequently expelled from the Party. He was reinstated to the University after many pleas were made on his behalf.

He completed his studies and earned his PhD at the University of Zagreb in 1956 with a dissertation concerning the philosophical views of Georgi Plekhanov. Upon graduating, from 1950 he taught logic and theory of philosophy at this university until his retirement. He presided over the Croat Philosophical Society from 1963 to 1964. In 1964 he was elected for president of the Yugoslav Philosophical Society.

Petrović was one of the leaders of the Yugoslav criticism of the Stalinist philosophical theses since the early 1950s. In the early 1960s, his philosophical views evolved towards an interpretation of Marxism based on the philosophical works of the young Karl Marx. This was in line with the creative line of thought of a self-management socialism which dominated the Yugoslav political landscape at the time. However, his continuous radical criticism of the dogmatic ideology of the League of Communists of Yugoslavia led to an open conflict. Petrović was one of the founders and editor-in-chief of the internationally renowned periodical Praxis that was published from 1964 to 1974. In 1968 Petrović openly supported student protests, which gained him sharp criticism from the authorities. In June of that year, he was expelled from the Party for "having sharply advocated some extreme demagogic anarcho-liberalistic views".

Petrović's Selected Works in four volumes were published in 1986. Petrović died on 13 June 1993.

== Major works ==
- Engleska empiristička filozofija. Odabrani tekstovi filozofa (The English Empiricist Philosophy) (1955)
- The Philosophical Views of G. V. Plekhanov (1957)
- Logic (1964). [Ital. transl. Logica per la III classe dei ginnasi, 1968]
- Od Lockea do Ayera. (From Locke to Ayer) (1964)
- Philosophy and Marxism (1965) (published in English under the title Marx in the Mid-Twentieth Century: A Yugoslav Philosopher Considers Karl Marx's Writings (New York: Doubleday & Company, 1967)
- The Possibility of Man (1969)
- Philosophy and Revolution (1971)
- Why Praxis (1972)
- The Thought of Revolution (1978)
- Marx and the Marxists (1986)
- U potrazi za slobodom: povijesno-filozofski ogledi (In Quest of Liberty) (1990)

== Legacy ==
In 2001, a collection of articles in his honour were published in Zagreb, entitled The Reality and the Criticism.
