= Milan Kangrga =

Croatian philosopher (1923–2008)

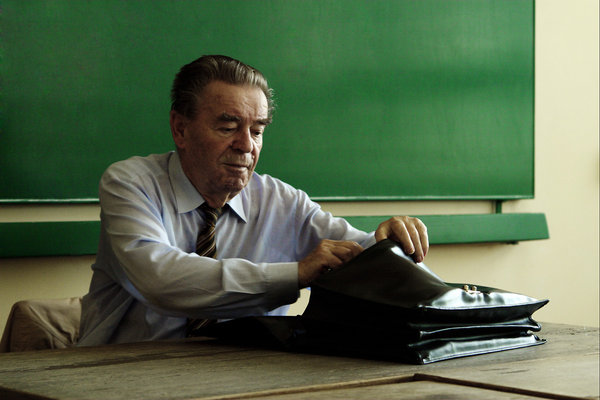
- Milan Kangrga in 2007
- Born: 1 May 1923; Zagreb, Kingdom of Serbs, Croats and Slovenes
- Died: 25 April 2008 (aged 84); Zagreb, Croatia

Philosophical work
- Era: 20th-century philosophy
- Region: Western philosophy
- School: Praxis School
- Main interests: Ethics, Marxism

Milan Kangrga (1 May 1923 – 25 April 2008) was a Croatian and Yugoslav philosopher who was one of the leading thinkers in the Praxis School of thought which originated in the 1960s in the Socialist Federal Republic of Yugoslavia.

== Biography ==
Kangrga was born in Zagreb, where he attended elementary and grammar school. In 1950, he graduated from the Faculty of Philosophy in Zagreb, where he commenced his work as a teaching assistant working in the fields of ethics and aesthetics. Between 1962 and 1964, he studied in Heidelberg, Germany. He became a tenured professor in 1972 and he held this position until his retirement in 1993.

Kangrga started his confrontation with the Yugoslav communist leadership during his undergraduate studies in February 1948, before the clash of Joseph Broz Tito with Joseph Stalin. Then, he published his first philosophical article entitled On Ethics in Studentski list (Zagreb), which the League of Communists of Yugoslavia bureaucrats found provoking. In 1953, Kangrga became a member of the LCY but in 1954 he was expelled from the party because he announced that he was inspired to become a communist by the works of Miroslav Krleža, who still wasn't wholly rehabilitated by the regime.

In 1964, Kangrga was one of the founders of the journal Praxis. Together with Rudi Supek, he has established the Korčula Summer School, which was a unique meeting place for philosophers from the East and the West between 1964 and 1974. It is around these two institutions that the Praxis school took shape. The defining features of the school were: 1) emphasis on the writings of young Marx; and 2) call for freedom of speech in both East and West based upon Marx's insistence on ruthless critique of everything existent. Milan Kangrga emphasized creativity as well, but also the understanding of human beings as producers humanizing nature.

While he was critical of the Communist party in Yugoslavia, mainly for not implementing self-management socialism, he rejected non-Socialist reactions against SFR Yugoslavia, the most notable one being the Croatian Spring.

Milan Kangrga has lectured in Bonn, Munich, Prague, Budapest, Moscow, and Kyiv among other cities. His articles have been published in Germany, Italy, the United States, France, Spain, Hungary, Czechoslovakia, Austria and Mexico.

== Major works ==
Kangrga has published 15 books. The most important are:

- The Ethical Problem in Karl Marx's Works (1963)
- Ethics and Liberty (1966)
- The Meaning of the Historical (1970)
- The Man and the World (1975)
- Ethics or Revolution (1983)
- Praxis-Time-World (1984)
- Hegel-Marx: some basic problems of Marxism (1988)
- The Meaning and the Reality (1989)
- Smugglers of Own Life (2001)
- Nationalism or Democracy (2002)
- Ethics: the basic problems and tendencies (2004)
- Classical German Idealism (2008)
