= Mislav Ježić =

Croatian philologist

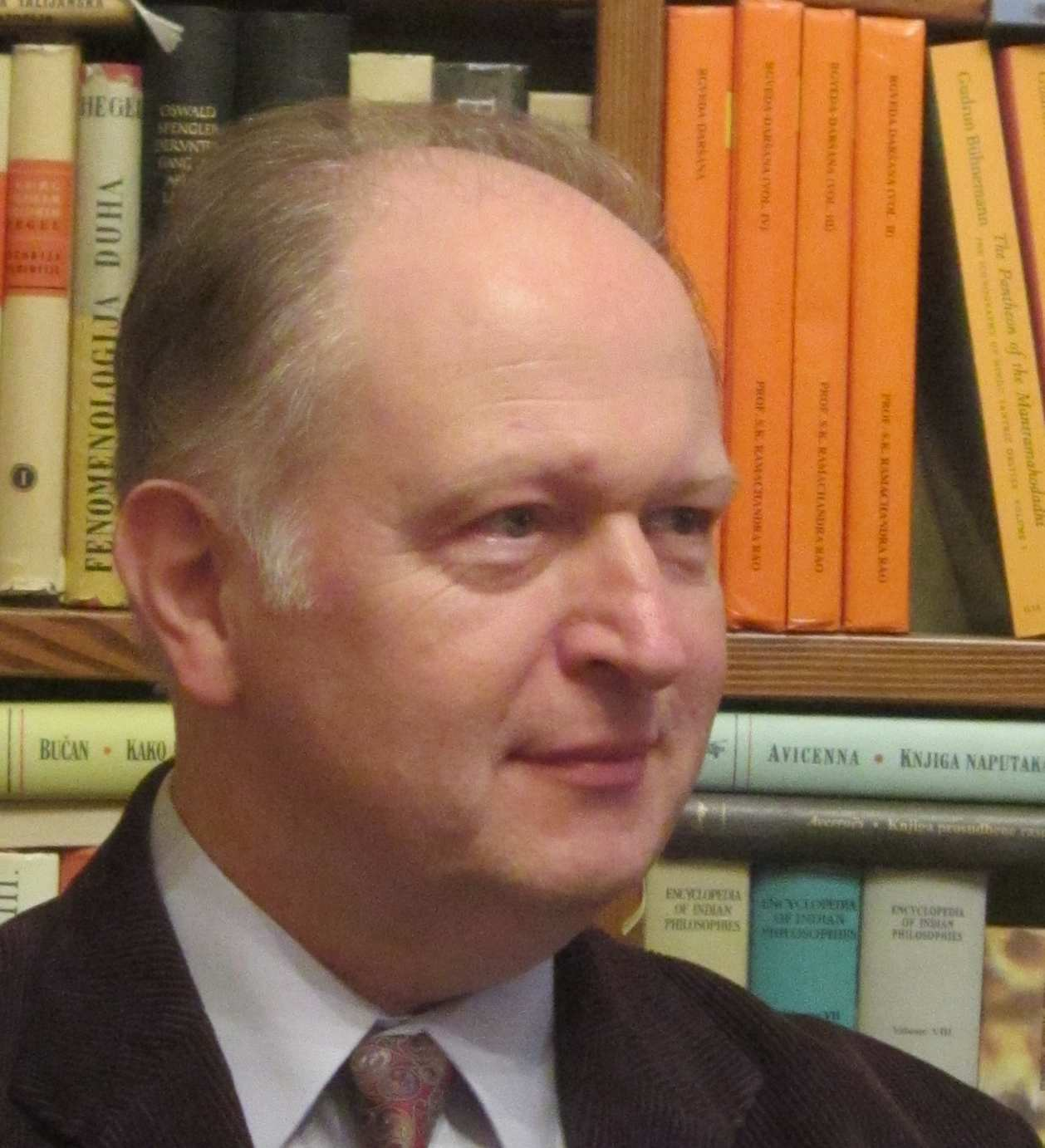
Mislav Ježić

Mislav Ježić (born 20 September 1952) is a Croatian philosopher and Indologist.

He received a degree in Indology, philosophy, linguistics and Ancient Greek at the University of Zagreb. He received his Ph.D. in 1983 with a thesis on Rigvedic hymns. From 1998 until his retirement in 2017 he worked as a professor of Indian philology at the University of Zagreb. His work deals with the Indo-European sources of Vedic tradition, research on the beginnings of Indian philosophy by comparing it with Ancient Greek philosophy, and explorations of the ancient Indian epics, Brahmanism and Hinduism.

He organized several international conferences in the field of Indology, edited and published several proceedings. He is a full member of the Croatian Academy of Sciences and Arts since 2000.

== Works ==
- Ṛgvedski himni (1987)
- Mišljenje i riječ o bitku u svijetu (1989)
- Ṛgvedske upanišadi (1999)
