= Branko Bošnjak =

Croatian philosopher

Branko Bošnjak (14 January 1923 – 18 June 1996) was a Croatian philosopher, member of the Praxis school in the former Yugoslavia. Bošnjak was a professor at the Faculty of Philosophy at the University of Zagreb and for a period a head of the Department for History of Philosophy and a dean of the faculty. He was a member of the Croatian Academy of Sciences and Arts. He died in Zagreb and was buried in Mirogoj Cemetery.

== Major works ==
Bošnjak's main fields of interest were religion and history of philosophy. His major works are:

- History of Philosophy as a Science (1958)
- Logos and Dialectics (1961)
- Philosophy and Christianity (1966)
- The Greek Philosophical Criticism on the Bible (1971)
- The Meaning of the Philosophical Existence (1981)
- Philosophy and History (1983)
- History of Philosophy (1993)
