= Simo Elaković =

Simo Elaković (Serbian Cyrillic: Симо Елаковић; born 1940 in Trebinje, SFRY – 10 July 2016) was a Serbian philosopher and Professor at University of Belgrade Faculty of Philosophy.

== Biography ==
After earning his degree in philosophy from the University of Belgrade, he has continued further specialization in Germany. He has worked as professor at a gymnasium in Dubrovnik and in Sremski Karlovci. He has been elected as assistant at the University of Zagreb Faculty of Economics. He worked as a Professor of Sociology at the University of Zagreb Faculty of Philosophy, then he moved to Belgrade, where he reaches a Professor of Philosophy title.

He was acting for head Department of Philosophy and simultaneously was a longtime Head of the History Department in the Philosophy Faculty, Belgrade. He also was a president of Serbian Philosophy Society.

He is the author of books including: Filozofija kao kritika društva (Philosophy as a Critic of Society), Sociologija slobodnog vremena i turizma – Fragmenti kritike svakodnevlja (Sociology of Free Time and Tourism – Fragments of Daily Critics), Pravci i smisao kretanja savremene filozofije (Directions & Sense of Contemporary Philosophy Motion), Sociokulturne promjene pod uticajem turizma na Jadranskom području (Social–Cultural Shifts Influenced by Tourism in the Adriatic Area), Rasprave o Evropi i filozofiji na kraju XX veka (Debates about Europe & Philosophy in the end of 20th century), Poslovna etika i komuniciranje (Business Ethics and Communication) and studies and debates in the field of classical German idealism, as well as contemporary philosophy and sociology.
