= Željko Loparić =

Philosopher

- Born: Željko Loparić; 3 December 1939 (age 86); Cvetković, Banovina of Croatia, Kingdom of Yugoslavia
- Occupations: Philosopher, university professor

Željko Loparić (born 3 December 1939) is a Yugoslav-born Brazilian philosopher, historian of philosophy and university teacher. Born in modern-day Croatia, he is a naturalized Brazilian, and professor at the University of Campinas.

== Bibliography ==
- Heidegger, Rio de Janeiro (2004)
- Sobre a responsabilidade, Porto Alegre (2003)
- A semântica transcendental de Kant, Campinas (2000)
- Descartes Heurístico, Campinas (1997)
- Ética e finitude, São Paulo (2004)
- Optuženik Heidegger, Zagreb (1991)
- Heidegger réu. Um ensaio sobre a periculosidade da filosofia, Campinas (1990)
