= Anđelko Habazin =

Croatian philosopher

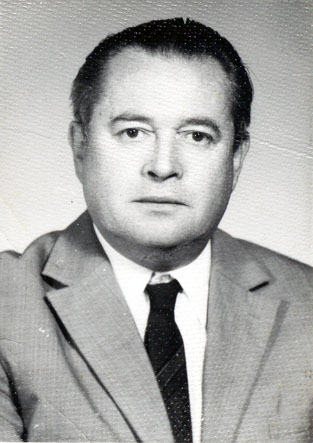
Anđelko Habazin

Anđelko Habazin (7 November 1924 – 6 October 1978) was a Croatian philosopher.

Anđelko Habazin was born in Zagreb (Croatia), where he graduated from the university with a degree in philosophy in 1954. He received his doctorate degree in philosophy from the University of Sarajevo (Bosnia and Herzegovina) in 1962. He worked as a professor at the University of Banja Luka (Bosnia and Herzegovina), and then at the University of Zadar (Croatia) from 1974 until 1978. He died in Zadar, aged 54.
