= Faculty of Philosophy, University of Belgrade =

University faculty in Belgrade, Serbia

University of Belgrade Faculty of Philosophy
- Филозофски факултет Универзитета у Београду
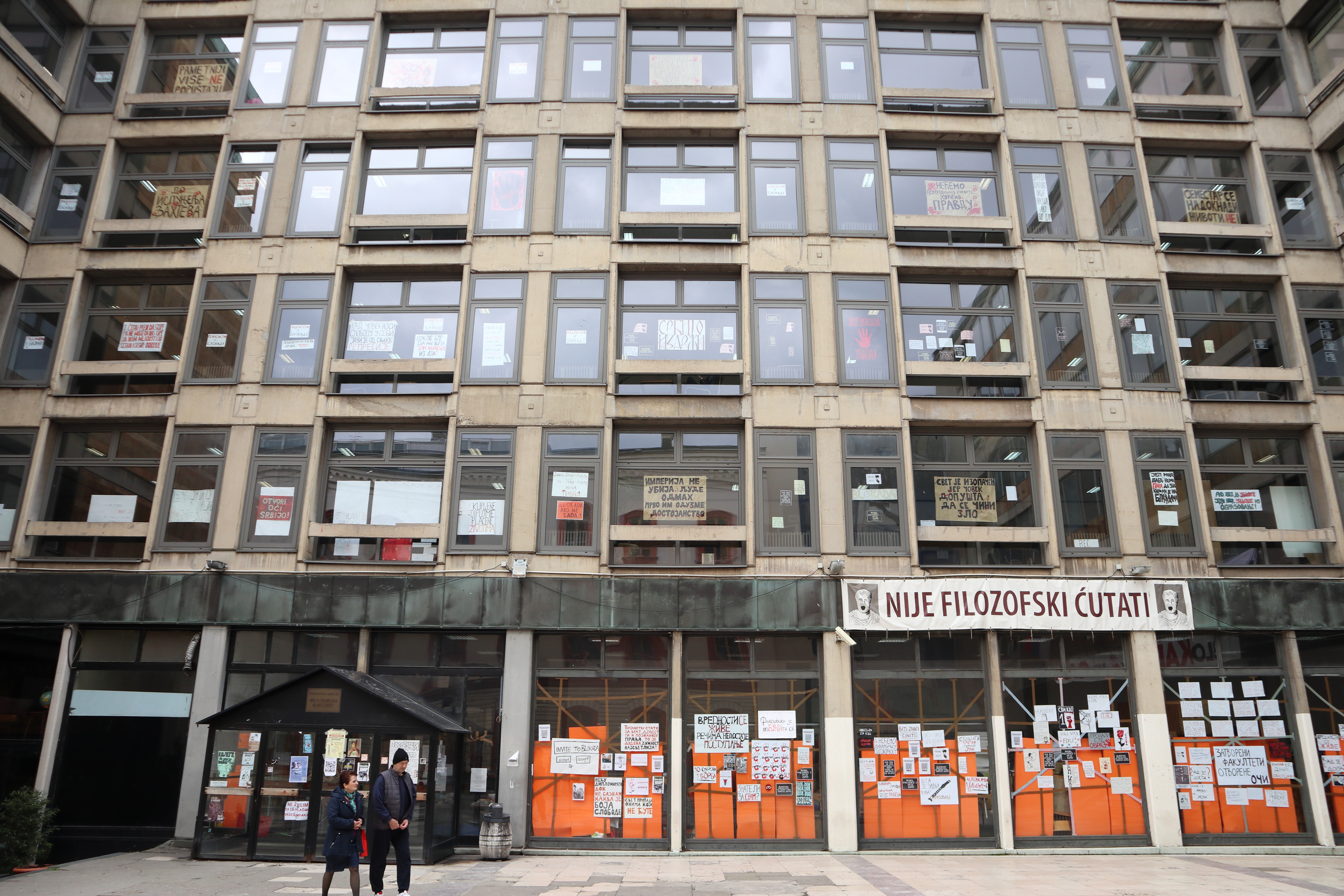
- Type: Public
- Established: 1838
- Dean: Danijel Sinani
- Academic staff: 277 (2025–26)
- Administrative staff: 174 (2025–26)
- Students: 4,154 (2025–26)
- Undergraduates: 3,020 (2025–26)
- Postgraduates: 620 (2025–26)
- Doctoral students: 514 (2025–26)
- Location: Belgrade, Serbia; 44.817952°N 20.457909°E
- Campus: Urban
- Website: www.f.bg.ac.rs

The University of Belgrade Faculty of Philosophy (Serbian: Филозофски факултет Универзитета у Београду, romanized: Filozofski fakultet Univerziteta u Beogradu), established in 1838 within the Belgrade Higher School, is the oldest Faculty at the University of Belgrade. The Faculty building is located at the meeting point of the Čika-Ljubina with the Knez Mihailova Street, the main pedestrian and shopping zone in Belgrade, Stari Grad.

The Faculty employs 277 teaching staff and enrolls approximately 4000 undergraduate and graduate students within ten departments: Department of Philosophy, Department of Classics, Department of History, Department of Art History, Department of Archaeology, Department of Ethnology and Anthropology, Department of Sociology, Department of Psychology, Department of Andragogy and Department of Pedagogy.

== Notable alumni ==
- Mira Adanja-Polak, Freelance producer, journalist and presenter
- Lidiia Alekseeva, Latvian poet and writer of short stories
- Mehdi Bardhi, Founder of the Institute of Albanology in Priština
- Alojz Benac, President of the Academy of Sciences and Arts of Bosnia and Herzegovina (1977-1981)
- Gani Bobi, Albanian philosopher and sociologist
- Milan Budimir, Serbian classical scholar
- Miloš N. Đurić, Serbian classical scholar
- Miodrag Bulatović, Montenegrin Serb novelist and playwright
- Branko Ćopić, Bosnian and Yugoslav writer
- Bora Ćosić, Serbian and Croatian writer
- Zija Dizdarević, Bosnian prose writer
- Zoran Đinđić, Prime Minister of Serbia (2001–2003)
- Rajko Đurić, Serbian Romani writer
- Jelena Genčić, Serbian tennis coach
- Trivo Inđić, Advisor to the Serbian President (2004–2012)
- Žarko Korać, Deputy Prime Minister in the Government of Serbia (2001-2004)
- Desanka Kovačević-Kojić, Serbian historian
- Sonja Licht, President of the Belgrade Fund for Political Excellence (2003–present)
- Sima Lozanić, first Rector of the University of Belgrade
- Desanka Maksimović, Serbian poet
- Miroslav Marcovich, philologist and university professor
- Simo Elaković, Serbian philosopher and economist
- Mihailo Marković, Serbian philosopher
- Dragoljub Mićunović, Serbian politician and philosopher
- Nikola Milošević, Serbian writer and political philosopher
- Dragoslav Mitrinović, Serbian mathematician
- Vasko Popa, Serbian poet of Romanian descent
- Branka Prpa (born 1953), historian.
- Nebojša Radmanović, President of Bosnia and Herzegovina (2008–2009)
- Šerbo Rastoder, Montenegrin Bosniak philosopher and historian
- Vladislav F. Ribnikar, founder of Politika, the oldest Serbian newspaper
- Veljko Rus, Slovenian philosopher and politician
- Ljubodrag Simonović, Serbian philosopher, author and retired basketball player
- Bogoljub Šijaković, Serbian Minister of Religion (2008–2012)
- Boris Tadić, President of Serbia (2004–2012)
- Ljubomir Tadić, one of the founders of the Democratic Party in Serbia
- Ljubodrag Dimić, Serbian historian and university professor
- Lepa Mladjenovic, Serbian feminist and lesbian activist
- Zdravko Dizdar, Croatian historian
- Miloje Grbin, Serbian sociologist and poet
