= Declaration on the Common Language =

2017 statement on Croatian, Serbian, Bosnian and Montenegrin

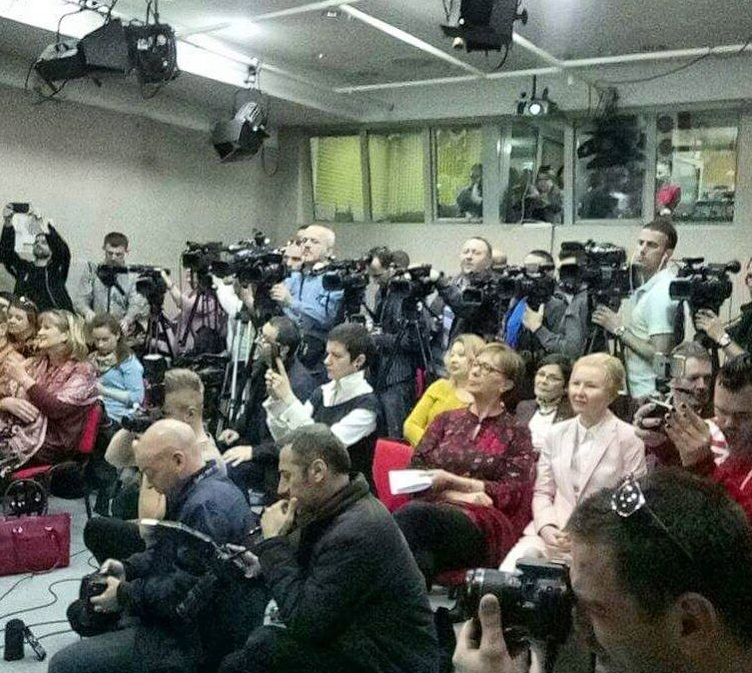
Press conference about the Declaration on the Common Language

The "Declaration on the Common Language" (Serbo-Croatian: Deklaracija o zajedničkom jeziku / Декларација о заједничком језику) was issued in 2017 by a group of intellectuals and NGOs from Bosnia and Herzegovina, Croatia, Montenegro and Serbia who were working under the banner of a project called "Language and Nationalism". The Declaration states that Bosniaks, Croats, Montenegrins and Serbs have a common standard language of the polycentric type.

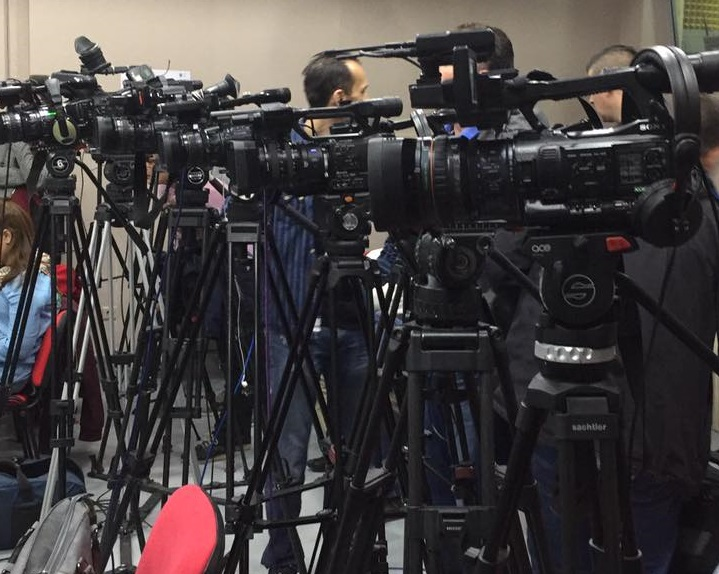
Great interest of television companies in the Press conference about the Declaration

Before any public presentation, the Declaration was signed by over 200 prominent writers, scientists, journalists, activists and other public figures from the four countries. After being published, it has been signed by over 10,000 people from all over the region. The Declaration on the Common Language is an attempt to counter nationalistic factions. Its aim is to stimulate discussion on language without nationalism and to contribute to the reconciliation process.

== Background ==
The Declaration followed the international project Languages and Nationalisms (founded by two German foundations: Forum Ziviler Friedensdienst and Allianz Kulturstiftung), within which conferences were held in the four countries during 2016, thus providing an insight into the current situation and problems. The project was inspired by the book Language and Nationalism, and was organized by four non-governmental organizations from each of the countries included: P.E.N. Center Bosnia-Herzegovina from Sarajevo, the Association Kurs from Split, Krokodil from Belgrade and the Civic Education Center from Podgorica. An interdisciplinary series of expert conferences in Podgorica, Split, Belgrade and Sarajevo took place under participation of linguists, journalists, anthropologists and others. Numerous audiences were also included. The titles of debates on the conferences were:

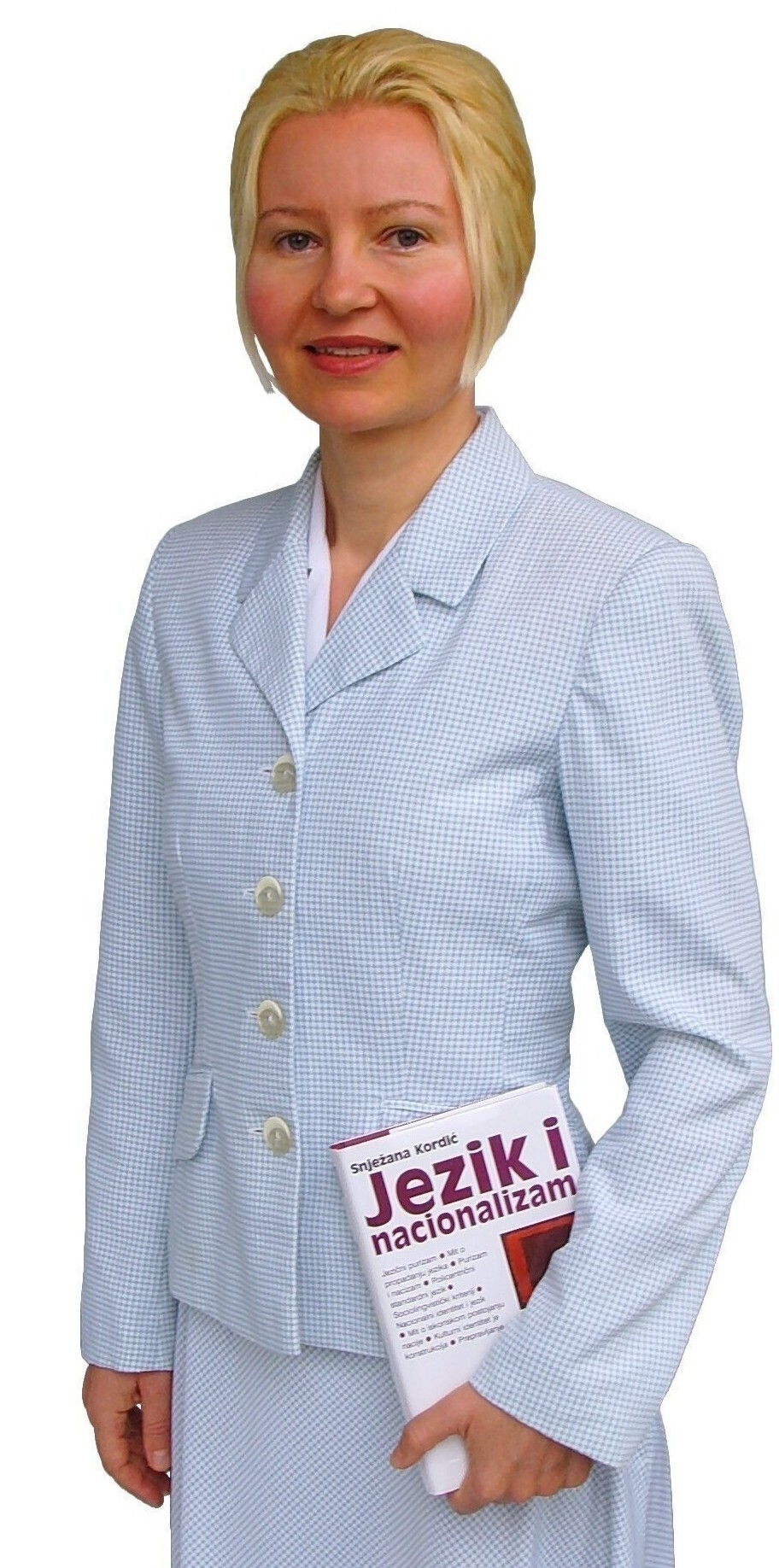
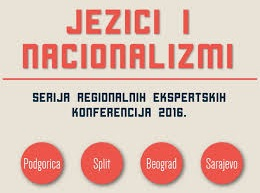
The book Language and Nationalism (left) inspired the project Languages and Nationalisms (right).

Series of international expert conferences Languages and Nationalisms in 2016
| Place | Titles of debates | Date |
|---|---|---|
| Podgorica | Does every people in Montenegro speak a different language? | 21 April |
| Podgorica | What is the purpose of increasing language differences? | 22 April |
| Split | Does anarchy threaten if we do not prescribe how to speak? | 19 May |
| Split | What if Croats and Serbs have a common language? | 20 May |
| Belgrade | Who is it that steals the language? | 5 October |
| Belgrade | The ideology of the correct language | 6 October |
| Sarajevo | Political manipulations of the topic of language | 23 November |
| Sarajevo | Proofreaders as nationality-imposers | 24 November |

== Creation ==
More than thirty experts participated in the drafting of the Declaration, half of whom were linguists of different nationalities from the four states. The process of writing lasted for several months. The initiative emerged just after the last conference in Sarajevo, when young people from Bosnia-Herzegovina who experienced the educational segregation in the so-called "two schools under one roof" came up with the idea of composing a text that would encourage change of the language policy in all four countries. They entitled the text Declaration on the Common Language and gave it for rewriting to professional linguists, so that the Declaration was redrafted in Zagreb in the following months and can therefore be called the "Zagreb Declaration."

As a continuation of the project Languages and Nationalisms, a committee of experts of different nationalities from all four countries was formed that worked on the final version of the Declaration on 16 and 17 January 2017 in Zagreb. After the meeting, the text was sent to some twenty consultants, whose proposals are then embedded in the final form of the text.

== Content ==
The Declaration states that Bosniaks, Croats, Montenegrins and Serbs have a common standard language of the polycentric type. It refers to the fact that the four peoples communicate effectively without an interpreter due to their mutual intelligibility, which is a key notion when talking about languages. Furthermore, it points out that the current language policy of emphasizing differences has led to a number of negative phenomena, and linguistic expression is imposed as a criterion of ethnonational affiliation and a means of affirming political loyalty. The Declaration states that language and people do not have to coincide, and that each state or nation may independently codify its own variant of the common language, and that the four standard variants enjoy equal status. The Declaration calls for abolishing all forms of linguistic segregation and discrimination in educational and public institutions. It also advocates for the freedom of individual choice and respect for linguistic diversity.

== Presentation ==
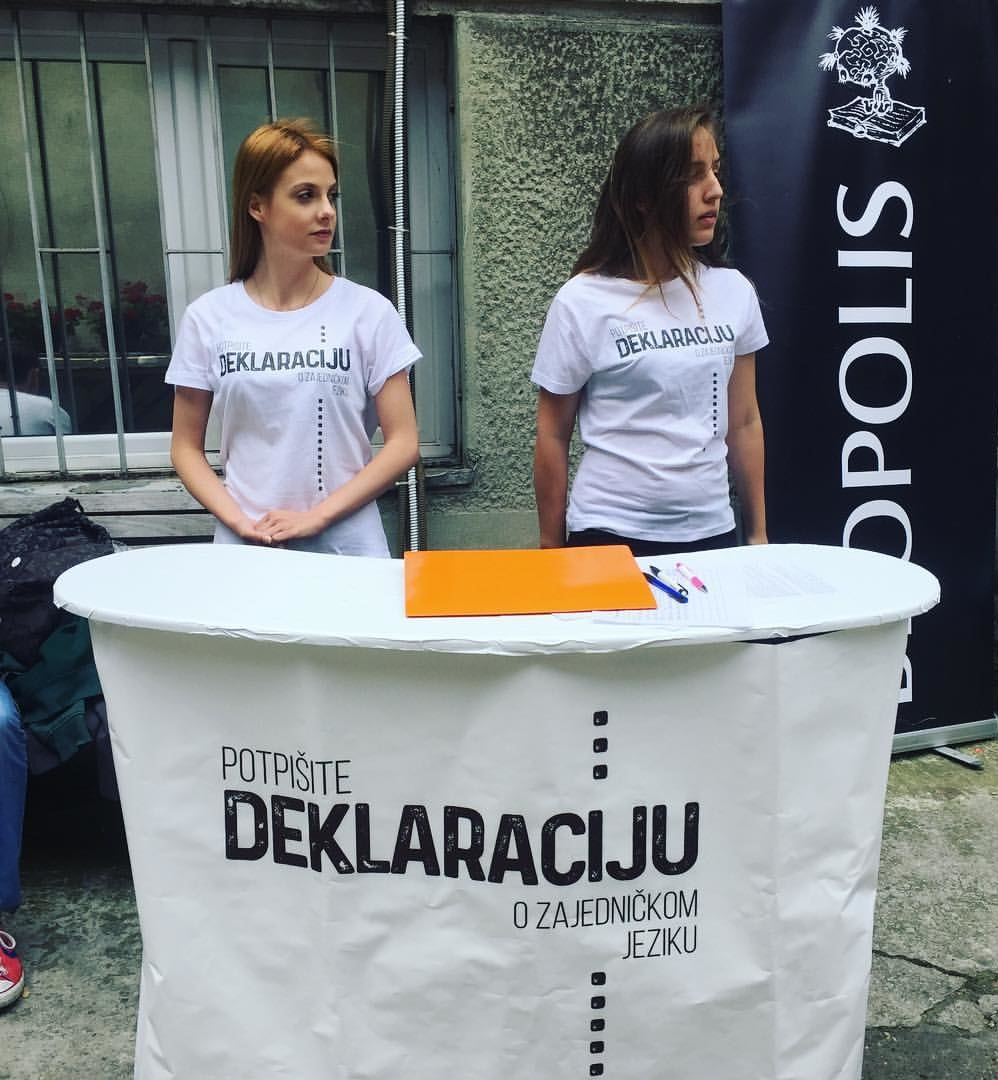
Collecting signatures for the Declaration

The Declaration on the Common Language, with more than two hundred signatures of prominent intellectuals from Croatia, Montenegro, Bosnia-Herzegovina, Serbia, and other countries, was presented to the public on 30 March 2017 at simultaneous events held in Zagreb, Podgorica, Belgrade and Sarajevo, where a press conference was held and two panel discussions with titles "What is a common language?" and "Language and the Future". Then the Declaration was opened for signing to other people. Over the next few days, more than 8,000 people signed it. Two months later, in the framework of the 10th Subversive Festival in Zagreb, a round table on the Declaration, titled "Language and Nationalism", was held. Then a debate "About the Declaration on the Common Language and Other Demons" was held at the Crocodile Literature Festival in Belgrade. After that, in Novi Sad, a panel discussion "Whose is Our Language?" at the Exit festival and a forum "What are the Achievements of the Declaration on the Common Language?" at the International literary conference, Book Talk, were organised. In Montenegro, there was a round table on the Declaration in the framework of the 7th Njegoš's Days. At the end of 2017, a discussion "What to do With the Language: Who speaks (or does not speak) the common language?" was organised at the 6th Open University in Sarajevo.

Series of panel discussions on the Declaration in 2017
| Place | Discussion title | Event | Date |
|---|---|---|---|
| Sarajevo | What is a Common Language?^{[a]} | Presentation of the Declaration | 30 March |
| Sarajevo | Language and the Future^{[b]} | Presentation of the Declaration | 30 March |
| Sarajevo | Who Speaks (or does not Speak) the Common Language?^{[c]} | Open University | 10 November |
| Zagreb | Language and Nationalism^{[d]} | Subversive Festival | 19 May |
| Belgrade | About the Declaration on the Common Language and Other Demons^{[e]} | Krokodil Literary Festival | 18 June |
| Novi Sad | Whose is Our Language?^{[f]} | Exit Festival | 8 July |
| Novi Sad | What are the Achievements of the Declaration on the Common Language?^{[g]} | Book Talk | 29 September |
| Kotor | Declaration on the Common Language^{[h]} | Njegoš's Days | 1 September |

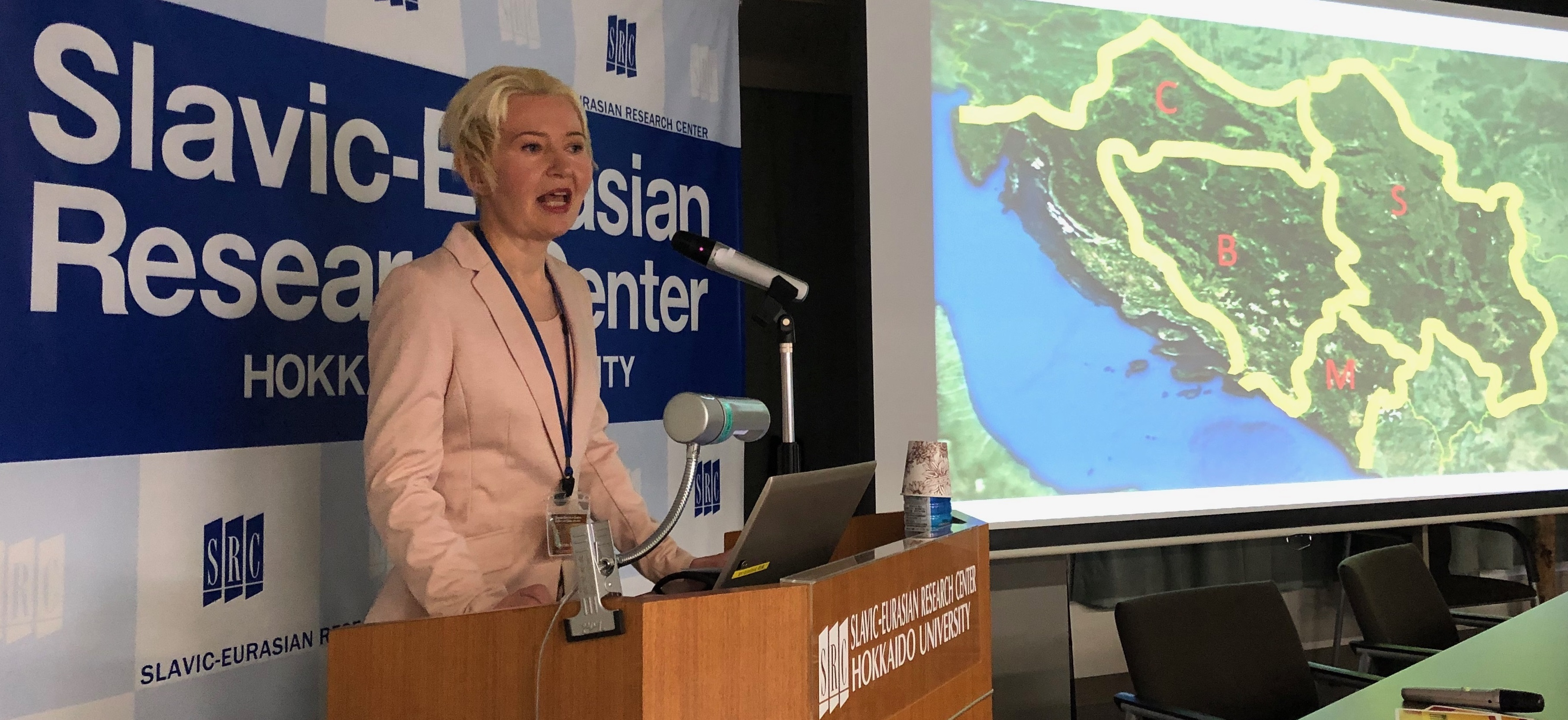
Snježana Kordić's plenary lecture on the Declaration at a conference in Japan 2018

During 2018, a series of plenary lectures on the Declaration was held at conferences at the universities of various EU countries, and then at the universities in Japan. On the occasion of the second anniversary of the Declaration, two round tables were held: in Vienna "Language and Nationalisms: Do We Understand Each Other?" and in Zagreb "One Language or Several Languages: Discussion on the Declaration on the Common Language", organized by the Union of Student Associations of the Faculty of Philosophy in Zagreb, which later also organized a plenary lecture on the Declaration at the Faculty of Philosophy in Zagreb.

== Signatories ==
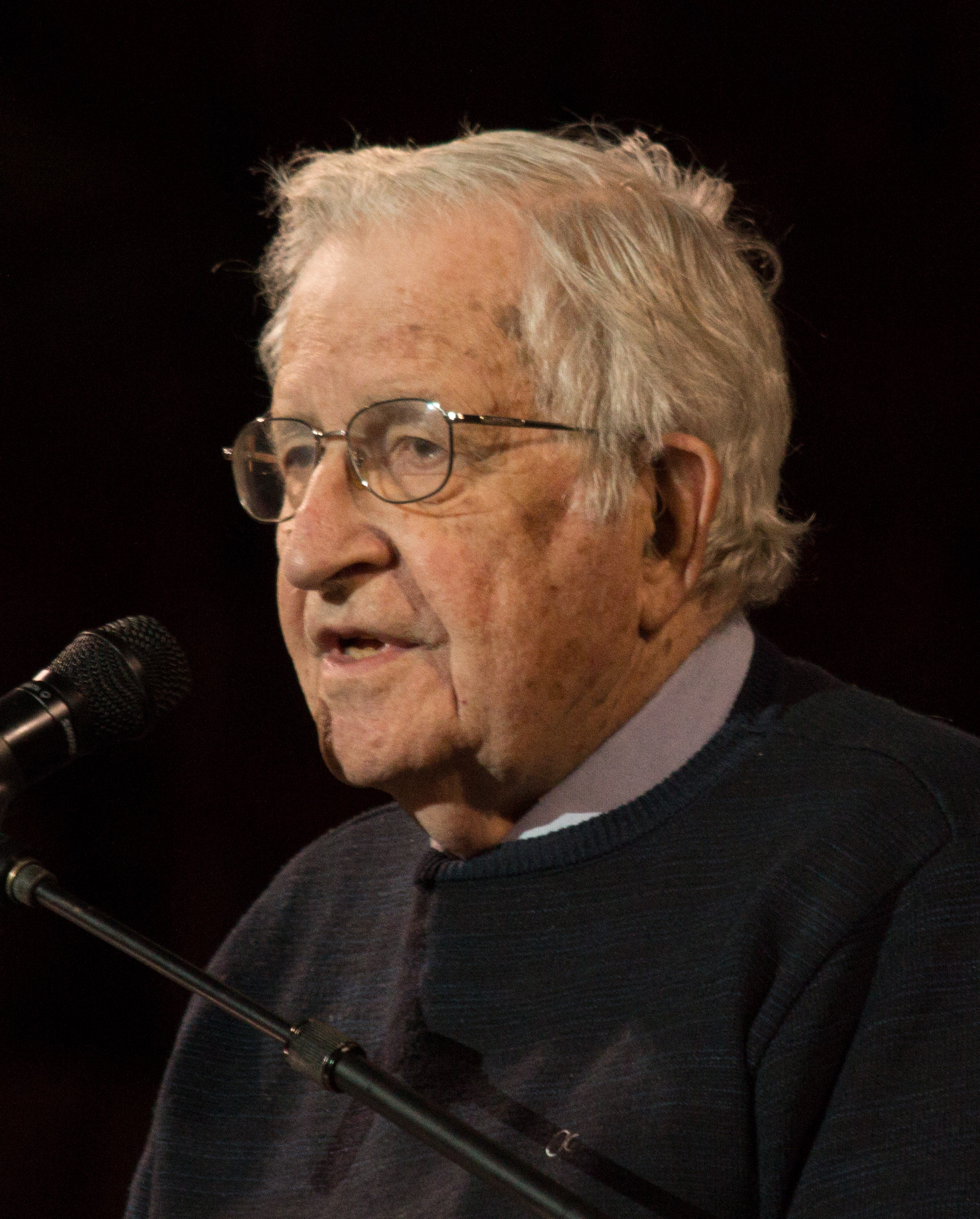
Noam Chomsky, one of the signatories of the Declaration

The British sociolinguist Peter Trudgill notes that "linguists are well represented on the list of signatories." One of the most famous linguists at the time, Noam Chomsky, signed the Declaration on the Common Language, which was deemed particularly resounding. The Declaration has been signed by "over fifty other linguists".

Signatories of the Declaration include:

- Greville Corbett
- Ivana Bodrožić
- Mirjana Karanović
- Sandra Benčić
- Rajko Grlić
- Željko Komšić
- Svetislav Basara
- Jurica Pavičić
- Vedrana Rudan
- Olja Savičević Ivančević
- Dejan Jović
- Igor Štiks
- Nadežda Čačinovič
- Ivan Ivanji
- Lenka Udovički
- Filip David
- Ognjen Sviličić
- Vladimir Arsenijević
- Srećko Horvat
- Rada Iveković
- Dino Mustafić
- Štefica Galić
- Pjer Žalica
- Snježana Kordić
- Dubravka Ugrešić
- Ante Tomić
- Noam Chomsky
- Boris Dežulović
- Dragan Markovina
- Enver Kazaz
- Viktor Ivančić
- Oto Horvat
- Maja Herman Sekulić
- Tomislav Jakić
- Željko Ivanković
- Svetlana Lukić
- Dejan Tiago Stanković
- Nihad Hasanović
- Srđan Srdić
- Reuf Bajrović
- Maja Vidaković Lalić
- Vesna Teršelič
- Ivan Klajn
- Boris Bakal
- Borka Pavićević
- Jasna Šamić
- Slobodan Šnajder
- Tanja Miletić Oručević
- Senahid Halilović
- Saša Ilić
- Daša Drndić
- Edvin Kanka Ćudić
- Rade Šerbedžija
- Biljana Srbljanović
- Raymond Detrez
- Dubravka Stojanović
- Srđan Tešin
- Isidora Žebeljan
- Dino Abazović
- Aleksandar Zograf
- Boban Stojanović
- Mima Simić
- Siniša Malešević
- Šerbo Rastoder
- Ivana Sajko
- Rastko Močnik
- Tanja Stupar-Trifunović
- Drago Pilsel
- Bojana Vunturišević
- Peter Trudgill
- Vladimir Veličković
- Srbijanka Turajlić
- Ermin Bravo
- Marko Tomaš
- Nenad Veličković
- Ranko Bugarski
- Dritan Abazović
- Izudin Bajrović
- Jasmila Žbanić
- Danko Šipka
- Balša Brković
- Stefan Bošković
- Asim Mujkić
- Florian Bieber
- Jasna Diklić
- Vesna Pešić
- Goran Marković
- Vladislav Bajac
- Stevan Filipović
- Igor Kusin
- Feđa Stojanović
- Adela Jušić
- Koča Pavlović
- Milena Dragićević Šešić
- Natalia Długosz
- Milena Dragićević Šešić
- Bora Ćosić
- Tatjana Bezjak
- Dragoljub Mićunović
- Stanislava Staša Zajović
- Goran Dević
- Miloš Okuka
- Lana Bastašić
- Srđa Pavlović
- Igor Galo
- Faruk Šehić
- Zvonimir Jurić
- Nicholas Evans
- Srđan Karanović
- Zdravko Grebo
- Lana Barić
- Dejan Đokić
- Aleksandar Novaković
- Maša Kolanović

== Published reactions ==
- Arsenijević, Boban (15 April 2017). "Policentrični zajednički jezik i deklaracija o tome izazvali burne reakcije (intervju vodili Nemanja Stevanović i Vladimir Đorđević)" [The Polycentric Common Language and the Declaration produced stormy reactions (interview conducted by Nemanja Stevanović and Vladimir Đorđević)] (in Serbo-Croatian). Niš: Media & Reform centar. Archived from the original on 12 May 2017.
- Arsenijević, Boban (18 May 2017). "Deklaracija je uzdrmala temelj nacionalističke zloupotrebe jezika (intervju vodio Vladislav Stojičić)" [The Declaration Has Shaken the Foundation of Nationalist Abuse of Language (interview conducted by Vladislav Stojičić)] (in Serbo-Croatian). Zagreb: P-portal. Archived from the original on 7 January 2019.
- Arsenijević, Vladimir; Klajn, Ivan (8 April 2017). "Govore li Srbi, Hrvati, Bošnjaci i Crnogorci isti jezik? (pripremila Kristina Šarić)" [Do Serbs, Croats, Bosniaks and Montenegrins Speak the Same Language? (by Kristina Šarić)]. TV news Vojvođanski dnevnik (in Serbo-Croatian). Novi Sad: Radio Television of Vojvodina. Archived from the original on 12 April 2017.
- Bahr, Manuel (31 March 2017). "Deklaration: B/K/M/S ist eine Sprache – "Ich habe unterschrieben!"" [Declaration: B/C/S/M is One Language – "I Have Signed!"] (in German). Vienna: Kosmo. Archived from the original on 7 August 2018.
- Bogavac, Milena (8 July 2017). "Kako sam potpisala da nisam poliglota" [How I Signed that I Was not a Polyglot] (in Serbo-Croatian). Belgrade: Noizz. Archived from the original on 10 July 2017.
- Bugarski, Ranko (5 April 2017). "Dobronameran apel javnosti (intervju vodila Sonja Ćirić)" [Well-Intentioned Appeal to the Public (interview conducted by Sonja Ćirić)]. Vreme: Nedeljnik (in Serbo-Croatian). Belgrade: Vreme. ISSN 0353-8028. Archived from the original on 26 August 2017.
- Bugarski, Ranko (13 April 2017). "Deklaracija nije politička platforma (intervju vodila Mirjana Mitrović)" [Declaration is not a Political Platform (interview conducted by Mirjana Mitrović)] (in Serbo-Croatian). Belgrade: Ekspres. Archived from the original on 12 June 2017.
- Bugarski, Ranko (7 May 2017). "Mali katalog promašaja" [A Small Catalog of Flaws]. Danas (in Serbo-Croatian). Belgrade. ISSN 1450-538X. Archived from the original on 14 May 2017.
- Cingel, Ivan (14 April 2017). "Drevni i volšebni jeziče Hrvata" [Ancient and Magic Language of Croats] (in Serbo-Croatian). Zagreb: Forum.tm. ISSN 1849-3874. Archived from the original on 21 May 2017.
- Cingel, Ivan (27 April 2017). "Ovo nije još jedan tekst o Deklaraciji" [This is not Another Text About the Declaration] (in Serbo-Croatian). Zagreb: Forum.tm. ISSN 1849-3874. Archived from the original on 19 May 2017.
- Dežulović, Boris (1 April 2017). "Riba ribi grize jezik" [Fish Bites Fish's Tongue]. Nedeljski Dnevnik (in Slovenian). Ljubljana: Dnevnik. ISSN 1581-3037. Archived from the original on 10 July 2019.
- Dežulović, Boris (9 April 2017). "Hapsus linguae" [Hapsus Linguae] (in Serbo-Croatian). Zagreb: Novosti. ISSN 1845-8955. Archived from the original on 6 June 2017.
- Glušica, Rajka (20 April 2017). "Čitaj pažljivo (intervju vodila Sonja Ćirić)" [Read Carefully (interviewed by Sonja Ćirić)]. Vreme: Nedeljnik (in Serbo-Croatian). Belgrade: Vreme. ISSN 0353-8028. Archived from the original on 8 October 2017.
- Gudžević, Sinan (18 April 2017). "Reklaracija" [Reklaration] (in Serbo-Croatian). Zagreb: Novosti. ISSN 1845-8955. Archived from the original on 22 May 2017.
- Gudžević, Sinan (2 May 2017). "Pismo kardinalu Bozaniću" [Letter to Cardinal Bozanić] (in Serbo-Croatian). Zagreb: Novosti. ISSN 1845-8955. Archived from the original on 12 May 2017.
- Halilović, Senahid (26 April 2018). "Halilović za N1: Dužni smo osluškivati javnu riječ" [Halilović for N1: We Have to Listen to the Public Word]. TV show N1 na jedan (host Nikola Vučić) (in Serbo-Croatian). Sarajevo: N1. min 19:34
- Ivančić, Viktor (8 April 2017). "Novi Novi list" [New Novi list] (in Serbo-Croatian). Zagreb: Novosti. ISSN 1845-8955. Archived from the original on 8 June 2017.
- Ivančić, Viktor (17 April 2017). "Kako ne biti Jugoslaven?" [How not to be a Yugoslav?] (in Serbo-Croatian). Podgorica: Proletter. Archived from the original on 21 May 2017.
- Kazaz, Enver (27 April 2017). "Jezik nije mentalni kazamat (intervju vodila Sonja Ćirić)" [Language is not a Mental Prison (interview conducted by Sonja Ćirić)]. Vreme: Nedeljnik (in Serbo-Croatian). Belgrade: Vreme. ISSN 0353-8028. Archived from the original on 7 January 2019.
- Kljajić, Jagoda (3 April 2017). "Potpišite Deklaraciju o zajedničkom jeziku" [Sign the Declaration on the Common Language] (in Serbo-Croatian). Belgrade: Prozaonline. Archived from the original on 6 May 2017.
- Kordić, Snježana (4 April 2017). "Neki Srbi misle da Deklaracija favorizira Hrvate (intervju vodio Denis Derk)" [Some Serbs Think the Declaration Favors Croats (interviewed by Denis Derk)]. Večernji list (in Serbo-Croatian). Zagreb. pp. 36–37. ISSN 0350-5006. CROSBI 935899. Archived from the original on 21 September 2017.
- Kordić, Snježana (5 April 2017). "Čitaj pažljivo, kako god zoveš jezik" [Read Carefully, Whatever You Call the Language] (in Serbo-Croatian). Bonn: Deutsche Welle. CROSBI 936014. Archived from the original on 2 July 2017.
- Kordić, Snježana (13 April 2017). "Jezik više naroda (intervju vodila Sonja Ćirić)" [The Language of Several Peoples (interview conducted by Sonja Ćirić)]. Vreme: Nedeljnik (in Serbo-Croatian). Belgrade: Vreme. ISSN 0353-8028. CROSBI 936009. Archived from the original on 26 August 2017.
- Kordić, Snježana; Ibrahimović, Nedžad (3 May 2017). "O Deklaraciji o zajedničkom jeziku" [About the Declaration on the Common Language]. TV show Globalno (host Boris Malagurski (in Serbo-Croatian). BN Televizija. Archived from the original on 22 October 2017. Alt URL min 84:14
- Kordić, Snježana (10 January 2018). "Reagiranje na tekst Borisa Budena povodom Deklaracije o zajedničkom jeziku" [Reaction to the Boris Buden's Text Regarding the Declaration on the Common Language] (in Serbo-Croatian). Zagreb: Slobodni Filozofski. CROSBI 935894. Archived from the original on 16 April 2018.
- Kordić, Snježana (30 March 2018). "Čistoća naroda i jezika ne postoji (intervju vodila Gordana Sandić-Hadžihasanović)" [There is no Purity of Nation and Language (interviewed by Gordana Sandić-Hadžihasanović)]. Radio Slobodna Evropa (in Serbo-Croatian). Prague: Radio Free Europe/Radio Liberty. CROSBI 935824. Archived from the original on 30 March 2018.
- Kordić, Snježana (26 February 2018). "Deklaracija ruši i posljednji tabu (intervju vodila Maja Abadžija)" [The Declaration Breaks Down the Last Taboo (interviewed by Maja Abadžija)] (in Serbo-Croatian). Sarajevo: Oslobođenje. pp. 18–19. ISSN 0351-3904. CROSBI 935790. Archived from the original on 7 August 2018. Alt URL
- Kordić, Snježana (24 August 2018). "Kratke noge laži (odgovor Borisu Budenu)" [Short Legs of Lies (reply to Boris Buden)] (in Serbo-Croatian). Zagreb: Slobodni Filozofski. CROSBI 951612. Archived from the original on 26 August 2018.
- Kordić, Snježana (2019). "Reakcije na Deklaraciju o zajedničkom jeziku" [Reactions to the Declaration on the common language] (PDF). Njegoševi dani 7: zbornik radova s međunarodnog naučnog skupa, Kotor 30.8.-3.9.2017 (in Serbo-Croatian). Nikšić: Univerzitet Crne Gore, Filološki fakultet. pp. 145–152. ISBN 978-86-7798-062-7. S2CID 231517900. SSRN 3452730. CROSBI 1019779. Archived (PDF) from the original on 27 September 2019.
- Krajišnik, Đorđe (18 April 2017). "Zašto ciče bardovi nacional-lingvistike" [Why do the Bards of National-Linguistics Squall?] (in Serbo-Croatian). Belgrade: XXZ regionalni portal. Archived from the original on 21 April 2017.
- Lucić, Predrag (3 April 2017). "Deklaracija o SAO Rijeci" [Declaration on SAO Rijeka] (in Serbo-Croatian). Rijeka: Novi list. ISSN 1334-1545. Archived from the original on 7 May 2017.
- Lukić, Marija (2020). "Declaración sobre la langua común" [Declaration on the Common Language]. ¿A quién partenece (nuestra) lengua?. La lucha para la paz lingüística en los Balcanes. El serbocroata entre el recuerdo, el rechazo y el anhelo [To whom does (our) language belong? The struggle for linguistic peace in the Balkans. The Serbo-Croatian between memory, rejection and longing] (PDF). tesis doctoral (in Spanish). Granada: Universidad de Granada. pp. 168–182.
- Markovina, Dragan (30 March 2017). "Zašto sam potpisao Deklaraciju o zajedničkom jeziku" [Why I have signed the Declaration on the Common Language]. Telegram (in Serbo-Croatian). Zagreb. ISSN 1849-7667. Archived from the original on 31 May 2017.
- Methadžović, Almir (2 April 2018). "Chomsky u autobusu" [Chomsky on the Bus] (in Serbo-Croatian). Mostar: Tačno.net. Archived from the original on 10 April 2018.

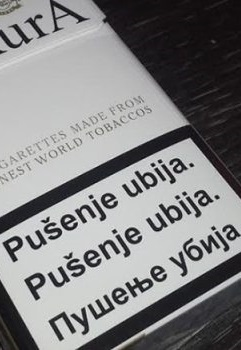
Health warning "smoking kills" from Bosnia-Herzegovina repeats a phrase three times: twice in the Latin script and once in Cyrillic.

- Mustafić, Dino (31 March 2018). "Mustafić za N1: Govorimo jedan jezik, razumijemo se" [Mustafić for N1: We Speak the Same Language, We Understand Each Other]. TV show Novi dan (host Merima Šemić) (in Serbo-Croatian). Sarajevo: N1. Archived from the original on 7 August 2018. min 17:36
- Nezirović, Elvedin (30 March 2017). "Predstavljanje Deklaracije o zajedničkom jeziku" [Presentation of the Declaration on the Common Language] (in Serbo-Croatian). Mostar: Tačno.net. Archived from the original on 31 March 2020.
- Pančić, Teofil (30 March 2017). "1, 2, 3, 4 jezika... 4, 3, 2, 1 jezik" [1, 2, 3, 4 languages... 4, 3, 2, 1 language]. Vreme: Nedeljnik (in Serbo-Croatian). Belgrade: Vreme. ISSN 0353-8028. Archived from the original on 26 August 2017.
- Pančić, Teofil (4 May 2017). "Mučno, zabavno i poučno" [Painful, funny and instructive]. Vreme: Nedeljnik (in Serbo-Croatian). Belgrade: Vreme. ISSN 0353-8028. Archived from the original on 8 July 2017.
- Pavelić, Boris (30 March 2017). "Provokacija zdravim razumom" [Provocation by Common Sense] (in Serbo-Croatian). Rijeka: Novi list. ISSN 1334-1545. Archived from the original on 5 June 2017.
- Pilsel, Drago (6 April 2017). "Zašto Deklaracija o zajedničkom jeziku" [Why a Declaration on the Common Language] (in Serbo-Croatian). Belgrade: Ekspres. Archived from the original on 1 June 2017.
- Pilsel, Drago (17 April 2017). "Bozanić opet prijeti: ne zazivamo Jugoslaviju niti prijeti novi rat!" [Bozanić Threatens Again: Neither We Invoke Yugoslavia nor a New War Threatens!] (in Serbo-Croatian). Zagreb: Autograf.hr. ISSN 1849-143X. Archived from the original on 22 May 2017.
- Pilsel, Drago (17 April 2017). "Bozanić čestita samo sviti i vjernicima koji su u katedrali" [Bozanić Congratulates Only Those Who Are in the Cathedral]. TV show Novi dan (host Tihomir Ladišić) (in Serbo-Croatian). Zagreb: N1. Archived from the original on 23 May 2017. min 13:00
- Slapšak, Svetlana (19 September 2017). "Okolina jezika" [Language Environment] (in Serbo-Croatian). Belgrade: Peščanik. Archived from the original on 22 September 2017.
- Tomičić, Ladislav (31 March 2017). "Provokacija!" [Provocation!]. Večer (in Slovenian). Maribor. ISSN 0350-4972. Archived from the original on 25 January 2019.
- Tomičić, Ladislav (15 April 2017). "Račvasti jezik kardinala Bozanića" [Cardinal Bozanić's Forked Tongue] (in Serbo-Croatian). Rijeka: Novi list. ISSN 1334-1545. Archived from the original on 21 May 2017.
- Tomić, Ante (29 March 2017). "Zašto sam potpisao Deklaraciju o zajedničkom jeziku Hrvata, Srba, Bošnjaka i Crnogoraca" [Why I Have Signed the Declaration on the Common Language of Croats, Serbs, Bosniaks and Montenegrins]. Jutarnji list (in Serbo-Croatian). Zagreb. ISSN 1331-5692. Archived from the original on 3 April 2017.
- Tomić, Ante; Ilić, Saša (16 April 2017). "Na kom jeziku razgovaraju Grabar-Kitarović i Vučić? (intervju vodio Omer Karabeg)" [Which Language do Grabar-Kitarović and Vučić Talk In? (interviewed by Omer Karabag)]. Radio Slobodna Evropa (in Serbo-Croatian). Prag: Radio Free Europe/Radio Liberty. Archived from the original on 20 April 2017.
- Tripunovski, Stiven (2017). "Gemeinsamkeit wider Willen? Sprache im südslawischen Raum" [Commonality Against the Will? Language in the South Slavic Area]. In Grunert, Heiner; Kührer-Wielach, Florian (eds.). Grenzen im Fluss (in German). Regensburg: Regensburg Schnell et Steiner. pp. 30–31. ISBN 978-3-7917-2940-4. OCLC 1011631323.
- Vajzović, Hanka; Kordić, Snježana (20 March 2018). "Jezičke nesuglasice" [Linguistic Disagreements]. TV show Kontekst (in Serbo-Croatian). Al Jazeera. Archived from the original on 24 March 2018. Alt URL min 15:47
- Vučić, Nikola (7 May 2017). "Reagiranje na tekst Nikole Petkovića o jeziku" [Reaction to the Nikola Petković's Text on Language] (in Serbo-Croatian). Zagreb: Autograf.hr. ISSN 1849-143X. Archived from the original on 16 May 2017.

== See also ==
- Serbo-Croatian language
- Illyrian (South Slavic)
- Sociolinguistics
- Novi Sad Agreement
- Vienna Literary Agreement
- Dialects of Serbo-Croatian
- Serbo-Croatian standard language
- Serbo-Croatian grammar
- Serbo-Croatian phonology
- Shtokavian
- Serbo-Croatian pluricentric language
- Croatian variant
- Serbian variant
- Bosnian variant
- Montenegrin variant
- Comparison of Serbo-Croatian standard varieties
- Language secessionism in Serbo-Croatian

== Notes ==
a. Participants: Borka Pavićević, Rajka Glušica and Snježana Kordić; Moderator: Sandra Zlotrg

b. Participants: Ivana Bodrožić, Balša Brković and Asim Mujkić; Moderator: Igor Štiks

c. Participants: Nerzuk Ćurak and Vladimir Arsenijević; Moderator: Žarka Radoja

d. Participants: Tomislav Longinović, Viktor Ivančić, Snježana Kordić, Boris Buden and Mate Kapović; Moderator: Katarina Peović Vuković

e. Participants: Teofil Pančić, Dragan Markovina, Snježana Kordić and Igor Štiks; Moderator: Vladimir Arsenijević and Ana Pejović

f. Participants: Dragan Bjelogrlić, Snježana Kordić, Marko Šelić Marčelo, Vladimir Arsenijević and Vlatko Sekulović; Moderator: Milena Bogavac Minja

g. Participants: Ivan Ivanji, Goran Miletić, Mirjana Đurđević, Srđan Tešin and Pero Zlatar; Moderator: Eržika Pap Reljin

h. Participants: Rajka Glušica, Ivo Pranjković, Snježana Kordić, Ranko Bugarski, Vladimir Arsenijević and Svein Mønnesland; Moderator: Nikola Vučić
