= Enver Kazaz =

Bosnian literary historian, literary critic, writer, social commentator and publicist

Enver Kazaz Енвер Казаз
- Born: 15 January 1962 (age 64); Kamenice, PR Bosnia and Herzegovina, Yugoslavia
- Education: University of Sarajevo University of Belgrade
- Occupations: Literary historian, Literary critic, Poet, Publicist
- Writing career
- Period: 1991–present

Enver Kazaz (Serbo-Croatian Cyrillic: Енвер Казаз; born 15 January 1962) is a Bosnian literary historian, literary critic, writer, social commentator and publicist. He is a Centennial Professor and head of the department of Croatian literature in the wider department of comparative literature of the University of Sarajevo.

== Biography ==
He was born in the village of Kamenica, a part of the municipality of Ilijaš to a Bosniak family. He studied South Slavic literature at the University of Sarajevo where he graduated in 1985. He earned his post-graduate degree from the University of Belgrade Faculty of Philology in 1991 with a thesis on the spirit of modernity in Musa Ćazim Ćatić's poetry. In 2000, he earned his PhD from the University of Sarajevo with a thesis on Bosniak novelists of the 20th century. He had worked as a researcher in the Sarajevo-based Institute for Literature from 1986 to 1992. He has been a Centennial Professor, head of the department of Croatian literature and comparative Slavic Studies since 1996. Since 2005, he is a visiting professor at the University of Warsaw. He was one of the founders of the Zoro publishing house and the founder and editor-in-chief of the literary journal Lica. He is also one of the founders of the Open University of Sarajevo. He is a noted left-wing social and political commentator and activist. In 2017, he has signed the Declaration on the Common Language of the Croats, Serbs, Bosniaks and Montenegrins.

== Selected bibliography ==
- Musa Ćazim Ćatić – književno naslijeđe i duh moderne, Centar za kulturu, Tešanj 1997.
- Morfologija palimpsesta, Centar za kulturu, Tešanj 1999.
- Antologija BH priče (co-authored by Ivan Lovrenović and Nikola Kovač,) Alef, Sarajevo 2000.
- Bošnjački roman XX vijeka, Naklada Zoro, Zagreb-Sarajevo 2004.
- Neprijatelj ili susjed u kući, Rabic, Sarajevo 2008.
- Traži se. Međunarodni centar za mir, Sarajevo 1996. (poezija).
- Subverzivne poetike, Sinopsys, Zagreb-Sarajevo, 2012.
- Rat i priče iz cijelog svijeta, (koautor Ivan Lovrenović) Novi liber, Zagreb, 2009.
- Unutarnji prijevodi, (co-authored by Davor Beganović), Naklada Ljevak-Karver, Zagreb-Podgorica, 2011.
- Na razvalinama, Synopsis (Sarajevo, 2014).- (poezija)
