= Asim Mujkić =

Bosnian philosopher and sociologist

- Born: 11 May 1968 (age 58); Brčko, SFR Yugoslavia

Education
- Education: University of Sarajevo

Philosophical work
- Era: Contemporary philosophy
- Region: Western Philosophy
- School: Continental philosophy
- Main interests: Pragmatism, Neo-Marxism, Ethics, Ethnic nationalism, Existentialism

Asim Mujkić (Serbo-Croatian Cyrillic: Асим Мујкић; born 11 May 1968) is a Bosnian philosopher and sociologist. Educated at the University of Sarajevo, he works in the areas of ethics, phenomenology, philosophy of existence, philosophy of identity, social and political theory and theories on ethnicity. He has written particularly extensively on ethnicity and identity, ethnic phenomenology, existentialism, and on the works and thought of Richard Rorty and John Rawls. He is a professor at the University of Sarajevo.

== Biography ==
He studied philosophy and sociology at the University of Sarajevo where he graduated in 1991. He earned his post-graduate degree from the same institution in 1998 with a thesis on the neopragmatism of Richard Rorty. In 2002 he earned his PhD with a thesis on the antiessentialist character of the philosophy of pragmatism. He was named Centennial Professor and head of the department of philosophy at the Faculty of Political Science in Sarajevo, lecturing on the subjects of introductory philosophy, ethics and political ethics. He is the chairman of the Association of Bosnian political scientists, as well as the deputy editor-in-chief of the Odjek journal for the arts and humanities. He is one of the founders of the Open University of Sarajevo. In 2017, he has signed the Declaration on the Common Language of the Croats, Serbs, Bosniaks and Montenegrins.

== Selected bibliography ==
- Neopragmatizam Richarda Rortyja, University of Sarajevo, Sarajevo, 1999.
- Kratka povijest pragmatizma, University of Sarajevo, Sarajevo, 2005.
- Mi, građani Etnopolisa, University of Sarajevo, Sarajevo, 2007.
- Pravda i etnonacionalizam, University of Sarajevo, Sarajevo, 2010.
