= Kusin (disambiguation) =

Kusin (German: Küssin) is a village in Poland. Kusin may also refer to

- Kusín, a village and municipality in Slovakia
- Igor Kusin (born 1963), Yugoslav linguist and author

== See also ==
- Kuzin
- Kusin Ch'utu, a mountain in Bolivia
