= Boban Stojanović =

Boban Stojanović may refer to:

- Boban Stojanović (footballer) (born 1979), Serbian football striker
- Boban Stojanović (activist) (born 1978), Serbian LGBT activist
