= Natalia Długosz =

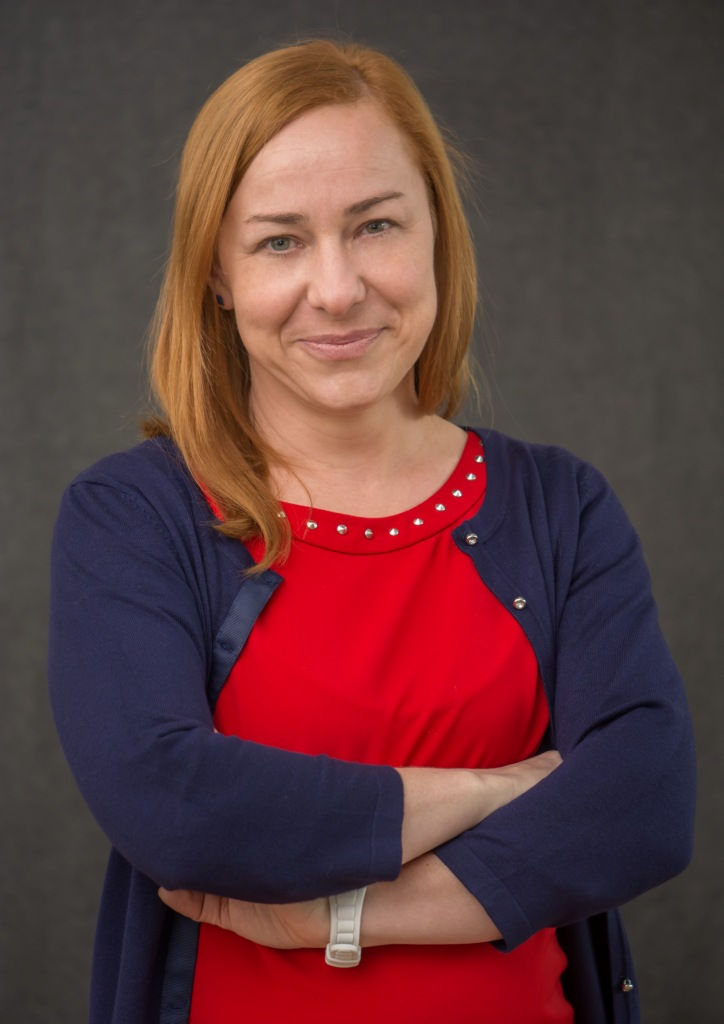
- Born: Natalia Reczek; 1978 (age 47–48); Grodzisk Wielkopolski, Poland
- Citizenship: Polish
- Occupations: university professor, researcher, sworn translator
- Title: Doctor of Science (doktor habilitowany)
- Spouse: Piotr Długosz

Academic background
- Education: Adam Mickiewicz University in Poznań
- Thesis: Słowotwórstwo polskich i bułgarskich deminutywów rzeczownikowych (Word formation of Polish and Bulgarian noun diminutives) (2007)

Academic work
- Discipline: Slavic studies
- Institutions: Adam Mickiewicz University in Poznań
- Main interests: Polish-Bulgarian confrontational word formation, cognitive linguistics, Gorani language
- Notable works: O znakach ubezwłasnowolnionych, czyli o nowych polskich i bułgarskich compositach bezafiksalnych w medialnym dyskursie publicystycznym (2017)

Natalia Długosz (born 1978) is a Polish linguist, Slavist and university professor at Adam Mickiewicz University in Poznań. She specialises in South Slavic languages (Bulgarian, Croatian, Macedonian) and selected problems of cognitive linguistics. In addition, she works as a sworn translator of Bulgarian and is involved in the popularisation of Silesian culture.

== Life and career ==
She studied Bulgarian philology and also Croatian and Serbian philology at Adam Mickiewicz University in Poznań. In 2007 she defended her doctoral thesis entitled Budowa słowotwórcza rzeczownikowych formacji deminutywnych w języku polskim i w języku bułgarskim written under the supervision of Tadeusz Lewaszkiewicz (in 2009 it came out as a book publication under the title Słowotwórstwo polskich i bułgarskich deminutywów rzeczownikowych, literally: Word formation of Polish and Bulgarian noun diminutives). In 2018, she habilitated on the basis of her book entitled O znakach ubezwłasnowolnionych, czyli o nowych polskich i bułgarskich compositach bezafiksalnych w medialnym discursie publicystycznym, literally: On the incapacitated signs, i.e. on the new Polish and Bulgarian non-affixal compounds in media journalistic discourse. She is also a graduate of Psychology in Management programme at Wrocław University of Economics and Business. She also completed the Academic Tutor Training Programme at Collegium Wratislaviense, where she obtained accreditation as an Academic Tutoring Practitioner.

She was employed as an assistant professor and later as a university professor at the Institute of Slavonic Philology in the Faculty of Polish and Classical Philology at Adam Mickiewicz University. She is a member of the Slavonic Commission of the Poznań branch of the Polish Academy of Sciences and a member of the Council of Disciplines of Linguistics and Literary Studies at Adam Mickiewicz University. She is also a member of the International Sociolinguistic Society "Acad. Mihail Videnov". She has collaborated with, among others, the Bulgarian Academy of Sciences, the Prague School of Creative Communication and the universities of St Andrews and Kansas. In 2017, she signed the Declaration on the Common Language of the Croats, Serbs, Bosniaks and Montenegrins.

In total, she has published dozens of books, academic articles, chapters in monographs and dictionary entries on Slavic topics. In them, she has mainly dealt with the issues of Polish-Bulgarian confrontational word formation and cognitive-communicative description of the meaning of new lexical units, as well as with selected elements of the Slavic linguistic worldview (the opposition self/non-self, the image of the family, the concept of Europe in Bulgarian culture), legal terminology in translation and Slavic minority languages, in particular Gorani. In 2014, she received an award from the Ministry of Culture of the Republic of Bulgaria for her contribution to the development of Bulgarian-Polish cultural relations and the popularisation of Bulgarian culture. Initiator and co-creator, together with Professor Wojciech Jóźwiak of Adam Mickiewicz University, of the first (2025) and second (2026) editions of the Bulgarian Cinema Review in Poznań; Executive Director of the Bulgarian Cinema Review. In addition, she has been working as a sworn translator of Bulgarian since 2012.

She lives in Kotórz Mały, where, together with her husband Piotr, she runs the Silesia Progress publishing house involved in the promotion of Silesian culture and language. In 2022, she was awarded the ‘Genius Loci - Faithful Guardian of the Silesian Land’ award for this activity. She is also a member of the programme board of the publishing series Canon Silesiae – Ślōnskŏ Bibliŏtyka. She publishes popular texts on the regional portal on Silesian topics wachtyrz.eu. She translated Filip Rožek’s book Gump: Pes, který naučil lidi žít from Czech into Polish.

== Selected bibliography ==
- Długosz, Natalia; Eftimova, Andreana (2023). Syndrom postcovidowy w języku. Polsko-bułgarskie studium przypadku. Raport z badań eksperymentalnych (in Polish). Poznań: Wydawnictwo Naukowe UAM. ISBN 978-83-232-4207-9.
- Długosz, Natalia (2023). "Goranci (Gorani), Language of the". In Marc L. Greenberg; Lenore A. Grenoble (eds.). Encyclopedia of Slavic Languages and Linguistics Online. Brill. pp. 379–390. doi:10.1163/2589-6229_ESLO_COM_036103.
- Długosz, Natalia (2023). "Syntactic Reduplications of the dremla dremlesta Type Within the Gorani Ethnolect". Annales Universitatis Mariae Curie-Skłodowska, Sectio FF – Philologiae. XLI (1): 229–237. doi:10.17951/ff.2023.41.1.229-237 (inactive 1 July 2025). ISSN 0239-426X.
- Długosz, Natalia (2022). "Семейство (rodzina) w systemie aksjologicznym Bułgarów". I Międzynarodowy Kongres Etnolingwistyczny. Tom 4: Nazwy wartości i koncepty kulturowe. Hierarchie i rekonstrukcje (in Polish). Vesselina Valkanova, Andreana Eftimova. Lublin: Wydawnictwo UMCS. pp. 77–89. ISBN 978-83-227-9613-9.
- Długosz, Natalia (2022). "За компонента менте-/-менте в българския журналистически медиен дискурс (когнитивно-комуникативен похват)". Медийна грамотност: Класически и нови измерения / Media Literacy: Classical And New Dimensions (in Bulgarian). Stanisława Niebrzegowska-Bartmińska, Joanna Szadura, Beata Żywicka (ed.). Софиа: Факултет по журналистика и масова комуникация, Софийски университет „Св. Кл. Охридски”. pp. 322–336. ISBN 978-619-7567-12-0.
- Długosz, Natalia (2021). "Obraz autochtonki w powieści Heleny Buchner „Hanyska"". Wspólnota. Formy – historie – horyzonty (in Polish). Telicki Marcin i others (ed.). Poznań: Wydawnictwo Naukowe UAM. pp. 379–390. ISBN 978-83-232-39-35-2.
- Długosz, Natalia (2020). "Co broda mówi o mężczyźnie? O bułgarskim językowo-kulturowym obrazie brody". Slavica Wratislaviensia (in Polish). 174: 35–46. doi:10.19195/0137-1150.174.3. ISSN 0137-1150.
- Długosz, Natalia (2020). "Bałkańskie cechy języka Goran w zakresie słowotwórstwa (na przykładzie wybranych formacji słowotwórczych)". Zeszyty Łużyckie (in Polish). 54: 165–178. doi:10.32798/zl.724. ISSN 0867-6364.
- Długosz, Natalia (2017). O znakach ubezwłasnowolnionych, czyli o nowych polskich i bułgarskich compositach bezafiksalnych w medialnym dyskursie publicystycznym (in Polish). Poznań: Wydawnictwo Naukowe UAM. ISBN 978-83-232-3257-5.
- Długosz, Natalia (2015). "Język jako narzędzie kształtowania postaw proekologicznych - o polskich i bułgarskich złożeniach z komponentem eko- w dyskursie publicznym". Poznańskie Studia Slawistyczne (in Polish). 8: 333–348. doi:10.14746/pss.2015.8.21. ISSN 2084-3011.
- Długosz, Natalia (2013). "Polskie i bułgarskie umowy prawa cywilnego jako teksty modelowe i ich zastosowanie w dydaktyce przekładu". Rocznik Przekładoznawczy. Studia nad teorią, praktyką i dydaktyką przekładu (in Polish). 8: 95–106. ISSN 1896-4362.
- Natalia Długosz (2012). Zvonko Dimoski (ed.). Tabu w oku szeroko otwartym (in Polish). Poznań: Wydawnictwo Rys. ISBN 978-83-60517-83-3.
- Długosz, Natalia (2009). Słowotwórstwo polskich i bułgarskich deminutywów rzeczownikowych (in Polish). Poznań: Wydawnictwo Poznańskie. ISBN 978-83-7177-755-4.
- Translation from Czech into Polish: Filip Rožek, Gump. Pies, który nauczył ludzi żyć. Kotórz Mały: Wydawnictwo Silesia Progress. ISBN 978-83-65558-89-5.
