= Ivan Klajn =

Serbian linguist (1937–2021)

- Иван Клајн
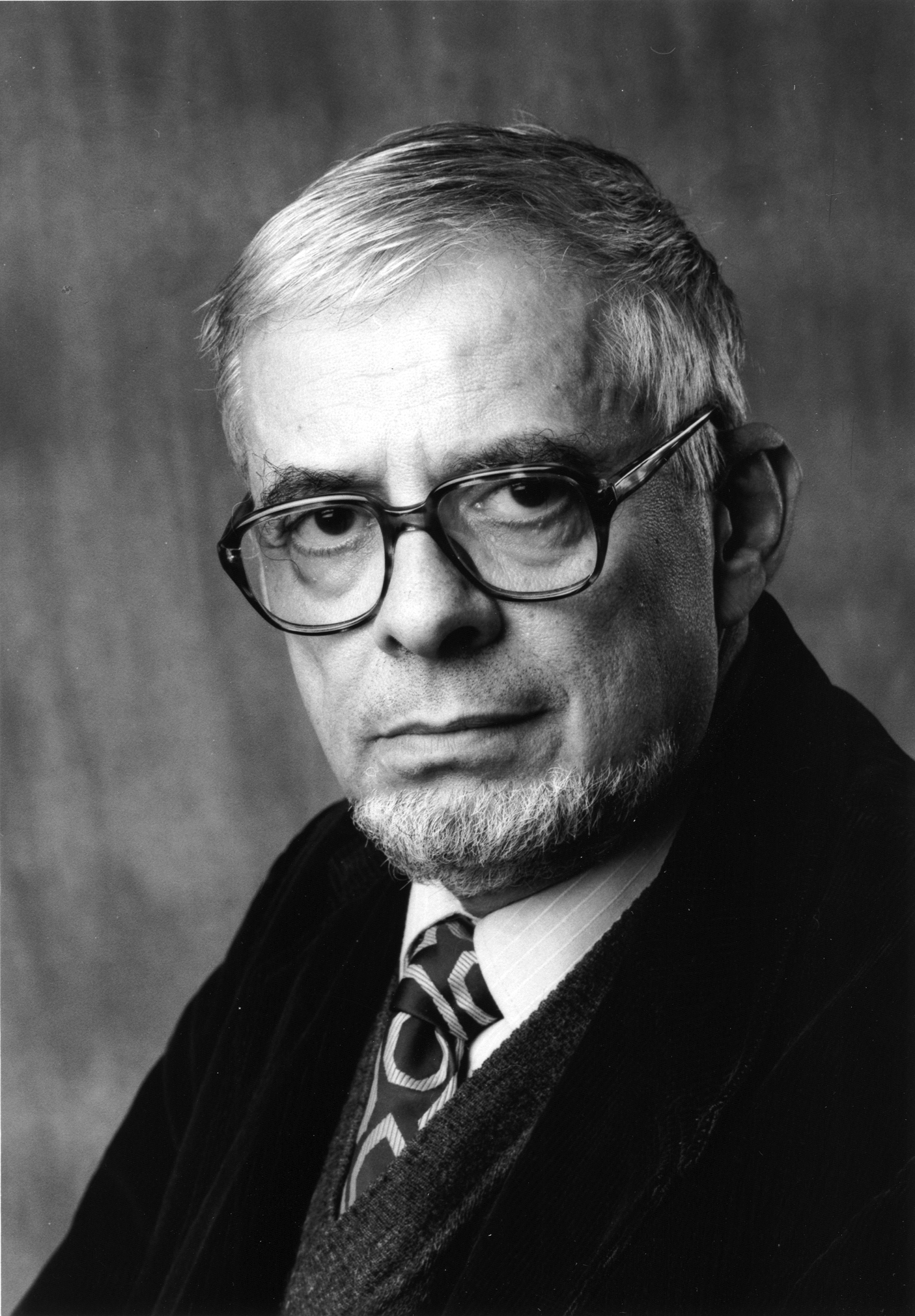
- Born: 31 January 1937; Belgrade, Yugoslavia (now Serbia)
- Died: 31 March 2021 (aged 84); Belgrade, Serbia
- Occupations: Linguist, philologist, language historian

Ivan Klajn (Serbo-Croatian Cyrillic: Иван Клајн, pronounced [ǐʋan klâjn]; 31 January 1937 – 31 March 2021) was a Serbian linguist, philologist and language historian, with primary interest in Romance languages and Serbian. He was a regular member of the Serbian Academy of Sciences and Arts, and the editor-in-chief of the Matica srpska's journal Jezik danas.

== Biography ==
Klajn was born in Belgrade to Hugo Klajn, a physician and psychoanalyst, whose Croatian-Jewish family had lived in Vukovar for generations, and Stana Đurić, who was a pianist from a Serbian merchant family. During World War II, they were separated because his father went into hiding to avoid Nazi persecution, which claimed the lives of several of his sisters. They rejoined by the end of the war, and his father was later a theatre director. His mother was a musicologist who travelled to the US in the 1950s, and introduced Ivan to Ljubica Marić who would teach him music theory. His mother spoke French and his father spoke German, and he learned English from an interest in jazz. Klajn served his military service in Zagreb where he met his father's friend Miroslav Krleža.

He completed the studies of the Italian language and literature at the University of Belgrade Faculty of Philology. After graduation, he started working at the same faculty, becoming a regular professor of the Italian language and the comparative grammar of Romance languages. Beside Romance Studies, his interest also lies in the language morphology, linguistic consultancy and the standardization of the modern Serbian language. His major works are the Rečnik jezičkih nedoumica ('The dictionary of linguistic dilemmas'), Tvorba reči u savremenom srpskom jeziku ('Morphology in modern Serbian language', 2 volumes) and Italijansko-srpski rečnik ('Italian-Serbian dictionary').

In 2017, he signed the Declaration on the Common Language of the Croats, Serbs, Bosniaks and Montenegrins.

Klajn died from COVID-19 on 31 March 2021, in Belgrade at the age of 84.

== Books and articles ==
In 1974 he started writing weekly columns on the problems of modern Serbo-Croatian, first in Borba, and afterward in Politika and NIN.

He was the editor-in-chief of the linguistic journal Jezik danas ('Language today'), published by Matica srpska. He published a number of papers in linguistic journals, as well as 18 books:

- Ispeci pa reci
- Istorijska gramatika španskog jezika
- Italijansko-srpski rečnik (2 editions)
- Uticaji engleskog jezika u italijanskom (1971)
- Jezik oko nas (1980)
- Lingvističke studije (2000)
- O funkciji i prirodi zamenica (1985)
- Pisci i pismenjaci (1994)
- Razgovori o jeziku (1978)
- Rečnik jezičkih nedoumica (6 editions)
- Rečnik novih reči (1992)
- Stranputice smisla
- Tvorba reči u savremenom srpskom jeziku - Volume I (2002)
- Tvorba reči u savremenom srpskom jeziku - Volume II (2003)

In co-authorship with Pavle Ivić, Mitar Pešikan and Branislav Brborić he wrote Jezički priručnik ('Language manual'), published by Radio Television Belgrade (1991). In the miscellany Srpski jezik na kraju veka ('Serbian language at the end of century') he wrote a part dealing with lexis. His Rečnik jezičkih nedoumica ('The dictionary of language dilemmas') was reprinted in 6 editions. For his Italijansko-srpski rečnik ('Italian-Serbian dictionary', 2nd edition, 2000), he received an award from the Italian government.

== Translation ==
He translated a number of books from Italian and English. His translation of the Giordano Bruno's Il Candelaio ('The Torchbearer'; Serbian: Svećar) was played at the Atelje 212 in Belgrade. He was one of the editors of the Serbian edition of the Cambridge Encyclopedia of Languages (Nolit, Belgrade, 1995), and of the translators of the Serbian edition of the Encyclopedic dictionary of modern linguistics (Nolit, Belgrade, 1988).

== Memberships ==
He was a member of the Council of the Vukova zadužbina ('Vuk's endowment') and the Board for Standardization of the Serbian Language. He was a member and the contributor of Matica srpska.
