= Jasna Šamić =

Bosnian writer (born 1949)

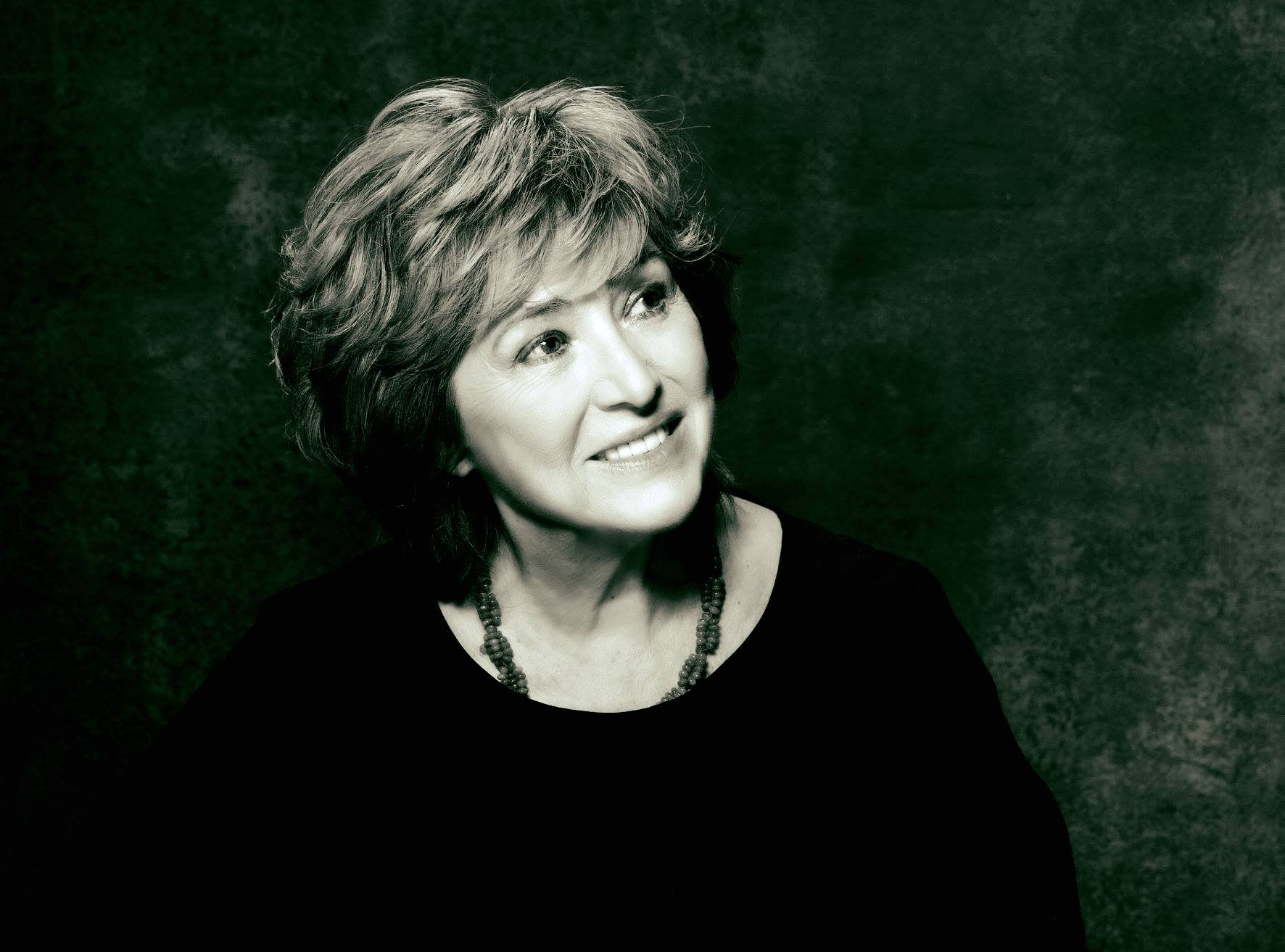
- Born: 1 April 1949 (age 77); Sarajevo, PR Bosnia and Herzegovina, FPR Yugoslavia
- Occupation: Writer

Jasna Šamić (born 1 April 1949) is a Bosnian and French writer, author of books (poetry, novels, short stories, essays, research work, theater plays) written both in the French and Bosnian languages.

== Biography ==
Jasna Šamić was born on 1 April 1949 in Sarajevo, FPR Yugoslavia (modern-day Bosnia and Herzegovina), where she graduated from elementary school and high school, and from the University of Sarajevo, where she studied oriental languages and literatures, Turkish, Arabic, and Persian. At the University of Sarajevo, she submitted a post-graduated thesis in general linguistics and Turkology, and received a PhD degree from The Faculty of Philosophy of Sarajevo in 1977. At the University of Paris, Sorbonne Nouvelle, she obtained a national doctorate (Doctorat d' Etatès Lettres) in 1984, on Sufism and history.

Šamić started as an assistant professor at the Faculty of Philosophy in Sarajevo, and she was Professor of Oriental Literatures at the same faculty from 1988–1992, until she was expelled from the faculty without reason. She was also Director of Research associated with the French National Centre for Scientific Research (CNRS) in 1992, and Professor of Languages, Literatures, History and Civilisation of the Balkans at Marc Bloch University, in Strasbourg, 2000–2002. She collaborated with French radio programs: Radio France Internationale, 1986–1993; France Culture, 1992–1996.

In Sarajevo, Šamić was director of the literary review Književna riječ, 1973; vice president of the Department of Oriental Studies at the Faculty of Philosophy, 1980–1984; vice president of the Union of Translators of Bosnia and Herzegovina, 1982–1985; member of the reading panel or editorial board at the publishing house of Veselin Masleša, Sarajevo, until 1992; and member of the editorial board of the review Kulture Istoka, Belgrade, until 1992.

She has been a member of The Asian Society (Sociétéasiatique), Paris, from 1984; a member of the Union of Writers of Bosnia, from 1974, a member of the international PEN Club, Bosnia and Herzegovina, from 2006; a member of the Union of Writers of France (SGDLF), since 1996; and a member of the international PEN Club of France.

She collaborated at literary reviews in former Yugoslavia and in Europe; she participated at international conferences in Paris, Munich, Belgrade, Istanbul, Princeton, Philadelphia, Strasbourg, Venice, Jerusalem, Bamberg, Vienna, Tel Aviv, Berlin, Tunis, Sarajevo. She gave lectures at universities of the former Yugoslavia, until 1992; the University of Utrecht, 1993; the University of Strasbourg for the III-cycle students of Turkology and history (2000–2003); University of Grenoble (2000); University of Brussels (2006); French Culture Centre of Luxembourg (2005), The Senate, in Paris (2007). She is the director of the literary review Književna sehara.

Šamić won the Stendhal French literary prize (Lauréate du programme Missions Stendhal) in 2008; the literary prize Gauchez-Pillippot in 2014; the Prize of the Public at the Balkans Book Fair (Salon du livre des Balkans), Paris 2018; the international Naji Naaman Honorary Prize for all of her work in 2018; and several Bosnian literary prizes, namely those of the Publishing Foundation (Fodancija za izdavaštvo), Bosnia, 2015–2018.

In 2017, Šamić signed the Declaration on the Common Language of the Croats, Serbs, Bosniaks, and Montenegrins.

Since 1977, Šamić has been living in Sarajevo and Paris, but since the war in the Balkans of 1992–1995, mostly in Paris, as a freelance writer.

== Works ==
=== In French ===
- "Dîvan de Ķaimî: Vie et œuvre d'un poéte bosniaque du XVIIe siècle", Synthèse no. 24 (Paris: Institut Français d'Etudes Anatoliennes, Editions Recherche sur les Civilisations, 1986). Pp. 280.
- Le pavillon bosniaque, novel, Dorval editions, 1996
- Bosnie Pont des Deux Mondes, 1996
- Histoire inachevée, short stories, éd. de l’Oeil sauvage, Bayonne, 1996.
- L’Amoureux des oiseaux, poetry and short stories, Bf édition, Strasbourg, 2006.
- Portrait de Balthazar, novel, M.E.O., Bruxelles, 2012; Gauchez-Philippot Price.
- L'Empire des ombres, novel, Publibook, Paris, 2013.
- Le givre et la cendre, novel, M.E.O, Briuxelles, 2015;
- Trois histoires un destin, pièces de théâtre, Harmattan, 2016.
- Dans le lit d'un rêve, M.E.O., Bruxelles, 2017
- Les contrées des âmes errantes, M.E.O., Bruxelles, 2019.
- Chambre avec vue sur l'océan, novel; translated from Bosnian by the author with G. Adam, M.E.O., 2020.
- Ailleurs est le ciel, poetry, l'Harmattan, Paris, 2022.
- Le cirque russe de Lacretelle, novel, MEO, 2024

=== In Bosnian ===
- Isjećeni trenuci, poetry, Svjetlost, Sarajevo, 1973.
- Jasna Samic, U hladu druge kože, poetry, V. Masleša, Sarajevo, 1980.
- Iz bilježaka Babur Šaha, poetry, Svjetlost, Sarajevo, 1986.
- Junus Emre, Glas, Banja Luka, 1990.
- "Pariški ratni dnevnik", essay, ENES, Istanbul, 1994.
- Sjećanje na život, theater, Vodnikova domačija, Ljubljana, 1995.
- Grad ljubav smrt, theater, Vodnikova domačija, Ljubljana, 1995.
- Mraz i pepeo, novel, Bosanska knjiga, Sarajevo, 1997.
- Valcer, short stories, Media press, Sarajevo, 1998.
- Antologija savremene francuske knjizevnosti, Anthologie de la littérature française contemporaine; translation and preface of the author's, Zid, Sarajevo, 1998.
- Bosanski paviljon, novel, Svjetlost, Sarajevo 2000.
- Soba s pogledom na okean, novel, Tesanj, 2001.
- "Pariz Sarajevo 1900", monograph, Meddia press, Sarajevo, 2001;
- Portret Balthazara Castiglionea, novel, Rabic, Sarajevo, 2002.
- Drame, theater, Bosanska rijec, 2006
- Carstvo sjenki, novel, Zoro, Sarajevo-Zagreb, 2007
- Na Seni barka, short stories, Bosanska rijec, 2008
- "Mistika i mistika", essay, Plima, Cetinje, 2010.
- Mozart, novel, Sahinpasic, Sarajevo, 2013.
- "Mistika i mistika", essay, Buybook, Sarajevo, 2014.
- Na postelji od sna poetry, Bosnia and Herzegovina Publishing Award Foundation, Dobra knjiga, Sarajevo, 2015.
- Predjeli lutajućih duša, novel, first part of a trilogy, Bosnia and Herzegovina Publishing Award Foundation, Planjax, 2017.
- Carstvo sjenki, novel, Factum, Beograd, 2018.
- Svjetlo mraka, poetry, Dobra knjiga, Sarajevo, 2018.
- Deveti val, novel, Cetinje: OKF; Beograd: Factum izdavaštvo; Sarajevo: Buybook, 2018.
- Medo prekinuo seosku idilu, children's book, with illustrations by Mario Mikulić, (RABIC, Sarajevo, 2018).
- Noć je opet na pragu postelje ti, poetry, Planjax, 2020.
- Razbijeni kaleIdoskop, novel, Rabic, Sarajevo, 2021.
- Nesretan slučaj, novel, Factum, Belgrade, 2022.
- Atelje na broju 19, novel, Art Rabic, Sarajevo, 2022.
- Sarajevo moje mladosti, memories, ShuraPublications, Opatija, 2022.
- Duhovi XV arondismana, novel, Art Rabic, Sarajevo, 2023.
- "Plamen u pijesku", essay, Shura publications, Opatija, 2024.
- U Ogledalu-Uspomena, Gradovi i Lica, memories, Most Art & Factum, Belgrade, 2024.
- Mit o Bogomiliima, Most Art Jugoslavija, Zemun, 2024.

== Literary prizes ==
- Lauréate du programme Missions Stendhal;
- Gauchez-Philippot 2014;
- Prix du public du Salon du livre des Balkans, Paris;
- Naji Naaman’s Literary Prise;
- Prize of Foundations of Bosnian Publishers (2014 - 2022);
- Zlatna jabuka;
- Zheng Nian Cup

== Films ==
- Les Nakshibendis de Visoko, documentary, 1986.
- Où sont les Bektâchî de Bosnie?, documentary, 1986.
- Une ville l’amour la mort, documentary, production "Festival de toutes les cultures", Paris, 1995.
- 1900 Sarajevo Paris, documentary, production TV Bosnia and Herzégovina, 2000.
- L’Artiste et son gâteau, short, 2004.
- Bonjour mon amour, j’ai seize ans, short, 2005.
- Promenade, short; 2007.
- Quo vadis 68 Paris, Sarajevo, documentary May 68, 60', coproduction FTV and Festival Sarajevska zima.
- Coucher auprès du ciel – un souvenir mis en images, documentary, IPI, Parimages, ASJA, Paris 2010.
- A number of documentaries for Bosnian TV, TVSA 2013 - 2015.

== Theater direction ==
- Iz biljezaka Babur Saha; Pozoriste mladih, Sarajevo, 1987 (published in Iz Biljezaka Babur Saha, Svjetlost, 1986).
- Souvenir d’une vie (Memory of a lifetime), Proscenium Theatre, Paris, 1996 (published in DRAMA, Bosanska Rijec, Wuppertal-Tuzla 2007).
- Meeting (Susret), SARTR, Sarajevo, 1998 (published in Drama, Bosanska Rijec, Wuppertal-Tuzla 2007).
- Double Exile (Dvostruki exil), Sarajevo, 1999.
- Call (Telefonski poziv), based on the short story by Jasna Šamić, published in Valcer, Media press, Sarajevo), Kamerni teatar 55, Sarajevo 1999.
- Avant que n’apparraisse le Messager de la Mort, The festival Bascarsijske noci 2007, Muzej Knjizevnosti – Mak, Sarajevo, 2000 (published in l’Amoureux des oiseaux, bilingual, Bf éditions, Strasbourg, 2007.
- Miniatures, Bosnjacki Institute, Sarajevo, 2008.
- D’un Soleil à l’autre (From one sun to the other one), Maison du Patrimoine, L’Haÿ - les-Roses, 2009.
- Theater (L’aire Falguière), Paris, 2009.
- Anniversaire, text and direction by Jasna Šamić, Bar de l’Industrie, Montreil, Paris, 2011;
- Portrait de Balthazar, text and direction by Jasna Šamić, Maison des associations, Paris, 2012;
- Les souvenirs plus lourds que le roc, text and direction by Jasna Šamić, Théâtre de Syldavie, Maisons d’Europe et d’Orient, Paris, 2014
