= Srđan V. Tešin =

Serbian writer and journalist

Srđan V. Tešin (Serbian Cyrillic: Срђан В. Тешин, born 1971) is a Serbian writer and journalist.

== Biography ==
He was awarded the prestigious "Borislav Pekić" literary scholarship in 2004 and literary award DKV in 2010. His works have been translated into English, German, French, Czech, Albanian, Polish, Hungarian, Macedonian, and Slovenian. In addition, he is represented in many domestic and international literary anthologies.

Working and living in Kikinda, Serbia, he is also the editor of the online magazine Plastelin and literary magazine Severni bunker.

In 2017, he has signed the Declaration on the Common Language of the Croats, Serbs, Bosniaks and Montenegrins.

Tešin's novel "Mokrinske hronike" was shortlisted among six finalists for the 2021 NIN Award.

== Bibliography ==
=== Novels ===
- Antologija najboljih naslova (2000)
- Kazimir i drugi naslovi (2003)
- Kroz pustinju i prašinu (2005)
- Kuvarove kletve i druge gadosti (2006)
- Gori gori gori (2017)
- Moje (2019)
- Mokrinske hronike (2021)

=== Short story collections ===
- Sjajan naslov za pantomimu (1997)
- Priča za kraj veka (2000)
- Ispod crte (2010)
- Bunker (2013)
- Kuća na Ravnom Bregu (with Gojko Božović, 2013)
- Priče s Marsa (2015)

=== Children's prose ===
- Luka kaže (2020)

=== Other prose ===
- Alternativni vodič kroz Vavilon (2008) – collection of essays, columns and articles
