= Nihad Hasanović =

Bosnian writer and translator

Nihad Hasanović is a Bosnian writer and translator born in Bihać (Yugoslavia, now northwestern Bosnia and Herzegovina) in 1974.

His published works include the plays Podigni visoko baklju (Raise high your torch, 1996) and Zaista? (Really?, 2001), the collection of prose Kad su narodi nestali (When people disappear, 2003) and the novels O roštilju i raznim smetnjama (Concerning the barbecue and sundry disruptions, 2008.) and Čovjek iz podruma (The basement man, 2013.).

He has also published his poetry, essays and translations (from French, and occasionally English and Spanish) in various literary journals, both paper-based and on-line. He has translated Kenizé Mourad's novel Le jardin de Badalpour, Jean Baudrillard's L'esprit du terrorisme, and Emil Cioran's Cahier de Talamanca.

Nihad Hasanović lives and works in Sarajevo. The writer is signatory of the Declaration on the Common Language of the Croats, Serbs, Bosniaks and Montenegrins within the project Languages and Nationalisms. The declaration is against political separation of four Serbo-Croatian standard variants that leads to a series of negative social, cultural and political phenomena in which linguistic expression is enforced as a criterion of ethno-national affiliation and as a means of political loyalty in successor states of Yugoslavia.
