= Maša Kolanović =

Croatian writer (born 1979)

Maša Kolanović (born 16 November 1979) is a Croatian writer. She was born in Zagreb. She studied Croatian language and comparative literature at the University of Zagreb, where she now teaches in the Department of Croatian Studies.

Her books include:

- Sloboština Barbie (V.B.Z., Zagreb, 2008; translated into German as Underground Barbie, Prospero Verlag, Berlin-Münster, 2012)
- Poštovani kukci i druge jezive priče (Dear Insects and Other Scary Stories, Profil knjiga d.o.o., Zagreb, 2019).
- Pijavice za usamljene (Leeches for the Lonely, Student Center, Zagreb, 2001)
- Jamerika (Algoritam, Zagreb, 2013)
- Udarnik! Buntovnik? Potrošač... (Striker! Rebel? Consumer..., Naklada Ljevak, Zagreb, 2011)
- (edited) Komparativni postsocijalizam: slavenska iskustva (Comparative Postsocialism: Slavic Experiences, Zagreb, Slavic School and FF Press, Zagreb, 2013)
- (edited) The Cultural Life of Capitalism in Yugoslavia (with D. Jelača and D. Lugarić, Palgrave Macmillan, New York and London, 2017).

Poštovani kukci i druge jezive priče won the EU Prize for Literature.

In 2017, Maša Kolanović has signed the Declaration on the Common Language of the Croats, Serbs, Bosniaks and Montenegrins.
