= Drago Pilsel =

Argentine Croatian journalist

Drago Carlos Pilsel (born 21 September 1962) is an Argentine Croatian journalist and human rights activist.

== Early years ==
Drago Pilsel was born in Buenos Aires, Argentina to a politically engaged family. His parents were Croatian immigrants who came to Argentina as children after World War II. Pilsel's paternal grandfather was an Ustaše soldier. Pilsel's father, Adolf Pilsel was a member of the Croatian Liberation Movement. He was also a bodyguard to Ante Pavelić at some time.

Drago Pilsel spent his childhood in Comodoro Rivadavia where his father worked in construction. After financial troubles emerged, they moved back to Buenos Aires. His father was forced to leave him and his mother after some time and move to Paraguay.

== Activism in Argentina ==
Pilsel spent his high school years during the National Reorganization Process. He became then introduced to humans rights and journalism. In 1979, he returned to Comodoro Rivadavia for a year and started working on a TV station called Channel 9. In Buenos Aires, he graduated from the high school specialized for mechanics and started working in construction. He regularly sprayed graffiti against Yugoslavia and spread hate against it. After spending some time in São Paulo with his girlfriend in the 1980s, he became interested in the Franciscan order. He returned to Argentina and enrolled in that order. It was at that time when he rejected nationalism.

== Activism in Croatia ==
In 1989, he came to Zagreb in Yugoslavia for the first time in his life as a Franciscan. He was sent to Dalmatia for some time to learn and in 1991 he went to Rijeka to study in the Roman Catholic Archdiocese.

He left the Franciscan order in September 1991 after his brother was pronounced missing during the Croatian War of Independence. Pilsel immediately enlisted in the Croatian army and served under the future Croatian minister of defense Ante Kotromanović in Dalmatia. He left the army in 1992. In March 1992, he went to study philosophy and theology at the Catholic Faculty of Theology in Zagreb. He gave his final examinations there but ultimately graduated from the Evangelical theology faculty in Osijek.

When he was studying in Zagreb, he started working on a local TV station called Open Television (OTV) where he had his own TV show. The show mainly based itself on religious topics. He was also a long-time writer for the national newspaper Novi list (from 1995 to 2009). When it comes to other newspapers or magazines, the most notable are: Feral Tribune, Globus, Glas Koncila, Novi Plamen, and Slobodna Dalmacija. He also wrote and corresponded for foreign media companies, most notably El País (Spain), BBC (United Kingdom), Monitor (Montenegro), and Nezavisne novine (Bosnia and Herzegovina).

Drago Pilsel was one of the founding members of the Croatian Helsinki Committee, a human rights watch organization. He gained public attention during the mid-1990s when he investigated and located Serbian victims after the end of the Croatian independence war. He entered Knin shortly after Operation Storm and started working on that terrain. He also exposed Croatian war crimes in Lika and Gospić. He didn't get along with the Croatian Helsinki Committee president Ivan Zvonimir Čičak. He was expelled the Croatian Helsinki Committee in 1997. Pilsel went to Sarajevo with his wife and lived there for a couple of years.

In 2002, Pilsel lead the first Zagreb Gay Pride which at the time was a great civil rights achievement.

The same year, he was kicked out of the Croatian Christian journalists organisation. A few days earlier to that, Pilsel critically attacked a bishop and said that the Croatian Church was: "an inhuman, nationalist, catholic sect from which he wants to stay far away." Pilsel maintains a negative attitude against the Croatian cardinal Josip Bozanić and the institution of the Croatian Church. He believes that they are extremely right-wing oriented and want to manipulate politicians.

In 2017, Drago Pilsel has signed the Declaration on the Common Language of the Croats, Serbs, Bosniaks and Montenegrins.

== Political activity ==
Drago Pilsel abandoned nationalism and right-wing ideology during his time with the Franciscan order in Argentina. He described his journalist work as championing "Christian humanism, human rights culture, and anti-fascism". He was a friend and admirer of Vlado Gotovac, a famous Croatian poet and social-liberal politician during the 1990s. Pilsel helped run the 1997 presidential campaign of Vlado Gotovac, where Gotovac finished 3rd.

In 2009, he joined the presidential campaign of Ivo Josipović. After winning the 2009-10 elections, Pilsel joined the presidential office and became head of the analytics department. In March 2010, he resigned for reasons unknown but it is regarded that the true reason was his column in a local newspaper where he used extreme profanity. Pilsel denies that this was the reason.

During the Croatian parliamentary election, 2011, Pilsel ran the campaign for the independent candidate Ivan Grubišić. Grubišić won a seat in the parliament.

In 2021, Croatian and Bosnian media published that some of the Pilsel's positive commentaries on Bosnian politician Željko Komšić, were in fact paid for by Komšić himself. Pilsel subsequently admitted having an undisclosed "analytical project" with Komšić charging 1000 EUR monthly for his services, denying that he was doing a PR disguised as journalistic commentaries.
