= Senahid Halilović =

Bosnian-Herzegovinian scholar (1958–2023)

Senahid Halilović Сенахид Халиловић
- Born: 22 March 1958; Kladanj, Yugoslavia
- Died: 24 April 2023 (aged 65)
- Occupation: linguist

Senahid Halilović (Serbo-Croatian Cyrillic: Сенахид Халиловић; 22 March 1958 – 24 April 2023) was a Bosnian linguist and academician who was a member of the Academy of Sciences and Arts of Bosnia and Herzegovina. Halilović studied at the University of Belgrade where he acquired his PhD in Dialectology, exploring the East-Bosnian dialect. He published over one hundred professional and scientific papers in the field of dialectology.

== Orthography of the Bosnian language ==
Born in Kladanj on 22 March 1958, Halilović is best known for his contribution to the standardisation of the Bosnian language. His best known works are Orthography of the Bosnian language (Pravopis bosanskog jezika), The Bosnian language (Bosanski jezik) and Grammar of the Bosnian language (Gramatika bosanskoga jezika). Characteristics of this spelling is equidistance towards the Croatian and Serbian spelling and morphological prescriptions, and expressions that are held for the typical Bosnian norm (formalisation of the phoneme "h" in certain words in the Bosnian language as seen in the words mehko, lahko, kahva, mahrama). In the 2018 edition of the Orthography of the Bosnian language, Halilović accepted expressions without the phoneme "h" due to their prevalence in language practice, for which he was criticised by Bosniak prescriptivists and defended by other linguists.

== Slavic Committee ==
Halilović was a founding member and president of the Slavic Committee (Bosnia and Herzegovina Association of Slavists) in Bosnia and Herzegovina. In September 2008, the Slavic Committee was officially inducted into the International Committee of Slavists, a scholarly organisation uniting various national committees of Slavists. Halilović was signatory of the Declaration on the Common Language of the Croats, Serbs, Bosniaks and Montenegrins.

== Death ==
Halilović died on 24 April 2023, at the age of 65.

== Bibliography ==
- Bosanski jezik, Baština, Sarajevo 1991.
- Pravopis bosanskoga jezika, Preporod, Sarajevo 1996.
- Bosanskohercegovački dijalektološki zbornik : Govorni tipovi u međuriječju Neretve i Rijeke dubrovačke - knjiga VII, Institut za jezik, Sarajevo 1996.
- Gnijezdo lijepih riječi: Pravilno - nepravilno u bosanskom jeziku, Baština, Libris, Sarajevo 1996.
- Gramatika bosanskoga jezika, Dom štampe, Zenica 2000.
- Govor grada Sarajeva i razgovorni bosanski jezik, Slavistički komitet, Sarajevo 2009. COBISS 17575430
- Pravopis bosanskoga jezika, Slavistički komitet, Sarajevo, 2018.
