= Milena Dragićević Šešić =

Serbian academic (born 1954)

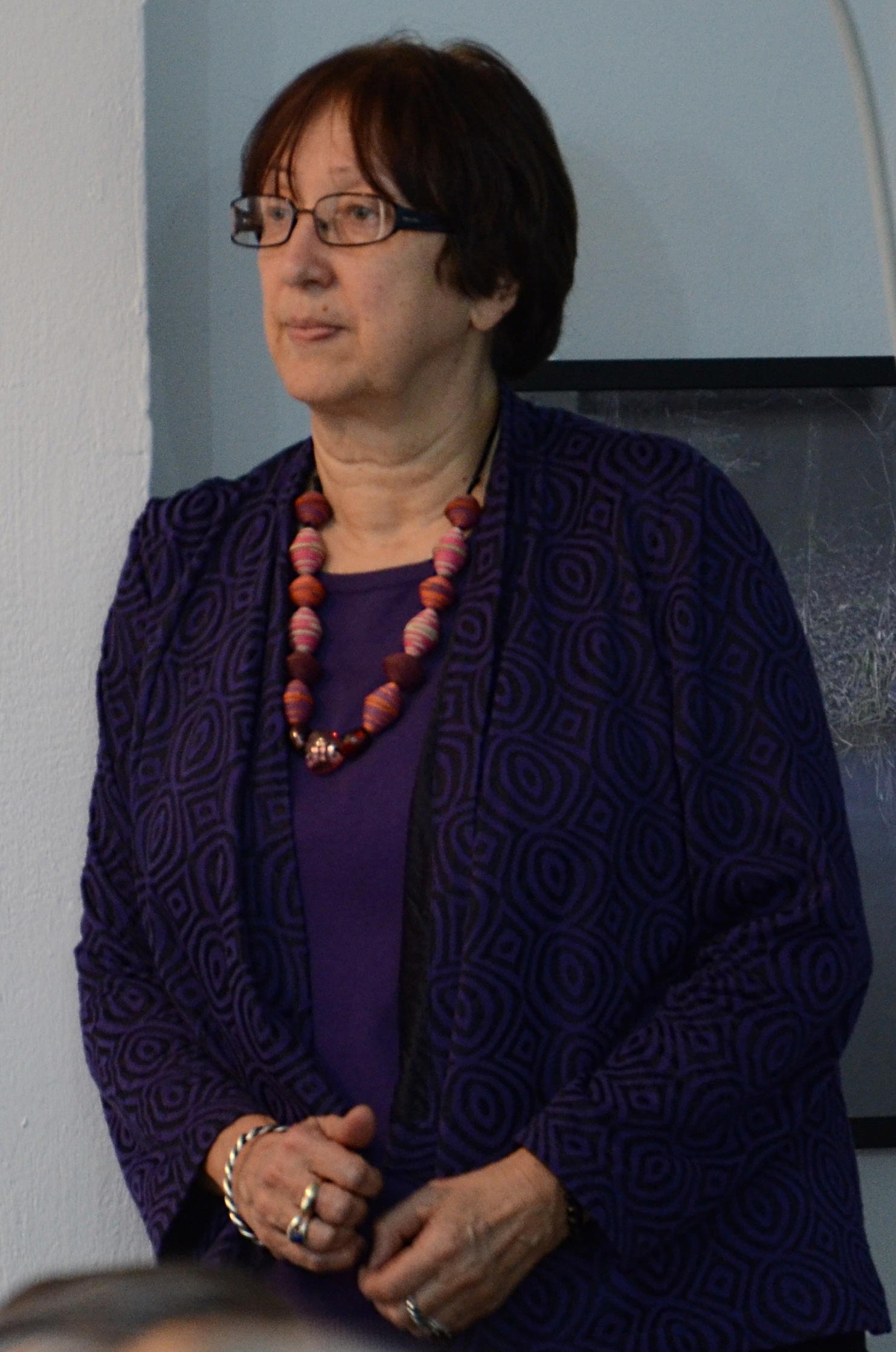
Milena Dragićević Šešić presenting a lecture in Minsk, Belarus.

Milena Dragićević Šešić (born 3, February 1954) is a Serbian academic and university professor. She is the founder of the UNESCO Chair on Interculturalism, Art Management, and Mediation. Šešić is an alumna and former president of the University of Arts in Belgrade, involved in the development and realisation of over fifty projects on cultural policy in countries around the world, including Southeast European countries such as Montenegro, Romania, Serbia, Croatia, and Bulgaria. She is a professor emerita of the University of Arts in Belgrade. Šešić is also an expert in cultural policy and management and has consulted for UNESCO, the Council of Europe, the European Cultural Foundation, and the British Council.

== Early life and education ==
Šešić was born in Trogir, Croatia, at the time in the Federal People's Republic of Yugoslavia. She attended the Faculty of Dramatic Arts, University of Arts in Belgrade, and completed her basic studies there in 1975. After this, she pursued further studies at Paris 8 University Vincennes-Saint-Denis and Université Paris-Descartes. She then studied at the University of the Arts, Belgrade, in 1981 where she completed her master's studies with a focus in French cultural policy. Šešić defended her doctoral dissertation to the University of Belgrade's Faculty of Philology and became a Doctor of Literary Sciences and Communication Studies in the year 1990.

== Career ==
Concluding her education in 1990, Šešić became the rector of the University of the Arts in Belgrade from 2000 to 2004. In 2004, she founded the UNESCO Chair on Interculturalism, Art Management, and Mediation and held the chair until 2019. Since 2012, she has been a member of the National Commission of the Republic of Serbia for UNESCO. Šešić is the current chair of the Department of Theater, Radio and Culture Management and Production at the University of the Arts, Belgrade, where she is also professor emerita.

Šešić has been a guest lecturer in universities and conferences across the world, including City, University of London, University of Warwick, the Onassis Foundation Interfaces Conference. In her lectures, she analyzes the relationship between cultural policy and national identity. This is also the focus of her publications where she and her colleagues explain the relationships between concepts such as culture, sustainability, and the arts. In 2017, she signed the Declaration on the Common Language of the Croats, Serbs, Bosniaks and Montenegrins.

Throughout her career, Šešić has been credited as having authored, edited, or co-authored over twenty published books and over two hundred essays on cultural policy, art history, and cultural organization translated into at least 17 different languages.

== Awards ==
- In December 2023, Šešić received an honorary doctorate presented to her by Emmanuel Négrier from the University of Montpellier for her contributions to developing cultural policy studies on an international level.
- Šešić became the first European Network on Cultural Management and Policy (ENCATC) laureate for her “outstanding achievements in cultural management and policy."

== Selected works ==
- Culture and Sustainability in European Cities: Imagining Europolis ISBN 9780367668884
- Arts Management in Turbulent Times: Adaptable Quality Management ISBN 9958430983
- Culture in, for and as sustainable development ISBN 978-951-39-6177-0
