= Stefan Bošković =

Montenegrin writer

Stefan Bošković is a Montenegrin writer. He was born in 1983 in Podgorica. He is known for the short story collection Transparentne životinje (2018) and the novel Šamaranje (2014). Another novel Ministar won the EU Prize for Literature. Bošković is also active in other genres, e.g. scripts for feature films and short films, TV sitcoms and documentaries. He has also written plays for the stage. In 2017, he signed the Declaration on the Common Language of the Croats, Serbs, Bosniaks and Montenegrins.
