= Ivan Ivanji =

Serbian writer (1929–2024)

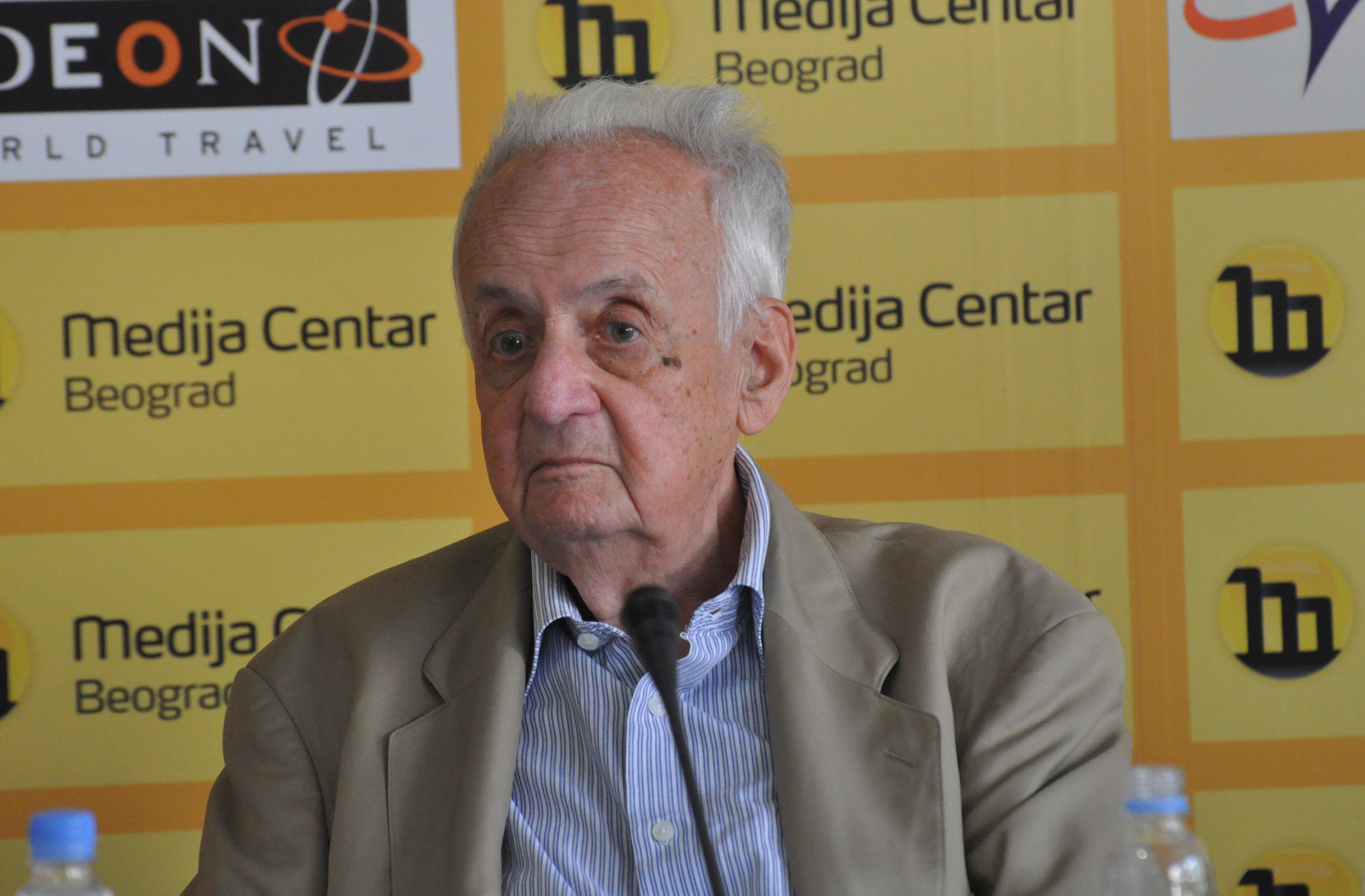
- Ivanji in 2018
- Born: 24 January 1929; Veliki Bečkerek, Kingdom of Serbs, Croats and Slovenes
- Died: 9 May 2024 (aged 95); Weimar, Thuringia, Germany
- Education: University of Belgrade Faculty of Philology
- Occupations: Novelist, translator
- Writing career
- Language: Serbian

Ivan Ivanji (Serbian Cyrillic: Иван Ивањи; 24 January 1929 – 9 May 2024) was a Serbian author of many internationally renowned novels.

== Biography ==
Ivanji was held in Auschwitz and Buchenwald during 1944 and 1945. He was Secretary General of the Yugoslav Writers' Union from 1982 to 1988. His last book was a fictionalized account of his pre-World War II experiences in the town of Zrenjanin (Betschkerek) in the Banat. He translated his own works from Serbian into German. Born in 1929 in Zrenjanin, Serbia he lived in Vienna and Belgrade.

In 2017, he signed the Declaration on the Common Language of the Croats, Serbs, Bosniaks and Montenegrins.

In April 2020, he was appointed honorary citizen of Weimar.

Ivanji died in Weimar, Thuringia, Germany on 9 May 2024, at the age of 95.

== Works of Fiction ==
- Dioklecijan. Belgrade 1973
  [East] Berlin 1976; Munich 1978, ISBN 3-471-77834-9
- Smrt za Zmajevoj steni. 1982
  . Dorsten 1984, ISBN 3-924593-02-7
- Konstantin. Belgrade 1988
  , Verlag Volk und Welt, Berlin 1988, ISBN 3-353-00326-6
- Schattenspringen. Vienna 1993, ISBN 3-85452-251-7
- Ein ungarischer Herbst, Vienna 1995, ISBN 3-85452-280-0
- Barbarossas Jude, Vienna 1996, ISBN 3-85452-299-1
- Der Aschenmensch von Buchenwald. Vienna 1999, ISBN 3-85452-429-3
- Die Tänzerin und der Krieg. Vienna 2002, ISBN 3-85452-456-0 Serbocroatian Title: Balerina i rat, 2003
- Geister aus einer kleinen Stadt, Vienna 2008, ISBN 978-3-85452-633-9

== Prizes ==
- 2011 Austrian Cross for Science and Art, I Class Extraordinary
