= Dejan Tiago-Stanković =

Serbian writer (1965–2022)

Dejan Tiago Stanković
- Дејан Тиаго Станковић
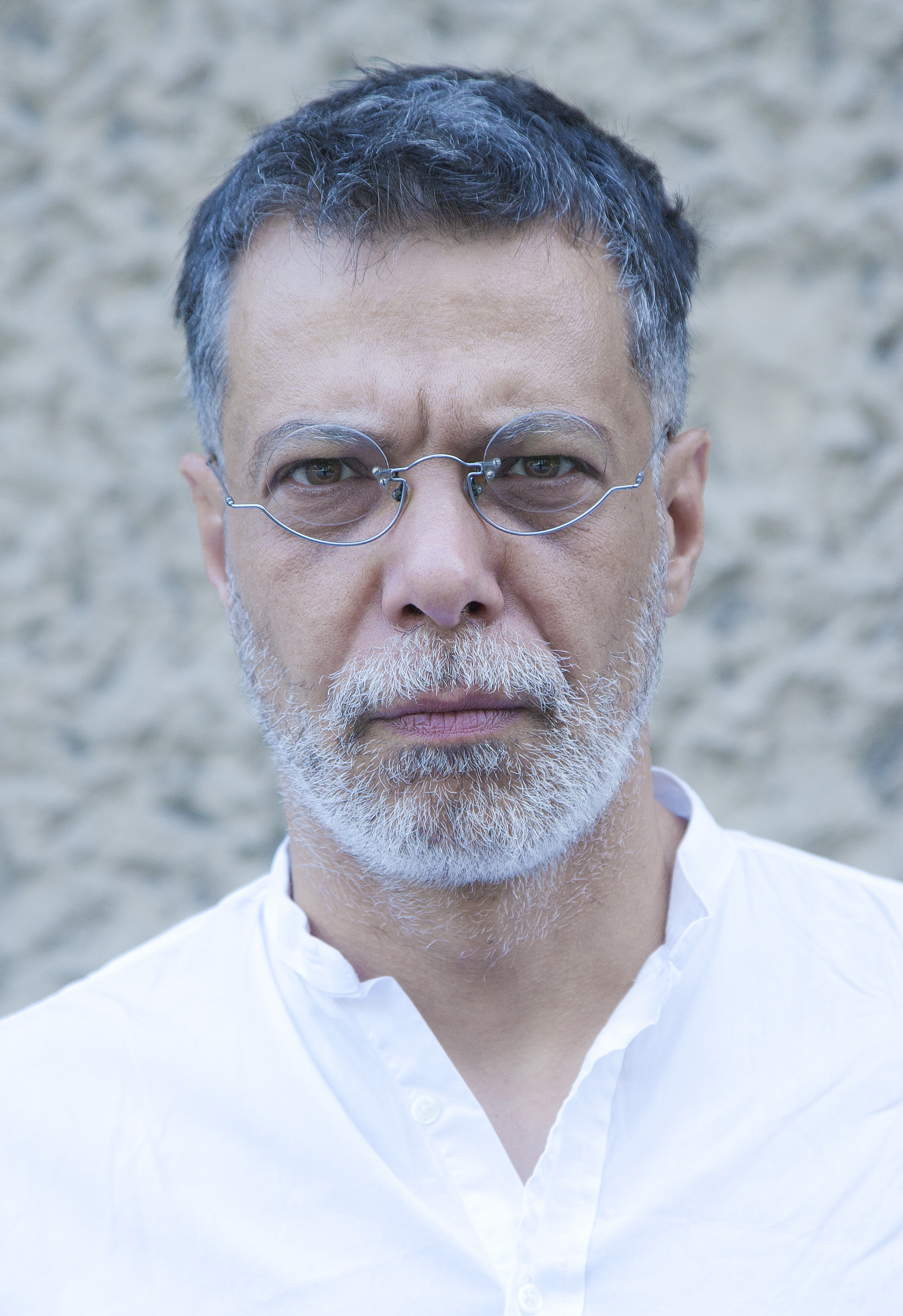
- Tiago-Stanković in 2016
- Born: Dejan Stanković; November 2, 1965; Belgrade, SFR Yugoslavia
- Died: December 20, 2022 (aged 57); Lisbon, Portugal
- Citizenship: Serbia; Portugal
- Occupations: Writer; translator; columnist
- Children: 2

Dejan Tiago-Stanković (Serbian Cyrillic: Дејан Тиаго-Станковић; 2 November 1965 – 20 December 2022) was a Serbian-born Portuguese-based writer, literary translator and columnist for the magazine NIN. As a literary translator, he made the first translations of José Saramago in Serbian as well as of Ivo Andrić in Portuguese.

Tiago Stanković published three books in Serbian: Odakle sam bila, više nisam i druge lisabonske priče (2011), Estoril (2015), and Zamalek (2020), which were also translated to English, Portuguese and Macedonian. He was recognized as one of the most read Serbian contemporary authors.

== Biography ==
Stanković was born in Belgrade, SR Serbia, SFR Yugoslavia on 2 November 1965. After graduating with a degree in architecture, he moved to London, England, where he lived until 1995. Subsequently, Stanković relocated to Lisbon, Portugal. There he pioneered translating literary works from Serbian language to Portuguese and vice versa. Among others, Stanković translated the works of Jose Saramago, Ivo Andrić and Dragoslav Mihailović.

His first book, Odakle sam bila, više nisam i druge lisabonske priče, was published under Geopoetika in 2011. It was followed by the critically acclaimed Estoril in 2015. The book was nominated several international awards, including the Serbian NIN Award and the International Dublin Literary Award. His final work, Zamalek, published through Laguna in 2020, was introduced to the school book report in Portugal.

In 2017, Tiago-Stanković signed the Declaration on the Common Language of the Croats, Serbs, Bosniaks and Montenegrins.

In the evening of 20 December 2022, Stanković died at his home in Lisbon at the age of 57.

== Bibliography ==
Books

- Tiago Stanković, Dejan (2011). Odakle sam bila, više nisam i druge lisabonske priče. Geopoetika izdavaštvo. ISBN 978-86-6145-073-0.
- Tiago Stanković, Dejan (2015). Estoril : ratni roman. Geopoetika izdavaštvo. ISBN 978-86-6145-211-6.
- Tiago Stanković, Dejan (2020). Zamalek : roman o kismetu. Laguna. ISBN 978-86-521-3625-4.

In English

- Estoril, a war novel (Head of Zeus, London 2017)
- Tales of Lisbon (Prime Books, Estoril)

In Portuguese

- Estoril, romance de guerra (Bookbuilders, Lisboa 2016.)
- Contos de Lisboa (Prime Books, Estoril)
- Lisboa ultrassecreta (Globo, São Paulo)

== Literary prizes ==
For Estoril (2015)

- Branko Ćopić Prize by Serbian Academy of Sciences and Arts (2016)
- HWA Crowns Literary Award by The Historical Writers’ Association (2018)
- European Union Prize for Literature (2021)
