= Professional conference =

A professional conference is a meeting of authorities in a given subject or profession, dealing with organizational matters, matters concerning the status of the profession, and scientific or technical developments. It differs from an academic conference in having broader goals, and usually a much broader attendance. They are normally sponsored by the professional society in the field, and usually are organized on a national basis.

Some are international, usually organized by federations or groups of the national societies in a subject, such as the conferences held by the International Federation of Library Associations (IFLA).

Some are local, normally by state, province, or other local sections of a national body.

They are often held annually, or on some other recurring basis. Some of the largest societies hold more than one a year.

Others are held as a one time event, and are usually devoted to a specific topic.

== See also ==
- Academic conference
- Colloquium
- Congress
- Convention (meeting)
- Event Planning and Production
- Seminar
- Symposium
