= Igor Kusin =

Croatian linguist

Igor Kusin (born 27 June 1963 in Zagreb) is a linguist and author from Zagreb.

== Biography ==
Igor Kusin was born to a bilingual family on 27 June 1963. He finished his primary education at the Krajiška elementary school in Zagreb, where he proved to have talents for both languages and mathematics. He came first at the municipal mathematics competition for sixth form pupils. He graduated from the Mathematical-Informatical Grammar School (MIOC) in Zagreb. Afterwards he enrolled into the Faculty of Electrical Engineering of the University of Zagreb, but left it and worked on minor jobs for a decade. Unsatisfied with his working conditions, he enrolled into the University of Zagreb again, this time at the Faculty of Philosophy. There he graduated from general linguistics, which reconciled his passion for both mathematics and languages, as well as from comparative literature, with the thesis Indo-European sources of Old Irish Versification. He immediately enrolled into a post-graduate study at the same Faculty and at the moment is pursuing his PhD.

== Additional education ==
Igor Kusin attended other, extracurricular courses and classes.

He learned English, French, Italian and German at foreign language schools in Zagreb.

In the summer of 1995, he attended a fortnight course of (contemporary) Irish language organised by the Oidhreacht Chorca Dhuibhne in Ballyferriter in County Kerry, Ireland. In the summer of 1998, he attended the 4th Summer School of Comparative Celtic Linguistics and Medieval Irish Studies at the NUI Maynooth, in County Kildare, Ireland, and in autumn of the same year he attended the 2nd Seminar on Old Norse Mythology and Literature Myth and the Heroic Tradition in Old Norse Literature in Dubrovnik, Croatia.

== Hebrew language ==
After attending courses in Hebrew at both the Zagreb Jewish Community for two years and the Faculty of Philosophy for one year, Igor Kusin found both methods too slow, so in 1999 he decided to learn Hebrew in Israel, where he completed the second level (of six) at the Summer School of Hebrew at Tel-Aviv University, in Ramat-Aviv.

He compiled the etymology of words of Hebrew origin in Enciklopedijski rječnik hrvatskoga jezika (Encyclopaedic Dictionary of Croatian Language), that was first published in 2001 as a single volume, and then republished in twelve smaller volumes in 2004–05.

He started teaching his fellow linguistic students Hebrew for several years. In 2008 he began lecturing Introduction into Hebrew Language as a non-compulsory subject at the Faculty of Philosophy, as a part-time lecturer.

In 2013, he was employed at the Faculty of Philosophy as instructor (Croatian: "asistent"), teaching subjects on Hebrew language at the newly established Chair of Judaic Studies.

== Sign language ==
After attending a one-semestral course of Croatian Sign Language at the Faculty of Special Education and Rehabilitation of the University of Zagreb, he started and completed the two-year Croatian Sign Language course organised by the Croatian Association of Deafblind Persons Dodir.

In 2007 he held the lecture O nekim značajkama znakovnih jezika (s primjerima iz hrvatskog znakovnog jezika) (On Some Characteristics of Sign Languages (with Examples from Croatian Sign Language)) at the Zagreb Linguistic Circle. The same year and the following one he spoke about Govornici znakovnog jezika kao jezična i kulturna manjina (Sign Language Users as a Linguistic and Cultural Minority) at a series of round table discussions entitled Kroz toleranciju različitosti do razvoja zajednice (Towards the Development of the Community by Tolerating Diversity) in various cities in Croatia. In 2010 he held a lecture entitled Komunikacija s pacijentima govornicima znakovnog jezika (Communication with Sign Language Using Patients) at the 2nd Croatian Congress on Preventive Medicine and Health Promotion with international participation Equal in Health in Zagreb, Croatia.

He was one of the collaborators in the textbooks Znak po znak 2 – udžbenik za učenje hrvatskoga znakovnog jezika (Sign by Sign 2 – a Croatian Sign Language Textbook) and Znak po znak 3 – udžbenik za učenje hrvatskoga znakovnog jezika (Sign by Sign 3 – a Croatian Sign Language Textbook), published by the Croatian Association of Deafblind Persons Dodir in 2006 and 2007 respectively.

In 2008-2012 he was the editor of Dodir magazine (issues 34 through 46), the journal of the Croatian Association of Deafblind Persons Dodir. He also contributed articles for the magazine even before and after that period.

In 2012 he was approached by the Croatian Association of Deafblind Persons Dodir to write a foreword for a collection of poems by two Croatian deafblind poets, Željko Bosilj and Nikola Rundek. The collection, entitled Svjetlo i zvuk u našim su rukama (Light and Sound Are in Our Own Hands) was published in large-print and Braille simultaneously.

== Literary works ==
In 2000, he published a short story, entitled Trio za flautu, obou i fagot (Trio for Flute, Oboe and Bassoon) in the Republika literary magazine. Next year he self-published a small collection of lyrics, Floccōsae.

== Other works ==
In 2003, at the 17th conference of the Croatian Applied Linguistics Society Language in Social Interaction, he held a lecture with Zrinka Jelaska, PhD, Hrvatski idiomi u susretu s drugima, ali i sa samim sobom (Croatian Idioms in Contact), in Opatija, Croatia. The text of the lecture was published in 2005 as Usustavljivanje naziva (Systematisation of Terminology) in the volume Hrvatski kao drugi i strani jezik (Croatian as a Second and Foreign Language) edited and co-authored by Zrinka Jelaska.

In 2003, he also published the paper Autobiografije s Blasketa (Autobiographies from the Blasket Islands) in Književna smotra.

In 2011, he co-wrote the paper Sexual Revolution in Croatia, presented by Dr. Denisa Legac at the conference Sexual Revolution, held in Amsterdam, Netherlands.

Kusin signed the Declaration on the Common Language of the Croats, Serbs, Bosniaks and Montenegrins.
