= Book Talk =

Literature conference in Serbia

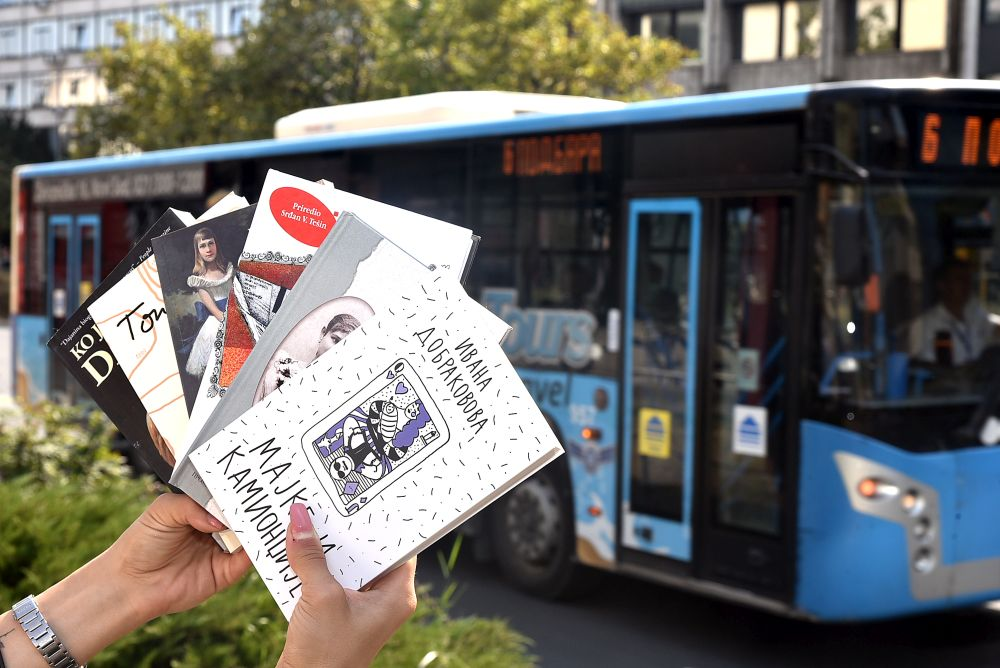
Book week

Book Talk is a literature conference organized by Color Media Communications in Serbia. The conference has been taking place since 2015 in Novi Sad, while in 2020, due to the coronavirus pandemic, the event was held in a hybrid format for the first time, with the audience watching the panel discussions online.

== About the conference ==
The Book Talk Conference is dedicated to writers, literary critics, publishers, celebrities and artists from all over the Balkan. The conference's location takes place in the Matica Srpska Gallery, the Pavle Beljanski Memorial Collection and other cultural institutions in Novi Sad.

=== Book Week ===
The Book Week campaign takes place every year before the conference, in cooperation with JGSP Novi Sad. During the campaign, volunteers donate books by various literary publishers to passengers in public buses or at bus stops in several locations in Novi Sad. The campaign's goal is to draw people's attention to the culture of reading and to motivate those who read to read even more.

=== Side events ===
"Walk&Talk: A Conversation with a Favourite Writer" is one of the side activities at the conference where the audience has the opportunity to walk the streets of Novi Sad in the company of a writer they choose by voting before the event. The writers Isidora Bjelica and in Dževad Karahasan were chosen in 2016 and 2017 respectively.

In 2018, a free guided tour called "Famous Writers of Novi Sad" was organized. The tour was dedicated to the famous people of Novi Sad, poets and writers who have left a mark on the history of Novi Sad, as well as on the city's culture in their historic books.

In September 2019, as part of the conference, the event called "Draško Ređep’s Dinner" was held, a culinary and literary homage to a writer and literary and art critic from Novi Sad, who died in January of the same year.

In 2020, amidst the coronavirus pandemic, only one panel discussion was held in the Archives of Vojvodina in Novi Sad, dedicated to the 90th anniversary of the birth of the writer Borislav Pekić. The audience was able to follow the panel online, via a live stream.

In 2021, the conference was dedicated to Ivo Andrić, to mark the 60th anniversary of the writer winning the Nobel Prize for Literature for his book "The Bridge on the Drina".
