= Boban Stojanović (activist) =

Serbian-Canadian activist

Boban Stojanović Бобан Стојановић
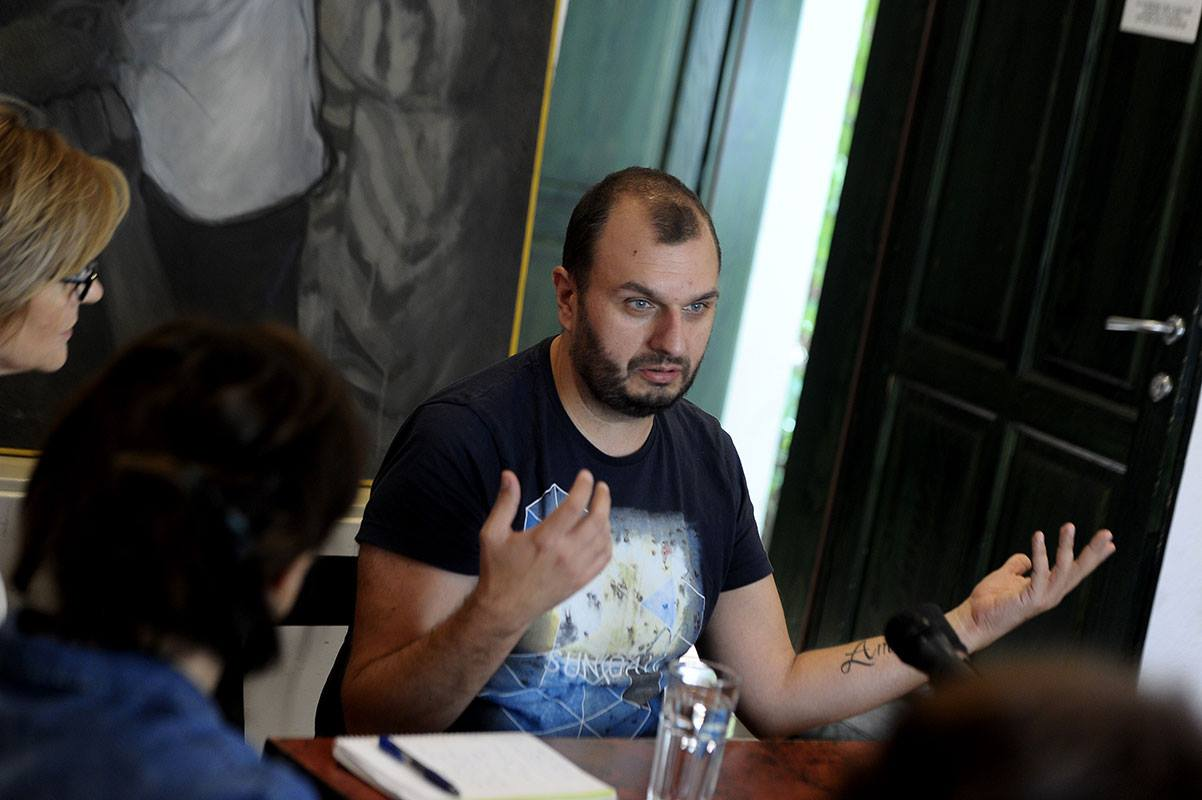
- Born: 1978 (age 47–48); Zaječar, Yugoslavia
- Occupation: LGBTQ activist

Boban Stojanović (Serbo-Croatian Cyrillic: Бобан Стојановић: born 1978) is a Serbian-Canadian peace and LGBTQ activist.

== Career ==
Born in Zaječar, Stojanović has campaigned for various social issues over the past twenty years. As a youth, he was involved with organizations countering violence against women. During the Yugoslav Wars, he refused to serve in the military and instead volunteered at various refugee centers. In 2005, he founded an organization promoting LGBTQ rights called the Queeria Centre. He was also involved in advancing the Serbian Anti-Discrimination Law, which was passed in 2009. In 2017, he signed the Declaration on the Common Language of the Croats, Serbs, Bosniaks and Montenegrins.

Stojanović was CEO and one of the founders of the Belgrade Pride Parade, which was held for the first time in 2001. He has spoken at various seminars concerning LGBT issues, as well as being a presenter at Tedx Belgrade. Since immigrating to Canada in 2016, he works at Calgary's "Center for Newcomers", helping new arrivals from the LGBT community. In 2017, Stojanović spoke at the Prairie and Northwest Territories LGBTQ+ Newcomers Settlement Conference. That same year, he also participated in the "Coming Out Monologues" performance held in Bow Valley.

== Honours and awards ==
In 2014, Stojanović had the honour of being an International Grand Marshall at the Montreal Pride Parade. In 2015, he received the "David Kato Vision and Voice Award" for being one of the top five gay activists in the world. He was also nominated twice for the Global Exchange People's Choice Awards.
