= Certified translation =

Production of translations that are acceptable by a legal jurisdiction

A certified translation renders the meaning of text into another language in accordance with the requirements of the target jurisdiction, enabling it to be used in formal procedures, with the translator accepting responsibility for its accuracy. These requirements vary widely from country to country. While some countries allow only state-appointed translators to produce such translations, others will accept those carried out by any competent bilingual individual. Between these two extremes are countries where a certified translation can be carried out by any professional translator with the correct credentials (which may include membership of specific translation associations or the holding of certain qualifications).

English speaking countries, such as the United Kingdom, the USA, Australia and New Zealand, fall on the more relaxed end of the spectrum, and simply require certified translations to include a statement made by the translator attesting to its accuracy, along with the date, the translator's credentials and contact details. This is the type of certification that is required by UK government bodies, such as the Home Office and the UK Border Agency, as well as by universities and most foreign embassies.

European countries other than the UK tend to have much stricter laws regarding who can produce a certified translation, with most appointing official certified translators based on them having obtained the local state-regulated qualification.

== Legal requirements ==
For legal and official purposes, evidentiary documents and other official documentation are usually required in the official language(s) of a jurisdiction.

In some countries, it is a requirement for translations of such documents that a translator swear an oath to attest that it is the legal equivalent of the source text. Often, only translators of a special class are authorized to swear such oaths. In some cases, the translation is accepted as a legal equivalent only if it is accompanied by the original or a sworn or certified copy of it.

Even if a translator specializes in legal translation or is a lawyer in their country, this does not necessarily make them a sworn translator. The procedure for translating to legal equivalence differs from country to country.

=== Argentina ===
In compliance with local laws, all documents written in languages other than Spanish have to be translated into Spanish by a certified licensed translator, pursuant to local laws. Generally speaking, all documents to be submitted before official authorities (including personal papers and some commercial contracts) have to be translated and signed by a certified translator ("traductor público"), whose stamp and signature have to be legalized by the relevant professional association that issued the translator's license. All private persons, companies, the judiciary, and other government departments are subject to various laws regarding documents or depositions in a foreign language, such as the relevant regulations of the Argentine Civil and Commercial Code, the Argentine Codes of Civil and Criminal Procedure, among others. In order to be certified as a "traductor público", candidates have to attend university courses leading to the professional degree of "traductor público" / "traductora pública".

=== Austria ===
Pursuant to section 14 of the Sworn and Certified Experts, Interpreters and Translators Act #137/1995 (SDG) as amended, regional courts are entitled to appoint sworn translators for translations between German and any language (including sign language), who have sworn an oath at court after having passed an official exam. To be admitted to the exam, candidates must present evidence of at least 5 years of professional experience as a translator or interpreter or of at least 2 years of professional experience if they have graduated in translation studies at a university. Although mostly referred to as "Gerichtsdolmetscher", the correct name of their status is "allgemein beeidete/r und gerichtlich zertifizierte/r Dolmetscher/in". Sworn translators are entitled to create public instruments by signing and sealing of translations attached to originals. No further notarization of their signature on translations is needed, and sworn translators can apply at court for the adding of an apostille. Police are advised to involve sworn interpreters to overcome language barriers whenever this is possible. Most public authorities in Austria accept translations of documents as legally equivalent only when sealed and signed by a sworn interpreter for the given language. The authorization will lapse if a sworn interpreter will not attend regular professional training.

=== Belgium ===
"Sworn Translators" (singular Dutch: beëdigd vertaler, French: traducteur assermenté) or "Sworn Interpreter" (singular Dutch: beëdigd tolk, French: interprète assermenté) swear an oath before the president of the tribunal of the first instance of the judicial district in which they have their place of residence. In the past translators and interpreters in all judicial districts aspiring to "sworn" status were screened for suitability by the Crown Prosecutor. The candidate has to state the language combinations for he or she wishes to be sworn. A diploma of translator/interpreter is usually regarded as adequate proof of competence. There is no limitation on the language combinations which can be recognized.

However, following a scandal involving an illegal immigrant who obtained sworn translator status, The president of the tribunal of the first instance at Antwerp, launched an experimental scheme whereby aspiring sworn translators and interpreters have to undergo training organized by the Ministry of Justice and submit to examination. The same president, based on his interpretation of the language laws, also ruled that the only language combinations that could be recognized for a sworn translator/interpreter status were those in which Dutch was either the original language or the target language. This view has not yet been adopted by other judicial districts in Belgium.

=== Brazil ===
Official documents can only be translated by Public Sworn Translators and Interpreters, who are certified and accredited by the registry of commerce of each state. The applicants must pass highly demanding oral and written examinations for specific language pairs. They undergo background checks before receiving a registration number, which must be informed in the heading of every translation. Ad hoc (temporary) translators can also be appointed by the Registry of Commerce to do a single translation job when there is no Public Translator registered for that specific language pair. The registry of commerce of each state also sets the translation fees.

Although the public sworn translator/interpreter must reside in the state of registration, his translations are valid in the entire country. Institutions and government agencies in cities and states different from those of residence of the public sworn translator may require the notarial verification of the translator's signature.

Foreign documents must be verified by a Brazilian consulate or embassy in the country they were issued before translation. Official documents translated into a foreign language need to have the public sworn translator's signature verified by the Brazilian Ministry of Foreign Affairs if the institution or government agency of the foreign country so requires.

=== Canada ===
Official translation of documents can be produced in one of two ways. Certified translations are those completed by a certified translator and accompanied by the translator's declaration, signature, and seal. The title of "certified translator" is a protected title in Canada, and only those individuals who are members in good standing of a provincial translators' association and have passed a certification exam can use this title and produce certified translations. An alternative method for producing official translations in Canada is by attaching a sworn affidavit signed by the translator in the presence of a notary public or commissioner for taking affidavits to the translation.

=== Germany ===
German regional courts (Landgerichte) have the power to appoint "sworn translators". The specific title and the appointment procedure are different in each state. In most cases, the candidates are required to pass an examination. Germany maintains an official database online at www.justiz-uebersetzer.de that lists all translators sworn-in in all federal states.

=== Hungary ===
There are five qualification types for translators and interpreters in Hungary: technical translator, technical translator-proofreader, interpreter, technical interpreter, and conference interpreter. These qualifications can be acquired in BA and MA programs, postgraduate courses, and in institutions accredited by the Ministry of Public Administration and Justice.

Anyone regardless of age and qualification may apply for a qualifying examination in interpretation. Qualifications for technical translation, technical translation proofreading, technical interpretation, and conference interpretation can be obtained in the following fields: social science, natural science, technology, and economics. Anyone with a degree in one of the above fields may apply for a qualifying examination in technical translation and technical interpretation in the given field. Qualified technical interpreters and technical translators may be further qualified for conference interpretation and technical translation proofreading, respectively.

The National Office for Translation and Attestation (Országos Fordító és Fordításhitelesítő Iroda, OFFI) is a company in Hungary that has the exclusive right to certify translations both from and to Hungarian created by the office itself or a third party, and to make certified copies of documents written in a foreign language. Interpretation in courts of Budapest is provided by OFFI.

If the Office cannot provide an interpreter, and for courts outside Budapest, an interpreter registered by the local authorities will be appointed. If no official interpreter is available, a suitable person with a good command of the required language will be appointed.

=== India ===
There are less documentation and sources known. A sworn-in Interpreter or Translator as per Maharashtra Courts Civil Law Chapter 26 of OATHS AND AFFIDAVITS prescribed under section 6 of the Oaths Act, 1969 (point 515) may with help of Form No.3 make an affidavit that he shall well and truly interpret pieces of evidence given by witnesses and translate correctly and accurately all documents given to him or her for translation.

=== Indonesia ===
In Indonesia, sworn translators are persons having attended and passed legal translation examinations organized by the School of Linguistics and Cultural Sciences, University of Indonesia (FIB, UI). After passing the exam, they will be sworn in by the governor of DKI Jakarta, provided that they have a Jakarta ID card. For other regions, each has to write to their respective governor to take an oath by their governor, thus obtain the status 'sworn'.

Alternatively, the Association of Indonesian Translators or HPI also has exams for members who want to have a certification as a competent, professional translator or interpreter. Upon passing, the certification will expire in 5 years.

=== Italy ===
Both Italian courts and consulates have the power to appoint as "official translators" (traduttori giurati or ufficiali) candidates who pass an examination or show proof of language proficiency (usually a university degree).

=== Mexico ===
In Mexico, certified translation is known as a translation that is sealed and signed by a government-authorized expert translator (Perito traductor autorizado), these expert translators are commonly authorized by each state's Court of Justice, or by the Federal Judicial Council, but local government offices can also give out such authorizations in certain cases (E.g. Civil Registry offices in Guanajuato and Jalisco). The authorization procedure are different in each state, and in most cases the candidates are required to pass an examination. There is no additional requirement in order to attest for the authenticity of the translation.

=== Netherlands ===
The Bureau for Sworn Interpreters and Translators, a department of the Dutch Legal Aid Council that has been entrusted by the Ministry of Justice with various implementation tasks in respect of the Sworn Interpreters and Translators Act. They have two levels of accreditation however only the highest level has legal validity.

=== Norway ===
Candidates are certified by the Association of Government Authorized Translators, after they pass a very demanding examination. Successful candidates are then authorized by the Norwegian government to sign their translations, after the phrase "True Translation Certified." The association was founded in 1913.

=== Poland ===
The standards of translation in Poland are regulated by a relevant department of the Ministry of Justice, and every translator wishing to provide such services must pass a state examination. Afterward such a person is entered on an official list, issued with a stamp, and recognized as a sworn translator. However, for ordinary translations (business, administration, correspondence) it is enough to have an independent expert in the field.

=== South Africa ===
In South Africa, the translator must be authorized by the High Court and must use an original (or a sworn copy of an original) in his physical presence as his source text. The translator may only swear by his own translation. There is no requirement for an additional witness (such as a notary) to attest to the authenticity of the translation.

=== Spain ===
In Spain, a sworn translation is a translation by a translator appointed by the Spanish Ministry of Foreign Affairs, European Union and Cooperation. To become a sworn translator in Spain for a combination of Castilian and another language, the candidate has to be certified by the Ministry of Foreign Affairs and Cooperation as a "sworn translator and interpreter" (traductor-intérprete jurado). Then, the translator is required to register their stamp and signature with the Ministry, who includes the translator's data in a public list of sworn interpreters.

Sworn translators are professional translators (normally individuals who hold a degree in translation and interpretation) who have passed an exam given by the Spanish Ministry of Foreign Affairs and Cooperation and are therefore authorized to translate from Spanish into another language and vice versa. Eligibility can be achieved either through a state exam or by completing the degree studies of Translation and Interpretation in a Spanish University, provided that the translator has passed certain law-related subjects.

Sworn translators for combinations including the other three co-official languages of Spain (Basque, Catalan and Galician) are certified by regional authorities following a similar procedure as the Spanish Ministry of Foreign Affairs.

As a rule, all documents submitted in Spain must be translated by a translator certified by the Spanish Ministry of Foreign Affairs and Cooperation; however, in many cases, documents translated internationally and submitted to various consulates and embassies can be translated within the respective country by translators certified within the country of submission. In other words, a certified translator in the United States is able to translate documents for one of the Spanish Consulates located in the United States, but not if the documents are to be presented in Spain.

=== Sweden ===
The Legal, Financial and Administrative Services Agency is an official agency that authorizes interpreters and translators, who must pass a stringent examination arranged by the organization. Authorized translators hold a protected professional title, and their translations are considered legal and binding for all legal purposes.

=== United Kingdom ===
In the UK, a certified translation is simply one which comes with a statement made by the translator or translation agency guaranteeing its accuracy, along with the date, the translator's credentials, and contact details. They are often signed and stamped and should be proofread for an added guarantee of accuracy. This is the type of certification that is required by UK government bodies such as the Home Office, Passport Office, and the UK Border Agency, as well as by universities and most foreign embassies in the UK. A certified translation guarantees its accuracy and contains the name and contact number of the translator or project manager, who can vouch for that accuracy and may be contacted by the requesting organization in order to do so.

=== United States ===
A certified translation consists of the source-language text, the target-language text, and a statement signed by the translator or translation company representative that the translator or translation company representative believes the target-language text to be an accurate and complete translation of the source-language text. The signature must be notarized. There is no federal or state licensing or certification for translators. There are some credentials available to translators but they do not carry the same weight as federal licensing or certification in other countries.

=== United Arab Emirates ===
In the United Arab Emirates (UAE), a certified translation is synonymous with legal translation. legal Translation can be only done by a Ministry of Justice of UAE licensed translator. Every translator has to qualify in the examination held by the Ministry of Justice, UAE for each language pair. A language pair consists of Arabic & a Foreign language. There are legal translators for only 9 foreign languages available in the United Arab Emirates viz. English, French, German, Spanish, Italian, Russian, Chinese, Persian, and Turkish. Only legal translations can be notarized, attested, & legalized from the Notary Public of UAE, Ministry of Justice of UAE, the Ministry of Foreign Affairs & International Co-operation, UAE. All Embassies & Consulates located in the United Arab Emirates legalize only legal translations attested by the Ministry of Foreign Affairs & International Co-operation, UAE. For legal translations to be legalized from the Ministry of Foreign Affairs & International Co-operation, UAE it must be at first legalized from the Ministry of Justice of UAE or Notary Public of the UAE. The Ministry of Justice of UAE legalizes only translations made by their licensed translators.

== See also ==
- Translation
- Legal translation
