= Igor Štiks =

Bosnian and Herzegovinian academic and writer (1977)

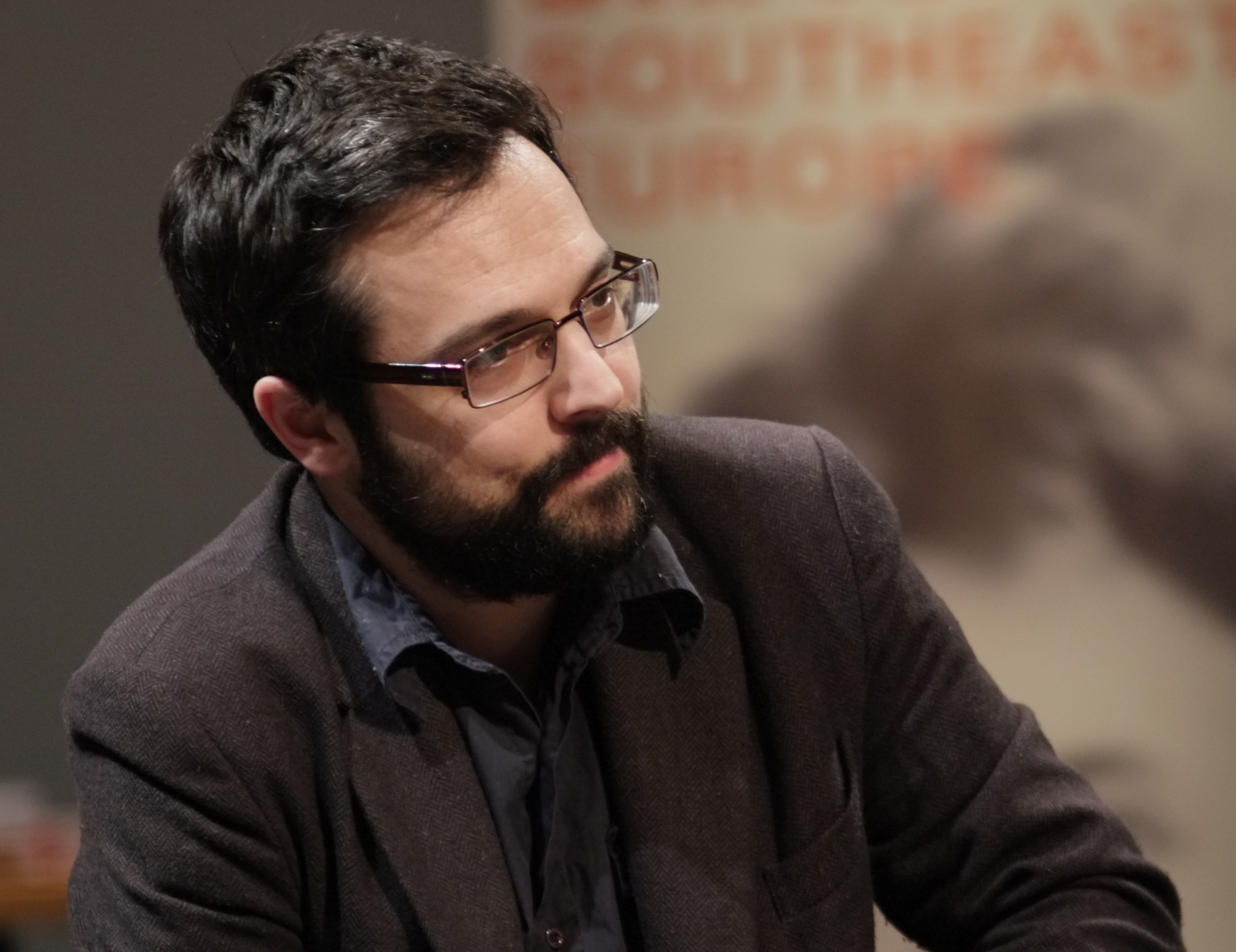
- Igor Štiks in 2017
- Born: 17 September 1977 (age 48); Sarajevo, SR Bosnia and Herzegovina, Yugoslavia
- Education: Institut d’Études Politiques de Paris; Northwestern University
- Occupations: Writer, academic
- Spouse: Jelena Vasiljevic
- Writing career
- Period: 2000–present
- Notable awards: Ordre des Arts et des Lettres

Igor Štiks (born 17 September 1977) is a Bosnian and Croatian novelist and political philosopher. As an academic, Štiks works as a research associate at the University of Edinburgh. His novels The Judgment of Richard Richter and A Castle in Romagna have earned him multiple awards; the former has been translated into 15 languages.

== Biography ==
Igor Štiks was born in Sarajevo, Bosnia-Herzegovina, in 1977. During the Yugoslav wars he fled to Croatia and currently lives in Belgrade, Serbia. He has also lived in Paris, Chicago, Edinburgh, and Graz.

He earned his PhD at the Institut d’Études Politiques de Paris and Northwestern University and later worked and taught at the University of Edinburgh and the Faculty of Media and Communications in Belgrade.

His first novel, A Castle in Romagna (Dvorac u Romagni), won the Slavić prize for best first novel in Croatia and was nominated for the IMPAC International Dublin Literary Award for 2006. His second novel The Judgment of Richard Richter, originally published as Elijah's Chair (Elijahova stolica), won the Gjalski and Kiklop Awards for the best novel in Croatia in 2006 and has been translated into fifteen languages including German, Spanish, French, Dutch, Italian, Polish, Czech, Hungarian, Slovenian, Bulgarian, Macedonian, Finnish, Ukrainian and Arabic. In 2017 he published his third novel originally titled Rezalište.

In his scholarly work, Štiks investigated the topic of citizenship and nationalism in Yugoslavia and the Balkans. Besides many scholarly articles and edited volumes, Štiks published a monograph, Nations and Citizens in Yugoslavia and the Post-Yugoslav States: One Hundred Years of Citizenship (2015). Along with Jo Shaw, he edited the collections Citizenship after Yugoslavia (2013) and Citizenship Rights (2013), and, with Srećko Horvat, Welcome to the Desert of Post-Socialism (2015). Štiks was honored with the prestigious French distinction Chevalier des arts et des lettres for his literary and intellectual achievements.

In addition to winning the Grand Prix of the 2011 Belgrade International Theater Festival for his stage adaptation of Elijah's Chair, Štiks wrote two more plays, Flour in the Veins and Zrenjanin. All three plays were put on stage by one of the leading post-Yugoslav theater directors Boris Liješević.

In 2017, Štiks signed the Declaration on the Common Language of the Croats, Serbs, Bosniaks and Montenegrins.

== Personal life ==
Štiks is married to Dr. Jelena Vasiljevic, who is a research associate at the Institute for Philosophy and Social Theory at University of Belgrade. They live in Belgrade and have a son.

== Bibliography ==
=== Novels ===
- The Cuts, (Rezalište), Fraktura Publishing, Zagreb, 2017.
- The Judgment of Richard Richter, originally published as Elijah's Chair (Elijahova stolica ), translated by Ellen Elias Bursac, AmazonCrossing, US, September 2017.
- A Castle in Romagna, (Dvorac u Romagni), translated by Russell Valentino and Tomislav Kuzmanovic, AmazonCrossing, US, March 2018.

=== Theatre ===
- Flour in the Veins (Brašno u venama), play, bilingual edition, translated into English by Andrew B. Wachtel, Fraktura, Zagreb, 2016.

=== Poetry ===
- History of a Flood (Povijest poplave), Fraktura, Zagreb, 2008.

=== Scholarship / Non-fiction (author) ===
- The Right to Rebellion: An Introduction to Anatomy of Civic Resistance (Pravo na pobunu: uvod u anatomiju gradjanske pobune ), with Srećko Horvat, Fraktura, Zagreb, 2010
- Nations and Citizens in Yugoslavia and the Post-Yugoslav States: One Hundred Years of Citizenship, London: Bloomsbury Publishing, 2015.

=== Scholarship / Non-fiction (editor) ===
- Citizenship after Yugoslavia, with Jo Shaw, Abingdon: Routledge, 2013.
- Citizenship Rights, with Jo Shaw, Farnham and London: Ashgate, 2013.
- Welcome to the Desert of Post-Socialism: Radical Politics after Yugoslavia, with Srećko Horvat, London: Verso, 2015.

=== Fiction (editor) ===
- The Eight Ocular, selected stories by Goran Tribuson (Osmi okular: izabrane priče Gorana Tribusona), edited by Igor Štiks, Ceres, Zagreb, 1998.
- 22 in the Shadow: An Anthology of New Croatian Fiction (22 u hladu: antologija nove hrvatske proze 90ih), edited by Igor Štiks and Dalibor Šimpraga, Celeber, Zagreb, 1999.
- The Ultimate Safari through the Empire of English Language (Vrhunski safari kroz carstvo engleskog jezika), edited by Igor Štiks and Dragan Koruga, Naklada MD, Zagreb, 2001.
- New European Poets, edited by Wayne Miller and Kevin Prufer, editor for Croatia, Serbia, Montenegro, and Bosnia-Herzegovina, Graywolf Press, US, 2008.
