= Open University of Sarajevo =

- Otvoreni univerzitet Sarajevo – Отворени универзитет Сарајево
- OUS Logo
- Established: 2013
- Location: Sarajevo, Bosnia and Herzegovina; 43°52′N 18°25′E
- Website: Official website

The Open University of Sarajevo, (Bosnian: Otvoreni univerzitet Sarajevo / Отворени универзитет Сарајево) was a non-profit experimental platform for interactive education, social activism, and public debate. Themes that the school has dealt with include Neo-Marxism, Yugoslavism, Third wave feminism, Post-Colonialism, Historical revisionism, Post-fascism, social constructionism, revolutionary democracy, linguistic nationalism and philosophy of existence. The Open University of Sarajevo was an outspoken advocate of protests in Bosnia and Herzegovina in 2013 and 2014, and called for the continuation of direct democracy that was established by plenums The school runs a Free-to-view platform that streams all of its content online, dubbed in various languages. It archives it on its website and YouTube channel. The organizers disagreed with the term school, preferring to use the term platform.

== History ==
The Open University (Otvoreni univerzitet) of Sarajevo was founded in December 2013 by a group of friends in Sarajevo, including academic and writer Igor Štiks, scholar and journalist Nidžara Ahmetašević, and academic Dino Abazović.

The second edition was held in Sarajevo, in the History Museum, in March 2014, during the massive social protests in the country. The idea was to create an open and safe space for those who participated in the protests and those who wanted to discuss what was happening. Previously, the group issued a public statement supporting ongoing protests.

The second one, which lasted four days, was organized in November of the same year in SARTR. Besides panels and discussions, Otvoreni Univerzitet organised a photo exhibition and promoted online publication BUNT with photos from the protests made by Sarajevo based photographer Velija Hasanbegović.

After Sarajevo, Otvoreni univerzitet held one session in Banja Luka in 2015. The last Otvoreni univerzitet, sixth, was held in Sarajevo, in Sartr, in November 2017.

In this short period, Otvoreni univerzitet managed to become a space for discussions, meetings, and the exchange of ideas between public figures, intellectuals, artists, and people in Sarajevo, whether locals or visitors.

== Format and venues ==
Each year's program was formed around a particular questions such as What are we afraid of?, subsequently forming topics based on said statement (Why are we afraid of...Yugoslavism?; Why are we afraid of...Marxism?; Why are we afraid of...immigrants? etc.) Another major aspect of the school's format was the fact that it did not require enrollment or any form of participant registration, instead opting for a grassroots and plenum format.
