= Ilija Vojinović =

Serbian politician

Ilija Vojinović (Serbian Cyrillic: Илија Војиновић; born 5 August 1953) is a politician in Serbia. He was the mayor of Kikinda from 2009 to 2012 and served two terms in the Assembly of Vojvodina. Vojinović is a member of the Democratic Party (Demokratska stranka, DS).

== Early life and private career ==
Vojinović was born in the village of Nakovo in Kikinda, Autonomous Province of Vojvodina, in what was then the People's Republic of Serbia in the Federal People's Republic of Yugoslavia. He graduated from the Faculty of Pedagogy and Technology in Zrenjanin and later worked as a professor and director at the technical high school in Kikinda. He was at different times the director of JKP "6.Oktobar" Kikinda and the acting director of JP "Autoprevoz" Kikinda.

== Politician ==
=== Local politics ===
Vojinović served two terms in the Kikinda municipal assembly before becoming mayor. From 1996 to 1999, during Paja Francuski's mayoralty, he was the president of the municipal assembly's executive board (i.e., effectively the municipality's first minister).

He was given the twelfth position on the DS's For a European Kikinda electoral list for the 2008 Serbian local elections. The list won fourteen mandates, and he was not initially included in his party's assembly delegation. (For this election cycle, all mandates were assigned to candidates on successful lists at the discretion of the sponsoring parties or coalitions, irrespective of numerical order.) The Serbian Radical Party (Srpska radikalna stranka, SRS) won a plurality victory and initially formed government under incumbent mayor Branislav Blažić. In October 2008, shifting political alliances brought the DS to power with Jagoda Tolicki succeeding Blažić in the mayor's office.

Tolicki later lost the support of many in her party and was removed as mayor. Vojinović was given a local assembly mandate on 17 June 2009 and, at the same session, was selected as Tolicki's replacement. He served in this role for the next three years. In late 2009, he started the process of having Kikinda formally designated as a city. Toward the end of his term, he apologized to Serbian human rights activist Nataša Kandić for a prior government's designation of her as persona non grata in Kikinda.

Serbia's electoral system was reformed in 2011, such that mandates in elections held under proportional representation were awarded to candidates on successful lists in numerical order. Vojinović appeared in the second position on the DS's list for Kikinda in the 2012 local elections and was re-elected when the list won eleven mandates. The DS again formed a local coalition government following the election; Vojinović, who was also elected to the provincial assembly and could not hold a dual mandate as mayor, he stood down from this role and was replaced by fellow DS member Savo Dobranić. The following year, the Democrats fell from power and a new local government was formed by the Serbian Progressive Party (Srpska napredna stranka, SNS).

Vojinović served as president of the DS municipal board after the 2012 election. The party was divided between two rival factions in this period, and opposition to Vojinović became particularly strong after the Progressives came to power. He was ultimately removed in late 2013. The party's board group in the local assembly eventually dissolved, and all of its members (including Vojinović) nominally served as independents. He did not seek re-election at the local level in 2016.

=== Provincial politics ===
The DS contested 2000 Vojvodina provincial election as part of the Democratic Opposition of Serbia (Demokratska opozicija Srbije, DOS), a broad and ideologically diverse coalition of parties opposed to Slobodan Milošević's administration. The DOS won a landslide victory in the election, and Vojinović, who was elected for Kikinda's first division, served with the government's majority. He was a member of the assembly's budget and finance committee and the committee on urbanism, spatial planning, and environmental protection.

Vojvodina adopted a system of mixed proportional representation for the 2004 provincial election. Vojinović appeared in the thirteenth position on the DS's electoral list; the list won fifteen mandates and was not selected for a mandate afterward. (As in the 2008 local elections, Vojinović's specific list on the list had no formal bearing on his chances of election.) He was not a candidate in 2008 but was again elected for Kikinda's first division in the 2012 provincial election. The DS and its allies won a strong plurality victory in this cycle, and Vojinović again served as a government supporter for the next four years.

For the 2016 provincial election, Vojvodina moved to a system of full proportional representation. Vojinović was given the sixty-fourth position on the DS's coalition list and was not re-elected when the list won only ten mandates.

== Electoral record ==
=== Provincial (Vojvodina) ===
2012 Vojvodina assembly election Kikinda I (constituency seat) - First and Second Rounds
Ilija Vojinović	Coalition: Choice for a Better Vojvodina–Bojan Pajtić (Affiliation: Democratic Party)	2,513	17.66	6,013	50.65
Stanislava Hrnjak	Let's Get Vojvodina Moving–Tomislav Nikolić (Serbian Progressive Party, New Serbia, Movement of Socialists, Strength of Serbia Movement) (Affiliation: Serbian Progressive Party)	2,989	21.00	5,859	49.35
Stevan Grbić	Socialist Party of Serbia (SPS), Party of United Pensioners of Serbia (PUPS), United Serbia (JS), and Social Democratic Party of Serbia (SDP Serbia)	1,972	13.86		
Goran Dumitrov "Data"	U-Turn	1,947	13.68		
Milan Mitrić	League of Social Democrats of Vojvodina–Nenad Čanak	1,508	10.60		
Imre Kabok	Alliance of Vojvodina Hungarians	960	6.75		
Vladimir Pudar	Democratic Party of Serbia	857	6.02		
Neca Bajšanski	Citizens' Group: Strength of Kikinda	784	5.51		
Želimir Bajić	United Regions of Serbia–Karolj Damjanov	701	4.93		
Total valid votes		14,231	100	11,872	100

2000 Vojvodina assembly election Kikinda I (constituency seat)
Candidate	Party or Coalition	Result
Ilija Vojinović	Democratic Opposition of Serbia (Affiliation: Democratic Party)	elected
Branko Prolić	Serbian Radical Party	
other candidates		
