= Lazar Stojanović =

Serbian activist and director

Lazar Stojanović (1 March 1944 – 4 March 2017) was a director, journalist, intellectual, anti-war activist and one of the most prominent cultural dissidents of socialist Yugoslavia. His movie Plastic Jesus (1971) was banned in SFR Yugoslavia for eighteen years (1972–1990) and has caused Stojanović several years of imprisonment. After the collapse of Yugoslavia, during Slobodan Milošević’s regime in the 1990s, Stojanović was a journalist, theatre and documentary film director and anti-war activist.

== Early life ==
Belgrade-born Lazar Stojanović became politically active in the early 1960s, and in 1966, he joined the Yugoslav Communist Party from which he was excluded in 1972. Both Lazar and his brother, the philosopher Vojislav Stojanović, were active in the Yugoslav student movement. Lazar was one of the leaders of the organizational board at the Academy during the student protests in 1968. In parallel with studying at the Academy for Film, Theatre, Radio and television, he studied Psychology at the Faculty of Philosophy in Belgrade. During this period, he was both an author for and later editor of student magazines "Student" [The Student] and "Vidici" [The Views] (1968–1971). While he was the editor of "Student", Lazar Stojanović published a satirical critique on the Yugoslav political detention camp "Goli otok." In 1971, this time while being editor of "The Views", he dedicated one issue to the political, legal and press systems of the Third Reich drawing parallels with the Yugoslav communist regime. The authorities instantly banned his issue of "The Views," while Stojanović was arrested. In the end, however, he was not put on trial.

== Cultural opposition through film ==
Lazar Stojanović is usually considered a representative of the second generation of directors of the so-called "Black wave", an art movement that emerged within the so-called "New Yugoslav Film" (1961–72). The "Black Wave" movies were mostly dealing with marginalized individuals and groups, questioning the socialist revolution and personal freedom, as well as freedom of expression in socialism.

Plastic Jesus was filmed in 1971 as Stojanović's graduate final project at the academy. Seemingly, the movie has a simple plot dealing with the character of a strayed director (Tom Gotovac) who attempts to make a movie while living at the expenses of his lovers. However, the movie represents a scathing attack on almost all taboos of the time – from political to sexual. For the Yugoslav censors the way in which the figure of the former president Josip Broz Tito was used in the movie represented an open attack on the image and work of the president of the state, but also an assault on the whole system as such.

The film received the attention of censorship in 1972 and was banned even before any public screening, while the author was brought to trial. The movie remained banned until 1990 in Yugoslavia, and was eventually screened in Belgrade being on the regular repertoire for four months. In 1991, the movie got the FIPRESCI award at the film festival in Montreal. Further on, the author screened the movie several times on foreign, mostly American universities (Columbia University and Stanford), where he also has held lectures. In April 2016, Plastic Jesus was shown in the famous MoMA museum for seven days. For this occasion, the Yugoslav Film Archive produced a remastered version in which a censored scene was reintegrated.

== Imprisonment ==
Although Plastic Jesus was never screened publicly during Tito’s reign, it was produced at a time in which Party-infighting was calling the Yugoslav regime into question, causing also suppression of artistic freedom. Therefore, Stojanović’s trial and prosecution of his film were used as warnings to other potentially critical artists. Stojanović spent three years in prison, between 1972 and 1975. He was accused and convicted of the criminal offense of hostile propaganda.

After serving his sentence, his passport was withhold. In 1976, Stojanović took part in the creation of the “Open university", along with his brother Vojislav. The "Open University" was a specific form of intellectual oppositional activity, modeled after similar concepts in Czechoslovakia and Poland, and organized as gatherings in private apartments with discussions regarding different topics, including political issues, discussions of historical, philosophical and topics on science. A police raid in a private apartment in 1984 marked the end of the "Open university." On that occasion, Lazar Stojanović was also arrested; yet, he was released a few days later without charges being filed.

== Exile and anti-war activism ==
In 1978, because of international pressure Stojanović and several other artists got their passports returned. He seized this opportunity to leave the country and spent the following years in London, Afghanistan, India and Iraq, with several shorter stays in Belgrade.

Mid 1980s, Stojanović returned to Yugoslavia and worked as a director in a theatre. He was one of the founders of "The Time" [VREME] magazine for which he also wrote as a journalist. From the beginning of the 1990s, he was an anti-war activist. He worked as journalist for "Ship" [Brod] radio, and later as a freelancer for "Radio France Internationale." In 1994, he left the country and moved to New York City. In the US, he worked as a translator and was a guest lecturer at several American universities. After the conflict in Kosovo at the end of the 1990s, Stojanović worked for the OSCE and UN missions from 2000 until 2006. During this period he also shot several documentaries about Serbian war crimes and war criminals. Lazar Stojanović returned to Serbia in 2011 and worked for the Humanitarian Law Center as Coordinator of the Public Campaign for the Regional Truth Commission project (RECOM).

Until his death on 4 March 2017, he lived and worked in Belgrade. Lazar Stojanović was constant in his dissent from any regime suppressing individual freedom.

== Filmography ==
| Year | Title | Serbian Title | Notes |
|---|---|---|---|
| | The Healthy Offspring | Zdrav podmladak | |
| 1968 | She loves | Ona voli | |
| 1971 | Plastic Jesus | Plastični Isus | |
| 1993 | Serbian epic | Srpska epika | |
| 1995 | The Scorpions, A Home Movie | Škorpioni, kućni film | |
| 1997 | Almost Serbs | Približno Srbi | |
| 2005 | The rise and fall of general Mladić | Uspon i pad generala Mladića | |
| 2005 | The life and adventures of Radovan Karadžić | Život i priključenje Radovana Karadžića | |

== Weblinks and further literature ==
- Ćirić, Sonja, 2016. "Intervju – Lazar Stojanović, Reditelj: NATO Nema Alternativu." Nedeljnik Vreme, 11 February. Retrieved 14 March 2017. http://www.vreme.com/cms/view.php?id=1366268&print=yes.
- DeCuir, Greg et al. 2011b. Yugoslav black wave: Polemical Cinema from 1963 to 1973 in the Socialist Federal Republic of Yugoslavia. Belgrade: Film Center Serbia.
- Levi, Pavle. 2007. Disintegration in frames: Aesthetics and ideology in the Yugoslav and post-Yugoslav cinema. Stanford (Calif.): Stanford University Press.
- Pantić, A. (13 June 2015). "Lazar Stojanović: Svako Sam Odlučuje Kad će Da Bude Hrabar". 24sata. Archived from the original on 15 June 2015.
- Solomun, Zoran. 2012. Tito und die jugoslawischen Achtungsechziger.” Deutschlandfunk, 7 February. Retrieved 2 February 2017. http://www.deutschlandfunk.de/plastic-jesus-tito-und-die-jugoslawischen-achtundsechziger.media.5b54c319d7e32feaba15a76a5d081d3b.pdf
- Vučetić, Radina, 2016. Monopol na istinu. Beograd: Clio.
- Kanzleiter, Boris, 2011. Rote Universität": Studentenbewegung und Linksopposition in Belgrad 1964–1975. Hamburg: VSA.
