= Initiative for RECOM =

Post-Yugoslav non-governmental network

- Formation: May 2006; 19 years ago
- Headquarters: Belgrade, Serbia
- Region served: Bosnia and Herzegovina; Croatia; North Macedonia; Montenegro; Serbia; Slovenia; Kosovo
- Services: Transitional justice
- Coordinator: Nataša Kandić
- Website: www.recom.link

The Initiative for RECOM (Albanian: Nisma për KOMRA; Bosnian/ Croatian: Inicijativa za REKOM; English: Initiative for RECOM; Macedonian/ Serbian: Иницијатива за РЕКОМ; Slovene: Pobuda za REKOM), full name Initiative for the establishment of a Regional Commission tasked with establishing the facts about all victims of war crimes and other serious human rights violations committed on the territory of the former Socialist Federal Republic of Yugoslavia in the period from January 1, 1991, to December 31, 2001, was an initiative to establish a regional commission for truth by agreement between the states of the former Socialist Federal Republic of Yugoslavia.

The Initiative for RECOM is represented in public through the RECOM Reconciliation Network (until 2019, Coalition for RECOM), which is the largest network of non-governmental organizations (more than 2,200 members) in the countries of the former SFR Yugoslavia. In 2019, RECOM Reconciliation Network gave up further insistence on the successor states of the SFR Yugoslavia to establish an intergovernmental commission. On that occasion, it took care and responsibility to make a list of victims of the wars caused by the disintegration of SFR Yugoslavia. The coordinator of the RECOM Reconciliation Network is Nataša Kandić.

== History ==
The Regional commission for establishing the facts about war crimes and other serious violations of human rights committed on the territory of the former SFR Yugoslavia from January 1, 1991, to December 31, 2001 (RECOM) was supposed to be an official, interstate commission that was to be jointly established by the successors of the former SFR Yugoslavia. As an extrajudicial body, RECOM should have been tasked with establishing the facts of all war crimes and other serious violations of human rights related to the war; to list all war-related victims by name and determine the circumstances of their death; to collect data on places of detention, on persons who are illegally detained, subjected to torture and inhumane treatment, as well as to make a comprehensive list of them; to collect information about the fate of the missing, as well as to hold public hearings of victims and other persons about wrongdoings related to the war. The regional commission was supposed to be independent of its founders and to be financed by donations.

The process surrounding the establishment of RECOM began with a debate on instruments for discovering and telling facts about the past in May 2006 at the 1st Regional forum for transitional justice in post-Yugoslav countries, which was held in Sarajevo and was organized by the Humanitarian Law Center from Belgrade, Research and Documentation Center from Sarajevo and Documenta – Center for Dealing with the Past from Zagreb. The participants, representatives of around 300 non-governmental organizations and associations of families of missing persons and victims from post-Yugoslav countries, gave preference to a regional approach in dealing with the past. In the meantime, the initiative on regional approach and context grew into an initiative to establish a Regional Commission for establishing and telling the facts about war crimes and other serious violations of human rights on the territory of the former SFR Yugoslavia from January 1, 1991, to December 31, 2001 (RECOM).

=== The Coalition for RECOM (2008-2019) ===
Coalition for RECOM
- Successor: RECOM Reconciliation Network
- Formation: 28 October 2008; 17 years ago
- Founders: 100 organizations from Bosnia and Herzegovina, Croatia, Kosovo, Serbia and Montenegro
- Dissolved: December 25, 2019; 6 years ago
- Legal status: Defunct
- Headquarters: Belgrade, Serbia
- Region served: Bosnia and Herzegovina; Croatia; North Macedonia; Montenegro; Serbia; Slovenia; Kosovo
- Members: 2,200 non-governmental organizations
- Key people: Nataša Kandić, Vesna Teršelič, Mirsad Tokača
- Main organ: Assembly of the Coalition for RECOM

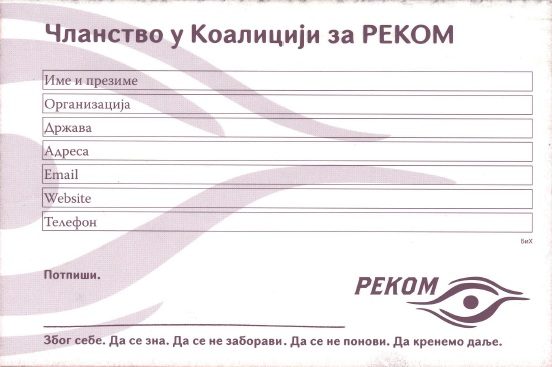
Application form to the Coalition for RECOM in the Serbian language

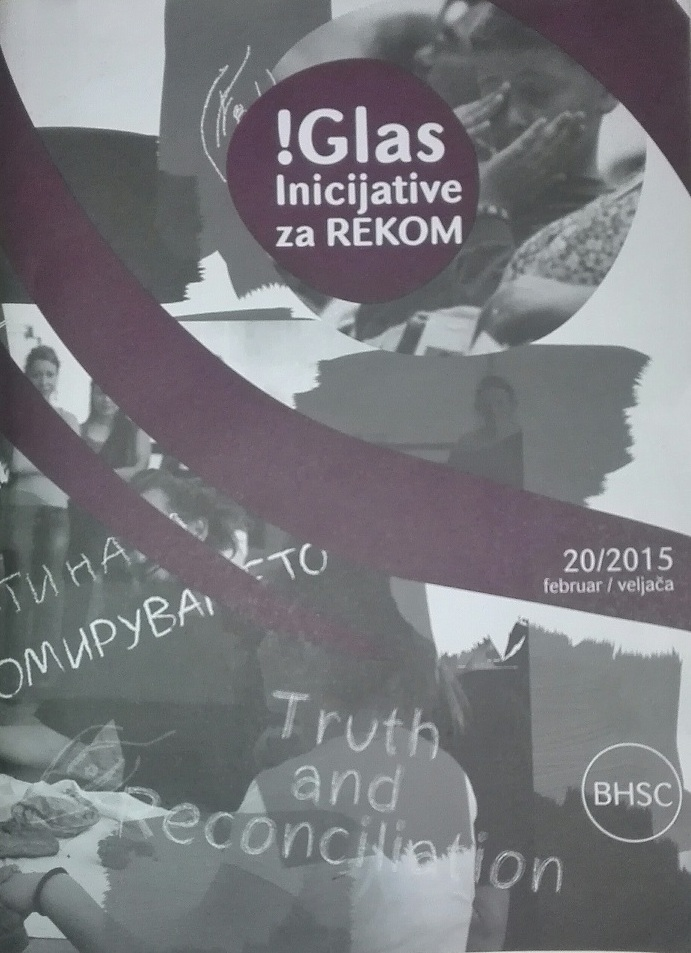
Glas Inicijative za REKOM (Voice of the Initiative for RECOM) in Bosnian, Montenegrin, Croatia and Serbian languages in 2015.

Coalition for RECOM (Albanian: Koalicioni për KOMRA; Bosnian/ Montenegrin/ Slovenian: Koalicija za REKOM; Macedonian.: Коалицијата за РЕКОМ; Serbian: Коалиција за РЕКОМ), full name The Coalition for establishment of the Regional Commission for establishing facts about war crimes and other serious violations of human rights in the territory of the former SFR Yugoslavia from January 1, 1991, to December 31, 2001, is a network of non-governmental organization, which was formed on October 28, 2008, in Kosovo Capital City Pristina. It was created in the framework of 4 of the regional forum for transitional justice in post-Yugoslav countries, by the decision of 100 organizations from Bosnia and Herzegovina, Croatia, Kosovo, Serbia and Montenegro that participated in the forum - non-governmental organizations that deal with human rights, youth organizations, associations of families of the missing and associations of former inmates. Thus, the Initiative for the establishment of RECOM became the property of the Coalition for RECOM, and the Humanitarian Law Center, Documenta – Center for Dealing with the Past and Research and Documentation Center, assumed the role of a technical-administrative support service for the consultation process. After the 4th Regional Forum for Transitional Justice in Post-Yugoslav Countries, the Research and Documentation Center withdrew from the Coordination Council and gave up further engagement and representation of the Initiative on the establishment of RECOM. In June 2010, non-governmental organizations and associations of victims and veterans from North Macedonia joined the Coalition for RECOM, and then non-governmental organizations and associations of the erased from Slovenia. Since then, the Coalition for RECOM has gathered 2,200 non-governmental organizations dealing with human rights, associations of camp inmates, associations of refugees, associations of families of the missing, artists, writers, lawyers and other prominent intellectuals who advocate the idea that the countries formed on the territory of the former SFR Yugoslavia form RECOM, whose is a task to establish facts about what happened in the immediate past.

In the period from May 2006 to March 26, 2011, the Coalition for RECOM organized a comprehensive social debate on RECOM's mandate. It was attended by 6,700 representatives of civil society, including organizations dealing with human rights, victims, families of victims and the missing, refugees, veterans, inmates, lawyers, artists, writers, journalists and other distinguished individuals. 128 local and regional meetings and eight regional forums for transitional justice were held in post-Yugoslav countries. The views presented were translated into the Draft Statute of RECOM, which was adopted by the Assembly of the Coalition for RECOM on March 26, 2011, in Sarajevo.

After the consultative process, the second phase of the process began - the institutionalization of the Initiative for RECOM. This phase represented the transfer of the Initiative for RECOM from the level of civil society to the political level. In order to gain public support for the establishment of RECOM, the Coalition organized a petition for the establishment of RECOM in May and June 2011, which was signed by 542,660 citizens from all post-Yugoslav states. In October of the same year, 145 artists and intellectuals from post-Yugoslav countries sent an open letter, in which they requested the establishment of RECOM. The letter was signed by, among others: Dino Merlin, Mirjana Karanović, Danis Tanović, Slavenka Drakulić, Slavko Goldstein, Jasmila Žbanić and others. Then the Coalition for RECOM formed a Team of Public Advocates and the action REKOM za budućnost (RECOM for the Future) was launched. Advocacy resulted in the decision of the President, that is, the Presidency of Bosnia and Herzegovina, to appoint personal representatives for RECOM. The delegates were given the task of analyzing the Statute of RECOM proposed by the Coalition for RECOM and to check the constitutional and legal possibilities for the establishment of RECOM in each individual state.

On October 28, 2014, the delegates for RECOM submitted to the Coalition for RECOM the Amendments to the Statute of RECOM, as a harmonized document that represents the legal framework for the establishment of RECOM. The Coalition for RECOM supported these changes at the Assembly on November 14, 2014. However, in the meantime, elections were held in Bosnia and Herzegovina and new members of the Presidency of Bosnia and Herzegovina were elected, and a new president was elected in Croatia, so in the first half of 2015 the Coalition for RECOM found itself in a situation where it was once again seeking support for the establishment of RECOM- And. Support was confirmed by the presidents of Serbia, Montenegro, Kosovo, North Macedonia and a member of the Presidency of Bosnia and Herzegovina from among the Bosniak people. They also supported the strategy of the Coalition for RECOM that the issue of establishing RECOM be considered within the framework of the Berlin Process. In just a few days, in May 2017, 52,919 citizens of Sarajevo, Banja Luka, Pristina, Zagreb and Belgrade signed a petition for an agreement between the leaders of the post-Yugoslav countries on the establishment of RECOM within the framework of the Berlin process. In the Declaration of the chairman of the summit in Trieste, on July 12, 2017, the recommendation of the Civil Society Forum for the establishment of RECOM, as a joint effort of the participants of the summit, was highlighted. In connection with the summit in London, which was held on July 10, 2018, the Coalition for RECOM invited the prime ministers of Serbia, Montenegro, Kosovo and North Macedonia to sign the Declaration on the establishment of RECOM and invite the remaining post-Yugoslav countries to join the joint job - making a list of human losses in the wars that resulted from the breakup of SFR Yugoslavia.

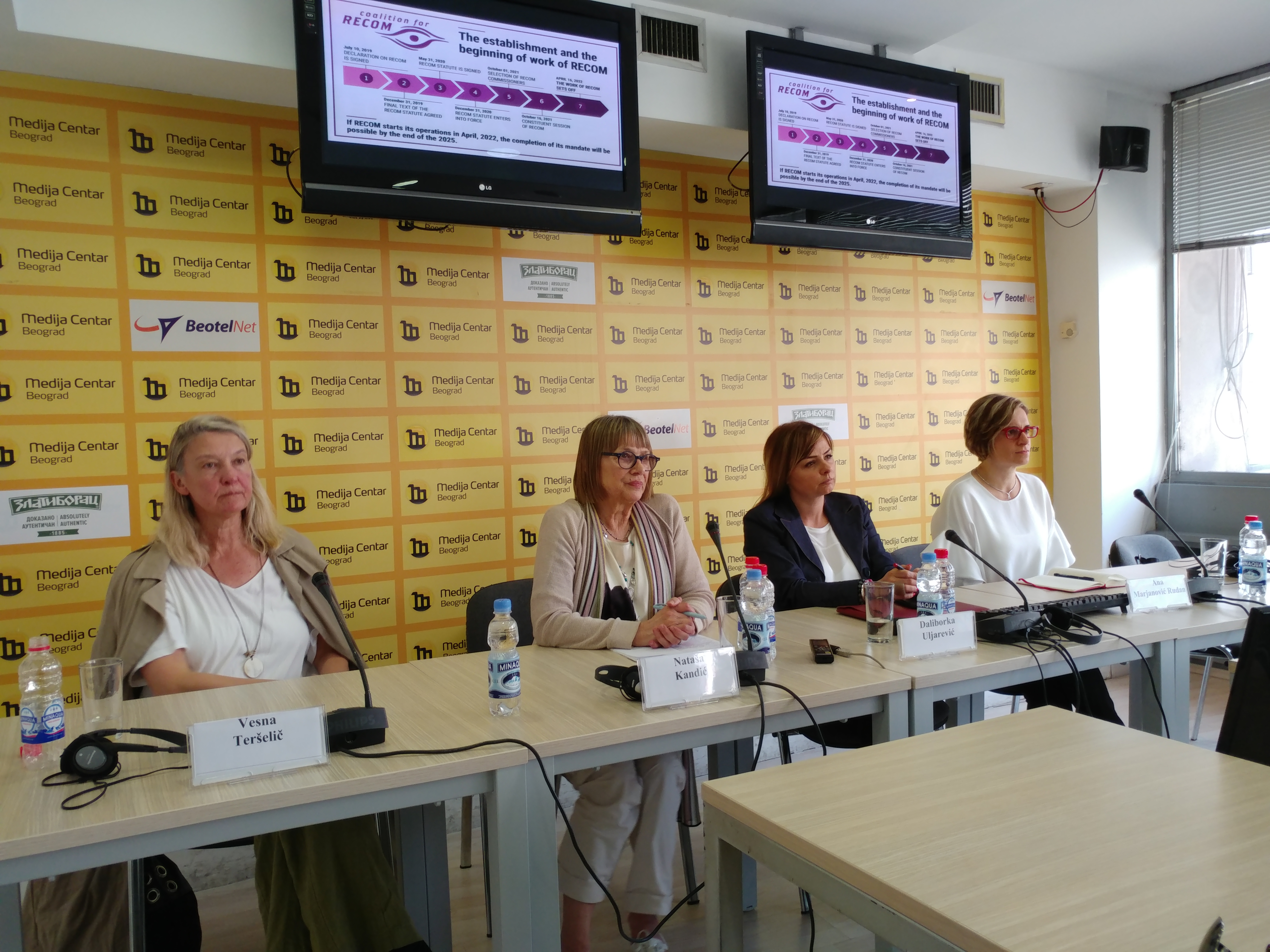
Conference "Roadmap for RECOM and Strengthening the Regional Reconciliation Network" in Belgrade on May 23, 2018. Left-Right: Vesna Teršelič, Nataša Kandić, Daliborka Uljarević, Ana Marjanović Rudan. The discussion was about initiative to call for leaders of former Yugoslavia to establish RECOM network on the forthcoming London summit within the Berlin Process in July 2018.

The Coalition for RECOM prepared the Declaration for the establishment of RECOM, with the proposal that it be signed by the ministers of foreign affairs of the Western Balkans at the summit of the Berlin Process in London in 2018, expecting that Croatia, as a member of the European Union, will subsequently join. However, the government's decision to sign the Declaration was made only by Montenegro, which is why the signing of the Declaration was removed from the agenda of the Berlin Process summit in 2018. As part of preparations for the Berlin Process summit in 2019, Honorary Director General of the European Commission Pierre Mirel, on behalf of the EU Directorate for Neighborhood Policy and Enlargement Negotiations, visited Sarajevo, and at meetings with advisers to the members of the Presidency of Bosnia and Herzegovina, he was informed that members of the Presidency from the ranks of the Bosniak and the Croatian people believe that the establishment of RECOM is an outdated initiative, that the priorities for Bosnia and Herzegovina are regional stability and security, and that Republika Srpska does not support the reconciliation based on court facts, which the Coalition for RECOM advocates.

=== RECOM Reconciliation Network (2019-) ===
RECOM Reconciliation Network
- Formation: 25 December 2019; 6 years ago
- Type: Network
- Headquarters: Belgrade, Serbia
- Region served: Bosnia and Herzegovina; Croatia; North Macedonia; Montenegro; Serbia; Slovenia; Kosovo
- Services: Transitional justice
- Members: 2,200 non-governmental organizations
- Coordinator: Nataša Kandić
- Key people: Nataša Kandić, Vesna Teršelič, Edvin Kanka Ćudić, Daliborka Uljarević, Bekim Blakaj, Svetlana Slapšak
- Website: www.recom.link

Faced with the end of political support, the Assembly of the Coalition for RECOM on December 15, 2019, at its IX session in Zagreb, made a decision on the restructuring of the RECOM Initiative - by taking over the preparation of the regional list of victims (130,000), increasing research capacities through the inclusion of community colleges from Croatia and Bosnia and Herzegovina, and securing appropriate financial resources. The delegates made a decision to transform the Coalition for RECOM into the RECOM Reconciliation Network (RMP) (Albanian: KOMRA přetjti i přijljit; Bosnian/ Croatian, Montenegrin / Slovenian: RECOM mreža pomirenja; English: RECOM Reconciliation Network; Macedonian: РЕКОМ мрежа за помирување; Serbian: РЕКОМ мрежа помирења), which aims to list the war victims of the wars of the 1990s, starting from the facts about the victims of war crimes established by the Hague Tribunal and local courts and the facts collected by the Coalition for RECOM about war victims in Croatia and Kosovo.

With that decision, the Statute of RECOM, agreed upon by the joint work of the representatives of the presidents of Croatia, Serbia, two members of the Presidency of Bosnia and Herzegovina, Montenegro, Kosovo and North Macedonia and experts of the Coalition for RECOM in 2014, ceased to be valid and symbolizes the political will of the leaders of the post-Yugoslav countries to jointly establish RECOM. The reason for reconstructing the initiative was that there is no support from Croatia for the establishment of RECOM, that reconciliation and the establishment of RECOM are no longer the political priorities of the Bosniak and Croat members of the Presidency of Bosnia and Herzegovina, that the Republika Srpska does not accept the judgments of the ICTY as a basis for determining the facts about the victims and that Slovenia considers that there are no war victims in that country, and there is no reason to participate in the list of war victims. At the session, it was decided that instead of the states, the RECOM Reconciliation Network takes care and responsibility of creating a name-by-name list of the victims of the wars that resulted from the breakup of the SFR Yugoslavia.

== Organization ==
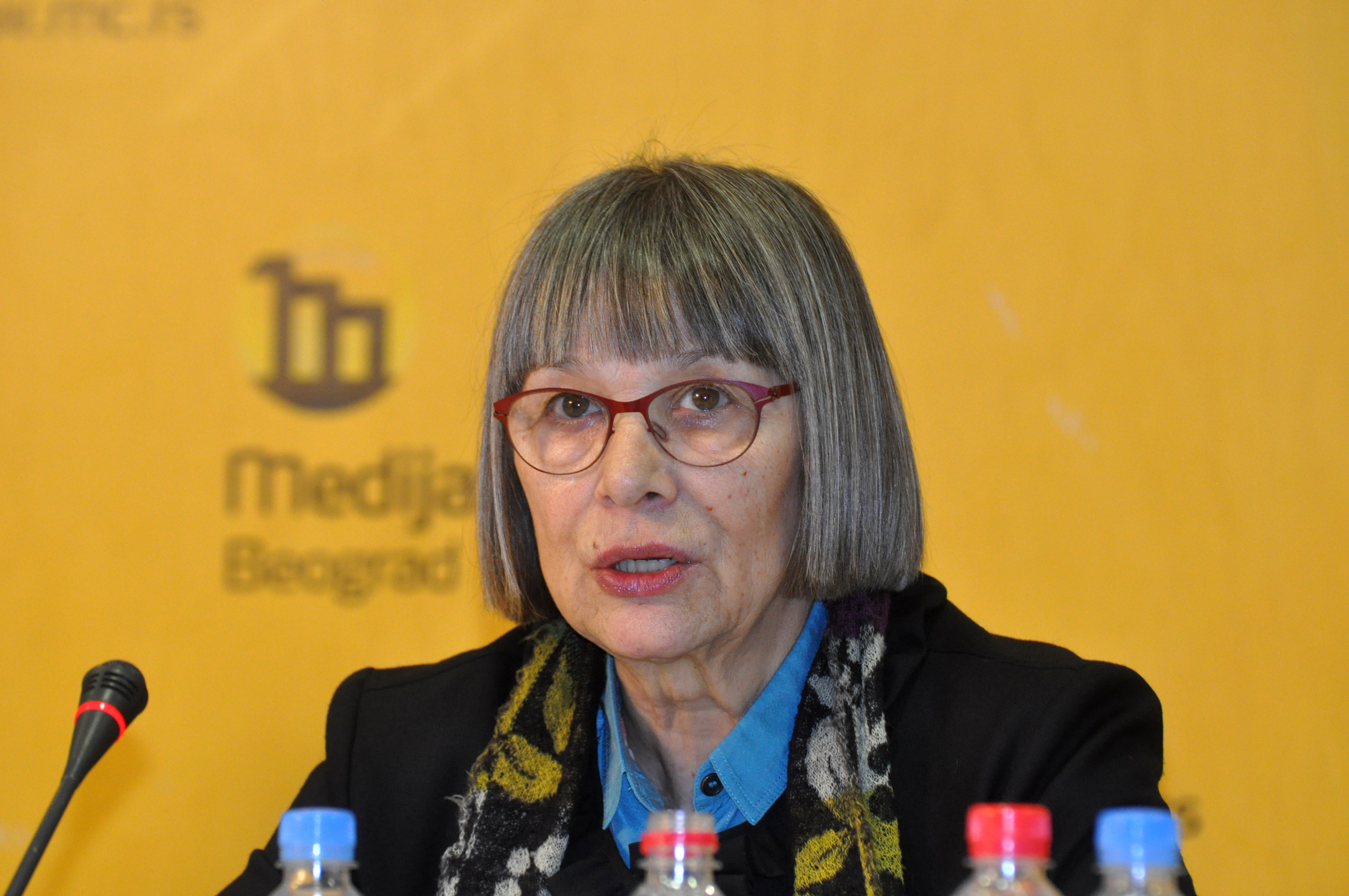
Nataša Kandić, coordinator of the RECOM Reconciliation Network

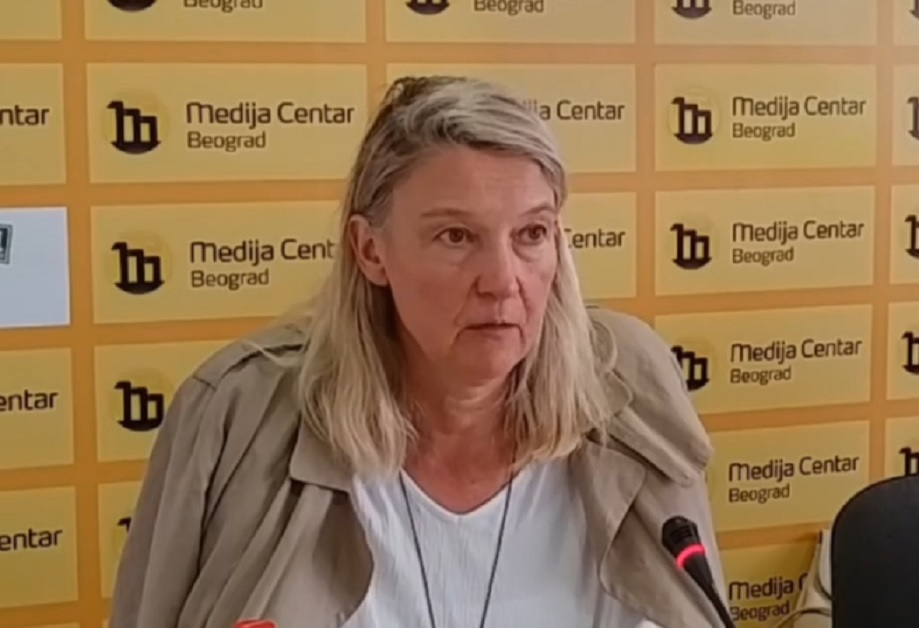
Vesna Teršelič, member of the Regional Council of the RECOM Reconciliation Network for Croatia

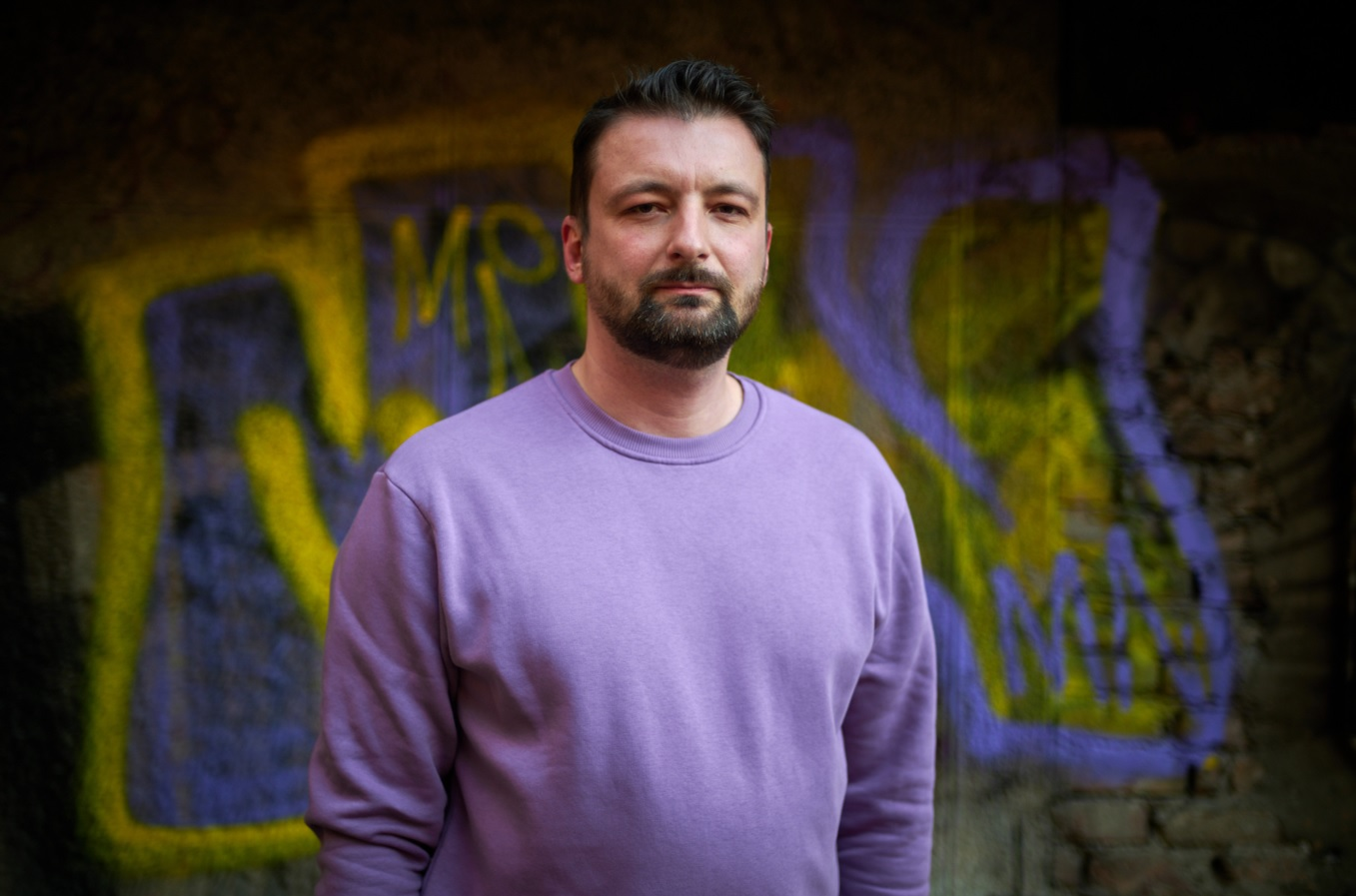
Edvin Kanka Ćudić, member of the Regional Council of the RECOM Reconciliation Network for Bosnia and Herzegovina

The highest legal act of the RECOM Reconciliation Network is the Statute. The RECOM Reconciliation Network is managed by the Assembly of Network Members. The members of the Assembly elect the members of the Regional Council.

The initiators, the Humanitarian Law Center from Belgrade, Documenta – Center for Dealing with the Past from Zagreb and Research and Documentation Center from Sarajevo, established the Coordination Council on May 9, 2008, in Podgorica. The first task of the council was to form the Coalition for RECOM and to transfer the management of the consultative process to it. The council was tasked with overseeing the implementation of the decisions of the Assembly of the Coalition for RECOM. The Coordinating Council ceased to exist with the establishment of the Regional Council. At the 7th session of the Assembly of the Coalition for RECOM held in Belgrade in 2014, at the suggestion of councilors, the Regional Council was formed, which today provides technical and professional support, and consists of civil society organizations participating in RECOM. Each state has one representative in the Regional Council, and the council is also responsible for implementing the conclusions of the Assembly of the Coalition for RECOM. The Regional Council is headed by the Coordinator of the Coalition for RECOM. In 2019, the Coalition for RECOM was reconstructed, and on that occasion the name was changed to RECOM Reconciliation Network.

=== Compositions of the Regional Council ===
The Regional Council is the highest governing body in the RECOM Reconciliation Network between the two Assemblies. It consists of seven representatives of civil society organizations from the states that emerged from the disintegration of SFR Yugoslavia. Its composition, election of members, manner of decision-making and competencies are regulated by the Statute. He is accountable to the Assembly of RECOM for his work. Members of the Regional Council present the RECOM Reconciliation Network in the public opinion.

Regional Council 2014 – 2018
State	Name and surname	Organization	Term of office	Started	Finished
Bosnia and Herzegovina	Dženana Karup Druško	TPOS BiH	member	2014	2019
Montenegro	Daliborka Uljarević	CGO	member	2014	2018
Croatia	Vesna Teršelič	Documenta	member	2014	2018
Kosovo	Bekim Blakaj	FHP Kosovo	member	2014	2018
North Macedonia	Mile Aleksoski	CRPM	member	2014	2018
Srbija	Nataša Kandić	FHP	coordinator	2014	2018
Slovenia	Svetlana Slapšak	SKC Danilo Kiš	member	2014	2018
Regional Council 2018–present
Bosnia and Herzegovina	Edvin Kanka Ćudić	UDIK	member	2019	present
Montenegro	Daliborka Uljarević	CGO	member	2018	present
Croatia	Vesna Teršelič	Documenta	member	2018	present
Kosovo	Bekim Blakaj	FHP Kosovo	member	2018	present
North Macedonia	Mile Aleksoski	CRPM	member	2018	present
Serbia	Nataša Kandić	FHP	coordinator	2018.	present
Slovenia	Svetlana Slapšak	SKC Danilo Kiš	member	2018	present

=== Composition of the Team of Public advocates ===
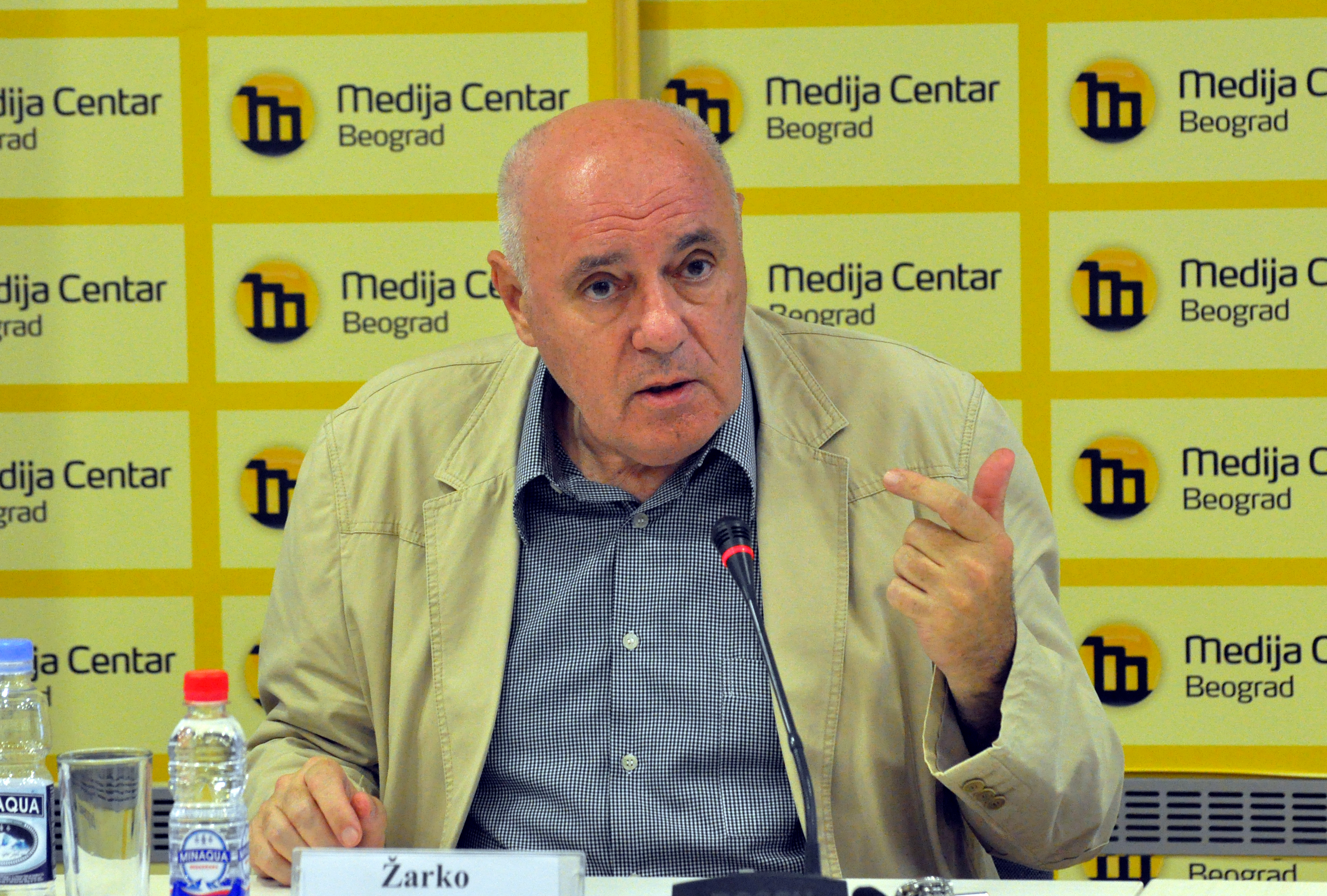
Žarko Puhovski, the public advocate of RECOM in Croatia

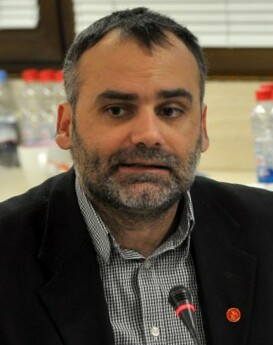
Dino Mustafić, the public advocate of RECOM in Bosnia and Herzegovina

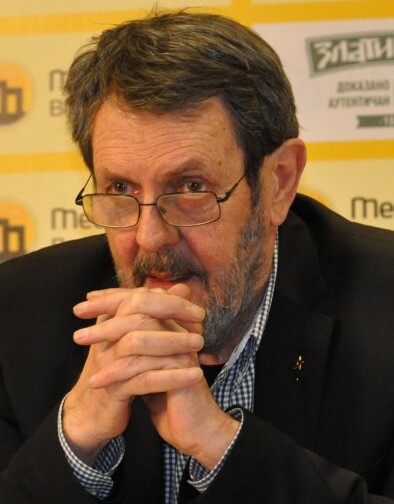
Zdravko Grebo, was the public advocate of RECOM in Bosnia and Herzegovina

Public advocates are responsible for political advocacy. Through their public and active engagement in society and with politicians in their countries, they advocate and initiate support for the establishment of RECOM.

Team of Public advocates 2011–present
State	Name and surname	Profession	Started	Finished
Bosnia and Herzegovina	Dino Mustafić	director	2011	present
Bosnia and Herzegovina	Zdravko Grebo	jurist	2011	2019
Bosnia and Herzegovina	Dženana Karup Druško	journalist	2012	2019
Montenegro	Duško Vuković	journalist	2011	present
Croatia	Žarko Puhovski	philosopher	2011	present
Kosovo	Adriatik Kelmendi	journalist	2011	present
North Macedonia	Židas Daskalovski	political scientist	2011	present
Serbia	Nataša Kandić	activist for human rights	2011	present
Serbia	Dinko Gruhonjić	journalist	2011	present
Slovenia	Igor Mekina	journalist	2011	present

=== Regional forums and Assemblies ===
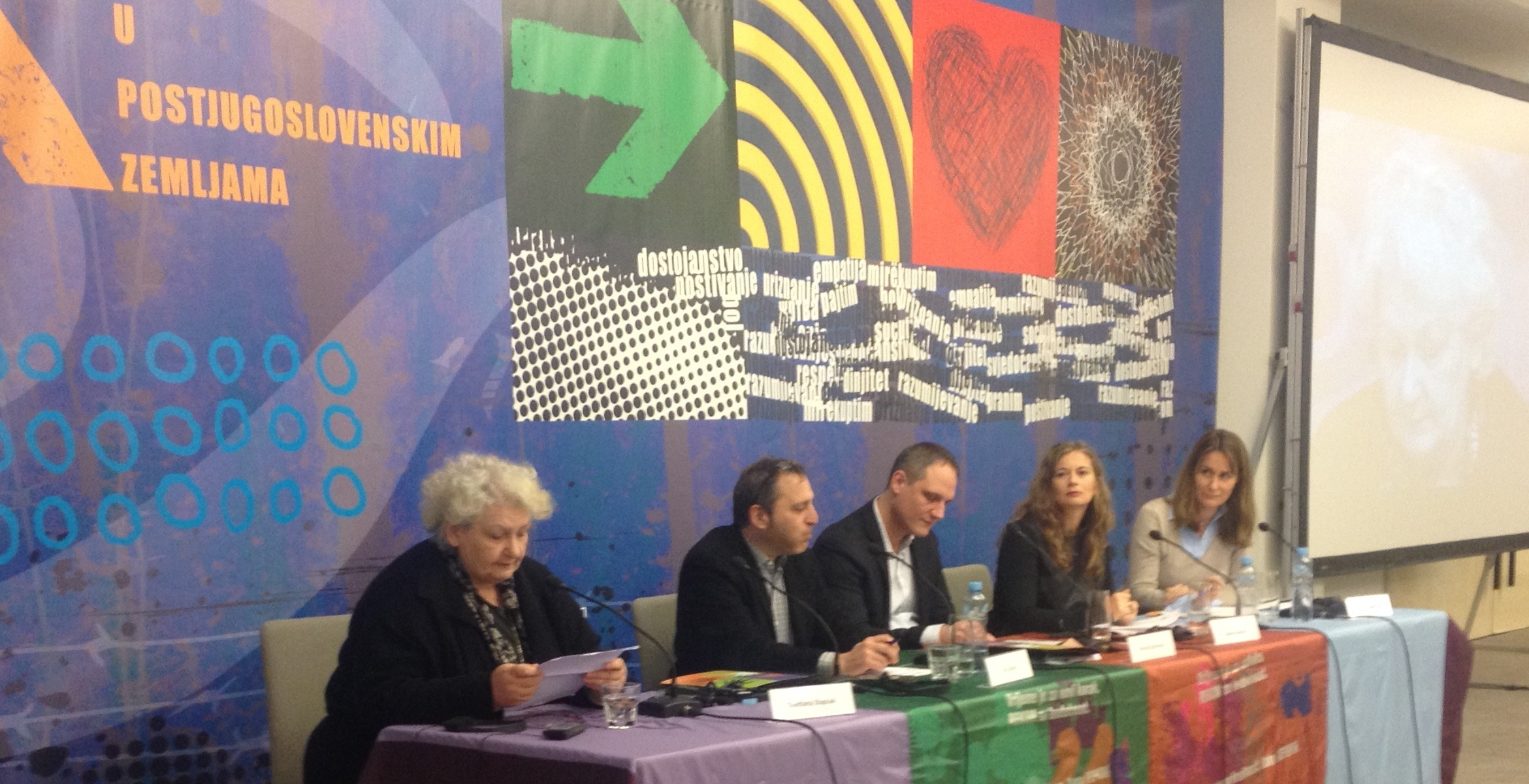
10th Regional forum of transitional justice in post-Yugoslav countries, Belgrade, 2014

Regional transitional justice forums in the post-Yugoslav countries deal with challenges, problems and aspects important for transitional justice in the post-conflict societies of the Western Balkans. Several hundred activists from the region attend each forum. As part of the forum, the Assembly of the RECOM Reconciliation Network also meets regularly.

Regional forums of transitional justice in post-Yugoslav countries and Assemblies of the Coalition for RECOM
State	City	Forum	Assembly	Date
Bosnia and Herzegovina	Sarajevo	1st regional forum	-	5-6 May 2006
Croatia	Zagreb	2nd Regional forum	-	8-9. February 2007
Serbia	Belgrade	3rd Regional forum	-	11–12 February 2008
Kosovo	Pristina	4th Regional forum	1st Assembly	28–29 October 2008
Montenegro	Budva	5th Regional forum	2nd Assembly	29–30 May 2009
Serbia	Novi Sad	6th Regional forum	3rd Assembly	20–21 March 2010
Croatia	Zagreb	7th Regional forum	4th Assembly	16–17 October 2010
Bosnia and Herzegovina	Sarajevo	8th regional forum	5th Assembly	27 June 2011
Bosnia and Herzegovina	Istočno Sarajevo	9th Regional forum	6th Assembly	17–18 May 2013
Serbia	Belgrade	10th regional forum	7th Assembly	14–16 November 2014
Bosnia and Herzegovina	Sarajevo	11th regional forum	8th Assembly	29–30 January 2018
Regional forums of transitional justice in post-Yugoslav countries and Assemblies of the RECOM Reconciliation Network
Croatia	Zagreb	12th regional forum	9th Assembly	15–16. December 2019
Serbia	Online^{1}	13th Regional forum	-	21–22 December 2020
Serbia	Belgrade	14th Regional forum	-	17–18 December 2021
Croatia	Zagreb	15th Regional forum	-	12–14 December 2022
Kosovo	Pristina	16th Regional forum	-	27–28 July 2024
Croatia	Zagreb	17th Regional forum	-	13–14 December 2025
^{1}The Regional forum was held via video conference due to the COVID-19 pandemic

== Criticism ==
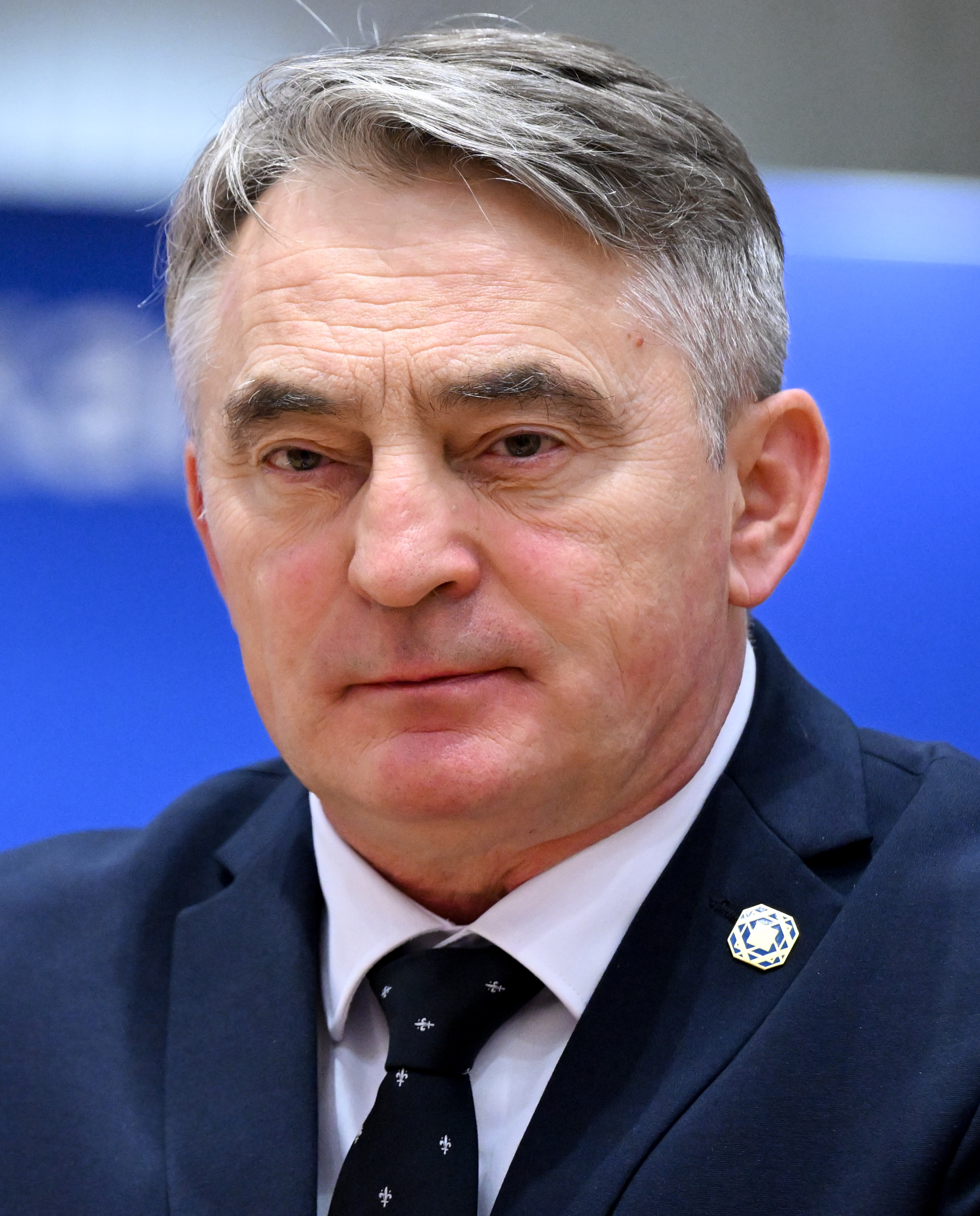
Željko Komšić, a member of the Presidency of Bosnia and Herzegovina supported the establishment of the RECOM in 2011

The first article about the Initiative to establish RECOM was published by Radio Free Europe on October 29, 2007. Since then, until the end of August 2011, over 600 articles were published in the media, both printed and electronic. This primarily refers to the reactions of proponents of the establishment of RECOM, then polemical reviews of the Initiative, interviews with personalities who support or oppose the idea of RECOM, author's articles about RECOM, television and radio shows about the Initiative, and contributions directed against the Initiative.

When it comes to criticism of the Initiative for RECOM, then it should be pointed out that the president of the Union of detainee of the Republika Srpska Branislav Dukić called on all Serbian former detainee and citizens not to respond to calls to collect signatures for the establishment of RECOM, because "Serbian patriots are well aware that the director of the Humanitarian Law Center, Nataša Kandić, who is the biggest Serbian hater, who is behind that project, which the aim to reduce the number of Serbian victims in the past Defense-Patriotic War, declaring the Serbs the only culprits for war, and (Republika) Srpska a genocidal creation". In a similar way, the head of the Team for coordinating the activities of the investigation of war crimes and the search for missing persons of the Republika Srpska, Staša Košarac, invaited citizens to boycott the signing of the petition for the establishment of RECOM, "the latest prank of the director of the Belgrade Humanitarian Law Center, Nataša Kandić", which, according to Košarac, at any cost, it wants to "completely implement the project of demonizing the Serbs" on the territory of the former SFR Yugoslavia. And the Organization of Families of Captured and Killed Fighters and Missing Civilians of the Republika Srpska called on its members not to respond to the calls to collect one million signatures for the establishment of RECOM, because in their opinion "it is a calculated action that would once again brought the people to an unenviable position, because everything that should have been respected in the reconciliation of all peoples from this area was not respected, or at least in principle was thrown under the carpet".

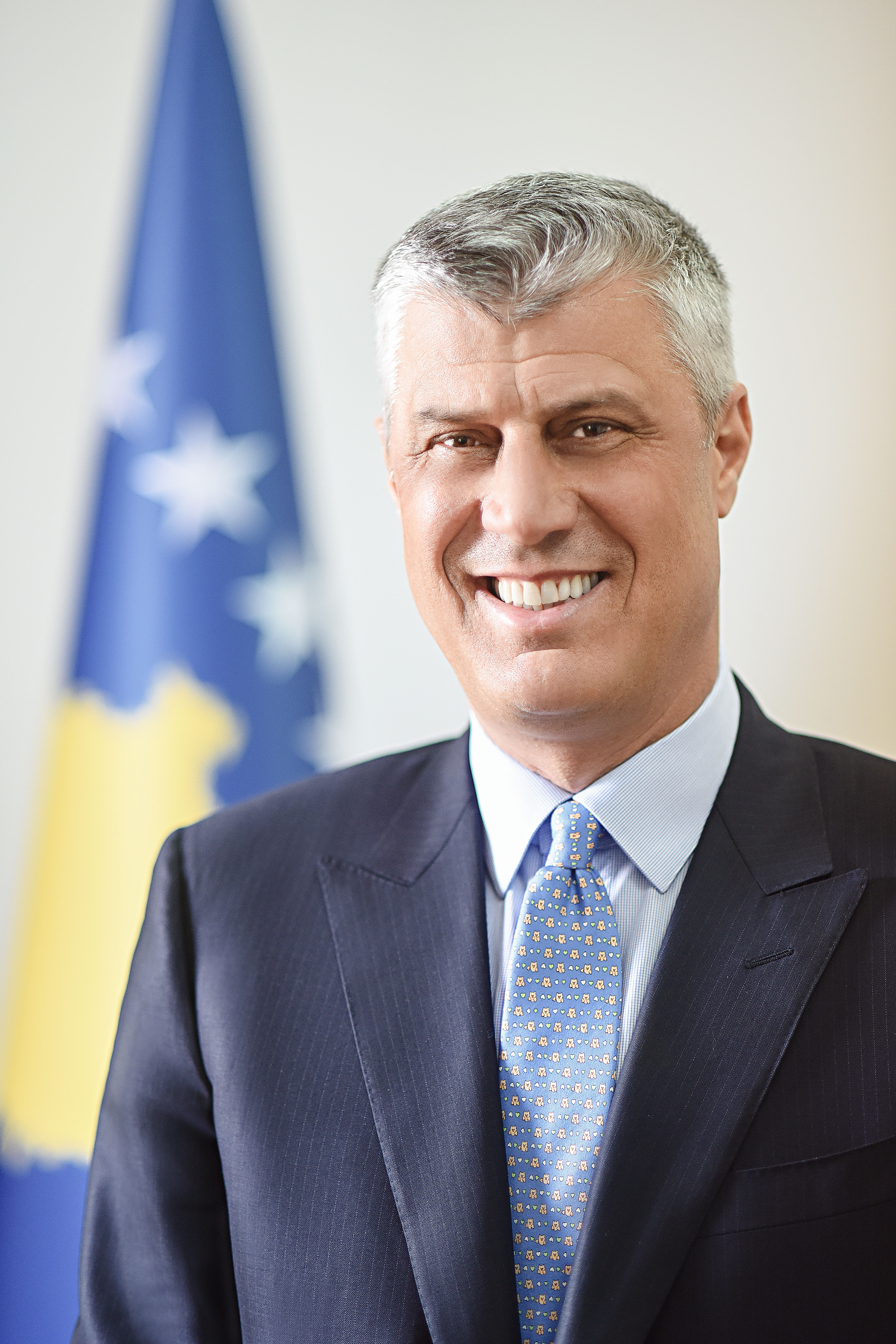
Prime Minister of Kosovo Hashim Thaçi supported the establishment of the RECOM in 2011

A popular thesis in the Croatian media is that RECOM's goal is "balance of blame" as part of the "Yugosphere" project, while the media are asking RECOM to determine who the "aggressor" is, and in the absence of a request to determine the "aggressor" some see " goal of RECOM". In a similar way, Večernji list, in an interview with Anto Nazor, director of the Memorial Centre of Homeland War in Vukovar, conveys claims that the majority of Croatian veterans do not support RECOM, because there are Croatian institutions that do for same work. According to him, it is first necessary to determine who caused the war, i.e. started the aggression in which the crimes were then committed, which is a request that is repeated in Serbia by Sonja Biserko, who believes that states should first establish national commissions, and sees the very idea of RECOM as imposed from outside. Identical theses appear in Zagreb's Globus, which suspected Nataša Kandić and Vesna Teršelič of "anti-war profiteering" and accused them of wanting to form a "private Hague Tribune", i.e. of wanting to win the Nobel Peace Prize with the RECOM project.

Although the signature collection campaign in Kosovo was extremely successful, some remarks against RECOM were heard as well in Kosovo. The Coordination of Associations of the Families of the Disappeared issued a statement stating that it "opposes the campaign to collect signatures in some cities of the Republic of Kosovo and the region initiated by the Humanitarian Law Center. The objection consisted in the claim that "as before, the servants of Belgrade are manipulating the citizens, especially to the family members of the missing, falsely stating that this initiative is mostly supported by Albanians from Kosovo, especially family members of the victims of the last conflict in Kosovo".

=== Leaving the Initiative ===
Since the founding of the Coalition in October 2008, six non-governmental organizations have resigned from the Coalition for RECOM: Research and Documentation Center in Sarajevo, Buka Media Project from Banja Luka, Helsinki Committee for Human Rights in Republika Srpska from Bijeljina, Helsinki Committee for Human Rights in Serbia from of Belgrade, Women's Association Izvor from Prijedor and Forum of Tuzla Citizens. The reasons for leaving were mostly of a material nature, and in some cases disagreement with the policy of the Coalition for RECOM.

=== Scandals ===
In 2010, a meeting of the Coalition for RECOM was held in Sarajevo, where the role of religious communities and churches in restoring trust between communities was discussed, as well as the willingness of religious communities to contribute to establishing the facts about the war in the former Yugoslavia. During the meeting, the presence of the Montenegrin metropolitan irritated the representative of the Serbian Orthodox Church, who ultimately demanded that the Montenegrin metropolitan leave the meeting of the Coalition for RECOM. The representative of the Catholic Church agreed with the Serbian Orthodox Church representative. Nataša Kandić, due to the protests of the Serbian Orthodox Church and the Catholic Church, removed from the meeting Metropolitan Mihailo of the Montenegrin Orthodox Church, whom the Coalition for RECOM had invited for consultation and discussion. After that, the coalition for RECOM sent an apology to Metropolitan Mihail of the Montenegrin Orthodox Church for leaving the meeting in Sarajevo.

== Supporters ==
The Initiative for RECOM is financially supported by: European Union (EU), National Endowment for Democracy (NED), Rockefeller Brothers Fund (RBF), Civil Rights Defenders (CRD), Norwegian Ministry of Foreign Affairs, ProPeace, Swiss Confederation and Comité catholique contre la faim et pour le développement (CCFD)-Terre Solidaire).
