= The Scorpions, A Home Movie =

1995 Serbian film

- Insignia of the Serbian paramilitary group Scorpions, the perpetrators in the film.
- Directed by: Lazar Stojanović
- Produced by: Nataša Kandić
- Release dates: 1995 (original); 2007 (recovered)
- Running time: ~28 minutes ~2 hours (uncut)
- Country: Republic of Bosnia and Herzegovina
- Languages: Bosnian; Serbian

The Scorpions, A Home Movie (Serbian Cyrillic: Шкорпиони, кућни филм; Bosnian: Škorpioni, kućni film) is a 1995 film by director Lazar Stojanović and producer Nataša Kandić showcasing the Srebrenica massacre.

== Synopsis ==
The film showcases the Srebrenica massacre, in which 8,000 Bosnian Muslims were systematically killed from 11 to 31 July 1995 during the Bosnian War. It shows the Serbian paramilitary group Scorpions bringing six Bosnian Muslims into a ditch, then firing above them. Later, they were brought near the village of Trnovo, where they were systematically executed. The tape reportedly showed the members firing upon a refugee column on the Pale–Srebrenica road and littering their corpses on the road.

After the war, it was passed around as a war souvenir by the members of the group. The commander ordered the destruction of all tapes, but one managed to stay by a member of the group. In 2005, a recording of the tape was shown during the trial of Slobodan Milošević.

== 2007 recovery and broadcasting ==
In 2007, Nataša Kandić had recovered a copy of the original tape from a man in Šid, reportedly a part of the paramilitary group, who provided it only on the condition that she not air it until he had safely left the country. A cut 28 minute version was broadcast on Serbian and Bosnian television. The Guardian described the tape as the "smoking gun" and "the final, incontrovertible proof of Serbia's part in the Srebrenica massacres." The New York Times called the airing of the tape on Serbian television a "watershed" moment for the country.
