= Katarina Kruhonja =

Katarina Kruhonja (born 1949) is a peace activist from Osijek, eastern Croatia. She is a co - founder of the Centre for Peace, Non-violence and Human Rights - Osijek, an NGO based in Osijek, set up with the support of Adam Curle. In 1998, she was joint recipient of the Right Livelihood Award along with Vesna Teršelič of the Anti-War Campaign of Croatia.
