= Stanislava Hrnjak =

Serbian politician

Stanislava Hrnjak (Serbian Cyrillic: Станислава Хрњак; born 28 October 1976) is a politician in Serbia. She has served in the Assembly of Vojvodina since 2020 as a member of the Serbian Progressive Party.

== Private career ==
Hrnjak was born in Kikinda, Vojvodina, in what was then the Socialist Republic of Serbia in the Socialist Federal Republic of Yugoslavia. She graduated from the higher school for teacher education "Zora Krdžalić Zaga" (1997) and the Faculty of Education in Sombor (1999). She lives in Kikinda.

== Politician ==
=== Municipal politics ===
Hrnjak entered political life as a member of the far-right Serbian Radical Party, appearing in the eighteenth position on the party's electoral list in Kikinda for the 2008 Serbian local elections. The party won a plurality victory in the election and emerged as the dominant presence in a local coalition government; Hrnjak was appointed to the municipal council (i.e., the local government's executive branch) on 3 June 2008, with responsibility for information and social protection.

The Radical Party experienced a serious split later in the year, with several members joining the more moderate Progressive Party under the leadership of Tomislav Nikolić and Aleksandar Vučić. Hrnjak sided with the Progressives. The split in the Radicals prompted a turnover in the local government, and Hrnjak was removed from council on 17 October 2008.

She appeared in the third position on the Progressive Party's electoral list for Kikinda in the 2012 local elections and was elected to the municipal assembly when the list won twelve out of thirty-nine mandates. Following another turnover in the local government, she was re-appointed to council on 13 September 2013 with responsibility for education, culture, and information.

Hrnjak received the 218th position on the Progressive Party's Aleksandar Vučić — Future We Believe In list in the 2014 Serbian parliamentary election. This was too low a position for election to be a realistic prospect, and she was not elected even as the list won a majority victory with 158 out of 250 mandates.

She was given the thirty-second position on the Progressive list for Kikinda in the 2016 local elections. The list won a majority victory with twenty-six mandates, and she was not initially elected. She received a mandate on 6 October 2017 as the replacement for another party member and, on the same day, was appointed as president (i.e., speaker) of the city assembly. She held this role for the next three years and did not seek re-election at the city level in 2020.

=== Provincial politics ===
Hrnjak sought election to the Assembly of Vojvodina in the 2012 provincial election, running as the Progressive Party candidate in Kikinda's first division. She was narrowly defeated in the second round. After this election, the province switched to a system of full proportional representation.

She received the forty-third position on the Progressive Party's Aleksandar Vučić — For Our Children list in the 2020 provincial election and was elected when the list won a majority victory with seventy-six out of 120 mandates. In October 2020, she was appointed as the president of the assembly committee for education and science. She is also a member of the committee on national equality.

== Electoral record ==
=== Provincial (Vojvodina) ===
2012 Vojvodina assembly election Kikinda I (constituency seat) - First and Second Rounds
Ilija Vojinović	Coalition: Choice for a Better Vojvodina–Bojan Pajtić (Affiliation: Democratic Party)	2,513	17.66	6,013	50.65
Stanislava Hrnjak	Let's Get Vojvodina Moving–Tomislav Nikolić (Serbian Progressive Party, New Serbia, Movement of Socialists, Strength of Serbia Movement) (Affiliation: Serbian Progressive Party)	2,989	21.00	5,859	49.35
Stevan Grbić	Socialist Party of Serbia (SPS), Party of United Pensioners of Serbia (PUPS), United Serbia (JS), and Social Democratic Party of Serbia (SDP Serbia)	1,972	13.86		
Goran Dumitrov "Data"	U-Turn	1,947	13.68		
Milan Mitrić	League of Social Democrats of Vojvodina–Nenad Čanak	1,508	10.60		
Imre Kabok	Alliance of Vojvodina Hungarians	960	6.75		
Vladimir Pudar	Democratic Party of Serbia	857	6.02		
Neca Bajšanski	Citizens' Group: Strength of Kikinda	784	5.51		
Želimir Bajić	United Regions of Serbia–Karolj Damjanov	701	4.93		
Total valid votes		14,231	100	11,872	100
