= Miloš Šibul =

Serbian politician (1977–2021)

Miloš Đ. Šibul (Serbian Cyrillic: Милош Ђ. Шибул; 23. August 1977 – 12. November 2021. ) was a politician in Serbia. He served in the Assembly of Vojvodina from 2012 to 2016 as a member of the League of Social Democrats of Vojvodina (Liga socijaldemokrata Vojvodine, LSV). He was also the president of the League of Farmers of Vojvodina (Lige paora Vojvodine).

== Early life and private career ==
Šibul was born in Novi Sad, Vojvodina, in what was then the Socialist Republic of Serbia in the Socialist Federal Republic of Yugoslavia. He was raised in Kikinda, where his family has resided for several generations. Šibul graduated from the University of Novi Sad Faculty of Agriculture, specializing in phytomedicine, and worked for the private company Poljopromet as an expert advisor in the use of pesticides. He was also a farmer.

== Politician ==
Šibul joined the LSV in 1995 and was the leader of its Kikinda municipal committee for several years. He served a number of terms in the municipal assembly.

He was elected to the Vojvodina assembly in the 2012 provincial election for Kikinda's second constituency seat. The LSV took part in Vojvodina's coalition government after the election, and Šibul served as a supporter of the administration. Vojvodina subsequently abolished its constituency seats and adopted a system of full proportional representation for the 2016 provincial election. Šibul received the seventeenth position on the LSV's electoral list and was not returned when the list won nine seats.

He also appeared as a LSV candidate in the 2012 and 2016 Serbian parliamentary elections, although he was not elected on either occasion.

As president of the League of Farmers of Vojvodina, Šibul was an opponent of Serbia's Law on Agricultural Land, on the grounds that it allowed the government to give state land to investors without clear criteria. He also criticized Serbia's government for confiscating land from indebted farmers unable to pay compulsory fees and taxes.

== Death ==
Šibul died on 12 November 2021, after a heart attack.

== Electoral record ==
=== Provincial (Vojvodina) ===
2012 Vojvodina assembly election Kikinda II (constituency seat) - First and Second Rounds
Miloš Šibul	League of Social Democrats of Vojvodina–Nenad Čanak	2,644	17.38	7,741	53.81
Svetislav Vukmirica	Let's Get Vojvodina Moving–Tomislav Nikolić (Serbian Progressive Party, New Serbia, Movement of Socialists, Strength of Serbia Movement) (Affiliation: Serbian Progressive Party)	3,959	26.02	6,644	46.19
Savo Dobranić (incumbent)	Choice for a Better Vojvodina (Affiliation: Democratic Party)	2,398	15.76		
Gojko Grubor	Socialist Party of Serbia (SPS), Party of United Pensioners of Serbia (PUPS), United Serbia (JS), Social Democratic Party of Serbia (SDP Serbia) (Affiliation: Socialist Party)	1,284	8.44		
Branislav Bajić	Citizen's Group: Strength of Kikinda	1,255	8.25		
Paja Francuski	U-Turn	941	6.18		
Ferenc Lepár	Alliance of Vojvodina Hungarians	847	5.57		
Karolj Damjanov	United Regions of Serbia–Karolj Damjanov	811	5.33		
Mladen Koprivica	Democratic Party of Serbia	556	3.65		
Nikola Jankov	Serbian Radical Party	520	3.42		
Total valid votes		15,215	100	14,385	100
