= Svetislav Vukmirica =

Serbian politician

Svetislav Vukmirica (Serbian Cyrillic: Светислав Вукмирица; born 24 December 1972) is a politician in Serbia. He served in the National Assembly of Serbia from 2014 to 2016 as a member of the Serbian Progressive Party.

== Early life and career ==
Vukmirica was born in Kikinda, Vojvodina, in what was then the Socialist Republic of Serbia in the Socialist Federal Republic of Yugoslavia. He is a graduate of the University of Novi Sad Faculty of Law and subsequently worked in Kikinda as a teacher and trainee prosecutor.

He has practiced judo at a competitive level and has led both the Kikinda Judo Club "Partizan" and the International Judo Camp in the city. In 2017, he was appointed to the complaints commission of the Sports Association of Vojvodina.

== Politician ==
=== Municipal ===
Vukmirica started his political career as a member of the Democratic Party of Serbia. He received the lead position on the party's electoral list for the Kikinda municipal assembly in the 2008 Serbian local elections. The party won two seats and he subsequently took a mandate in the assembly. (Between 2000 and 2011, mandates in Serbian elections were distributed at the discretion of successful parties or coalitions, and it was common practice for the mandates to be distributed out of numerical order. Vukmirica did not automatically receive a mandate by virtue of leading his party's list, although he ultimately chose to serve in the assembly.)

The Democratic Party of Serbia initially joined a coalition government led by the Serbian Radical Party in Kikinda following the 2008 local elections, and Vukmirica was selected as president (i.e., speaker) of the municipal assembly when that body convened in June. The coalition government fell apart in October following a split within the ranks of the Radicals, and Vukmirica stood down from the position. In 2010, he joined the Serbian Progressive Party.

Serbia's electoral system was reformed in 2011, such that mandates were awarded in numerical order to candidates on successful lists. Vukmirica received the fourth position on the Progressive list in the 2012 local elections and was re-elected when the list won twelve mandates. The Progressives initially served in opposition but formed a new coalition government in September 2013, and Vukmurica was appointed to a term as deputy mayor.

=== Vojvodina provincial politics ===
Vukmirica appeared in the thirtieth position on the Democratic Party of Serbia's electoral list in the 2008 Vojvodina provincial election. The list won four proportional mandates, and Vukmirica was not chosen for his party's delegation. He later ran as the Serbian Progressive Party's candidate for Kikinda's second constituency seat in the 2012 Vojvodina provincial election and was defeated in the second round by Miloš Šibul of the League of Social Democrats of Vojvodina.

=== Member of the National Assembly ===
Vukmirica received the 110th position on the Aleksandar Vučić — Future We Believe In list in the 2014 parliamentary election and was elected when the list won a landslide victory with 158 seats. For the next two years, he served as part of the government's parliamentary majority. In a July 2014 interview, he highlighted his work as a member of Serbia's parliamentary friendship group with Romania.

He was given the 167th position on the successor Aleksandar Vučić — Serbia Is Winning list in the 2016 parliamentary election. The list won 131 mandates, and on this occasion he was not returned.

== Since 2016 ==
After leaving the national assembly, Vukmirica was appointed as director of the Gerontology Center in Kikinda.

== Electoral record ==
=== Provincial (Vojvodina) ===
2012 Vojvodina assembly election Kikinda II (constituency seat) - First and Second Rounds
Miloš Šibul	League of Social Democrats of Vojvodina–Nenad Čanak	2,644	17.38	7,741	53.81
Svetislav Vukmirica	Let's Get Vojvodina Moving–Tomislav Nikolić (Serbian Progressive Party, New Serbia, Movement of Socialists, Strength of Serbia Movement) (Affiliation: Serbian Progressive Party)	3,959	26.02	6,644	46.19
Savo Dobranić (incumbent)	Choice for a Better Vojvodina (Affiliation: Democratic Party)	2,398	15.76		
Gojko Grubor	Socialist Party of Serbia (SPS), Party of United Pensioners of Serbia (PUPS), United Serbia (JS), Social Democratic Party of Serbia (SDP Serbia) (Affiliation: Socialist Party)	1,284	8.44		
Branislav Bajić	Citizen's Group: Strength of Kikinda	1,255	8.25		
Paja Francuski	U-Turn	941	6.18		
Ferenc Lepár	Alliance of Vojvodina Hungarians	847	5.57		
Karolj Damjanov	United Regions of Serbia–Karolj Damjanov	811	5.33		
Mladen Koprivica	Democratic Party of Serbia	556	3.65		
Nikola Jankov	Serbian Radical Party	520	3.42		
Total valid votes		15,215	100	14,385	100
