= Zdravko Grebo =

Bosnian jurist, author and law professor (1947–2019)

Zdravko Grebo Здравко Гребо
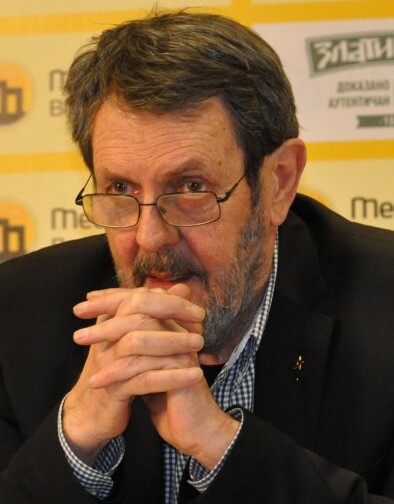
- Grebo in 2017
- Born: 30 July 1947; Mostar, PR Bosnia and Herzegovina, FPR Yugoslavia
- Died: 29 January 2019 (aged 71); Sarajevo, Bosnia and Herzegovina
- Education: University of Sarajevo (LL.B.); University of Belgrade (LL.M, LL.D.)
- Occupations: Jurisprudence, law professor

Zdravko Grebo (Serbo-Croatian Cyrillic: Здравко Гребо; 30 July 1947 – 29 January 2019) was a Bosnian jurist, author and law professor at the University of Sarajevo's Faculty of Law.

== Early life and education ==
Grebo was born on 30 July 1947 in Mostar. He graduated from the Sarajevo Law School in 1970 and attended postgraduate courses at the Department of Legal Theory of the Belgrade Law School where in 1976 he earned his doctorate. He published and edited books "Kelsen and Marx," "Foundations of the Legal System of SFR Yugoslavia," and "The Philosophy of Law."

== Career ==
From 1972, Grebo lectured at the Faculty of Law in Sarajevo, becoming a professor in January 1991. He is an author of four books and 150 articles. In 1993, he received an award from the European Rectors Club "For peace, and against racism and xenophobia", and in 1994 he was honored with the Four Freedoms Award for his work in the field of "freedom from fear". Since 2011, Grebo was a public advocate for the Initiative for RECOM. In 2017, he signed the Declaration on the Common Language of the Croats, Serbs, Bosniaks and Montenegrins.

Grebo was the founder of the Helsinki Parliament of Citizens (Bosnia and Herzegovina) and of the Open Society Foundation of Bosnia and Herzegovina. He was also director of the Center for Interdisciplinary Postgraduate Studies of the University of Sarajevo. He also served as the chief of the Department of the State and International Public Law.

== Bibliography ==
- Foundations of the Legal System of SFR Yugoslavia (1972), Belgrade
- Kelsen and Marx (1979), Sarajevo
- The Philosophy of Law (1984), New Orleans
- Contemporary American Legal Theory (1989), Sarajevo
- The new Constitution of Bosnia and Herzegovina (1993), "Theoris iuris", Sarajevo
- Elements of European law (1994), Sarajevo
