= Trnje, Suva Reka =

Tërnjë: Tërnjë (Albanian); Трње/Trnje (Serbian)
- Village
- Location in Kosovo
- Location: Kosovo
- District: Prizren
- Municipality: Suharekë

Population (2024)
  - Total: 718
- Time zone: UTC+1 (CET)
  - Summer (DST): UTC+2 (CEST)

Tërrnje is a village in the municipality of Suva Reka, Kosovo.

== History ==
During World War II, Albanians destroyed the Serbian church in the village.

On 25 March 1999 the village was the site of a massacre of 42 Albanian civilians, including children, women and elderly people, by members of the 549th Motorised Brigade of the Yugoslav Army, under the command of Major General Božidar Delić. On 8 May 2008, the Serbian human rights NGO Humanitarian Law Center filed criminal charges relating to the massacre against Božidar Delić, by then retired from his army position and deputy speaker of the Serbian National Assembly and a senior member of the Serbian Radical Party, and against another ten members of the Yugoslav Army.
