= Humanitarian Law Center =

Serbian non-governmental organization

- Founded: 1992; 34 years ago
- Type: Nonprofit; NGO
- Purpose: Human rights
- Headquarters: Belgrade, Pristina
- Region served: territories of former Socialist Federal Republic of Yugoslavia
- Product: nonprofit human rights advocacy
- CEO: Jasmina Lazović
- Affiliations: RECOM Reconciliation Network (2006–)
- Website: www.hlc-rdc.org

Humanitarian Law Center (Serbo-Croatian: Fond za humanitarno pravo/ Фонд за хуманитарно право; Albanian: Fondi për të Drejtën Humanitare), also known as the HLC, is a Serbian non-governmental organisation with offices in Belgrade, Serbia, and Pristina, Kosovo. It was founded in 1992 by Nataša Kandić to document human rights violations across the former Yugoslavia in armed conflicts in Croatia, Bosnia and Herzegovina, and, later, Kosovo.

In 2007, HLC translated into the regional languages of the countries of the former Socialist Federal Republic of Yugoslavia all the materials of the International Criminal Tribunal for the former Yugoslavia (ICTY) against Slobodan Milosevic and handed them over to the local authorities.

In the post-conflict era, HLC has continued working for the rights of victims of war crimes and social injustice, investigating the truth and pursuing justice on their behalf, working to obtain material and symbolic reparation, and campaigning to secure the removal of known perpetrators from state institutions and other positions of authority.

The HLC prepared a publication, The Memory Book of Kosovo, and posted it on the Internet in 2015 for free access. The book documents all those killed and missing from January 1998 to December 2000 as a result of hostilities.

HLC was nominated together with Nataša Kandić for the Nobel Prize in 2018.

== Human rights activities ==
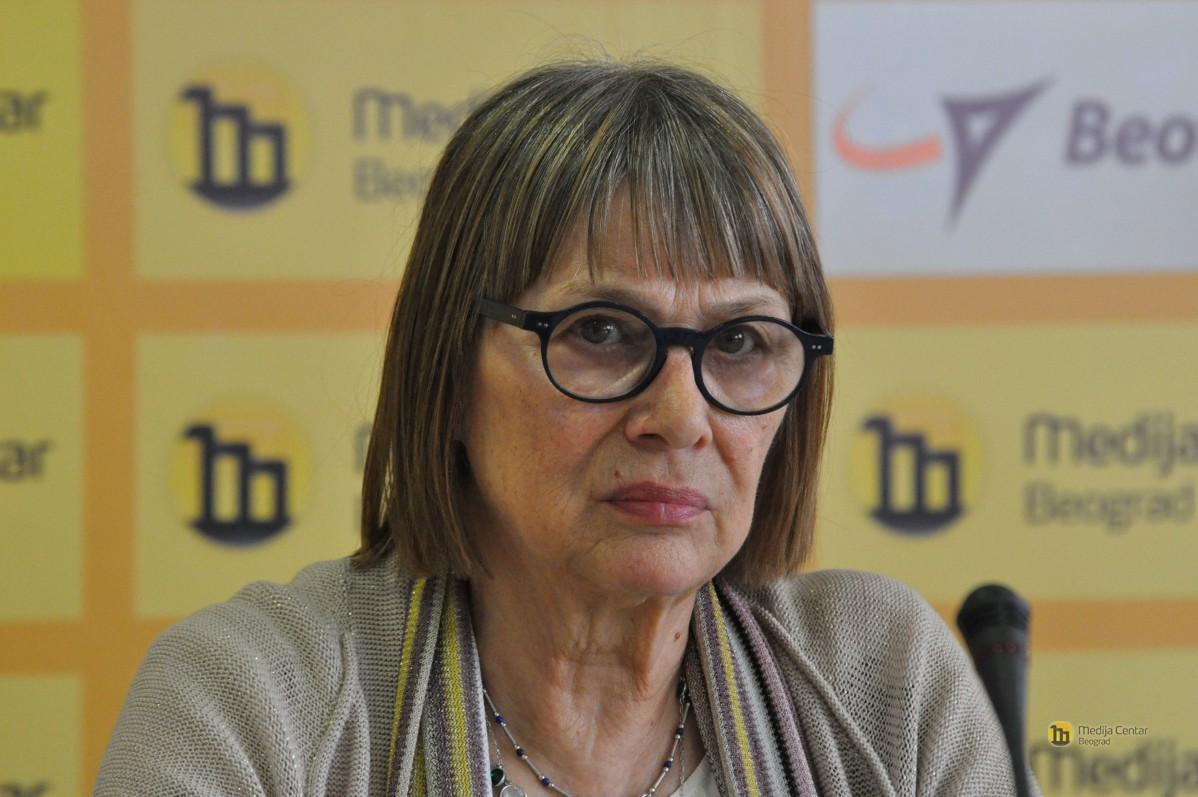
Nataša Kandić, the founder of HLC

Humanitarian Law Center (HLC) was founded in 1992 by Nataša Kandić. An important part of its work is the implementation of the program "Transitional Justice" — a program of actions to prevent massive violations of human rights in a transitional period, applied in modern post-conflict states. Implementation of Transitional Justice in post-conflict societies is supported by the European Court of Human Rights and UN Human Rights Committee.

The HLC aims to assist the successor states of the former Yugoslavia establish the rule of law and come to terms with the large-scale human rights abuses committed during armed conflicts in Croatia, Bosnia and Herzegovina, and Kosovo in particular, prevent the recurrence of such crimes, ensure perpetrators of war crimes are brought to justice and promote the cause of justice.

HLC works across national boundaries to assist post-conflict societies within the region reestablish the rule of law and deal with past human rights abuses. The Regional Commission (RECOM) initiative is an important part of HLC's regionally based activity. HLC also implements a victim-oriented Transitional Justice programme with three principal components:

- Documentation and memorialisation
- Pursuit of justice and institutional reform
- Public information and outreach

Within Serbia, HLC campaigns to ensure that state institutions fulfil their obligations to investigate, prosecute and punish the perpetrators of war crimes and human rights abuses, to provide victims, their families and society with reliable information about the events that led to crimes and abuses, to secure adequate compensation for victims and to bring about the reform of law enforcement agencies, state security bodies and the military forces.

In 2016, the HLC expressed outrage at the acquittal by the International Tribunal for the Former Yugoslavia (ICTY) of the head of the Serbian Radical Party Vojislav Seselj.

== Regional cooperation and the RECOM initiative ==
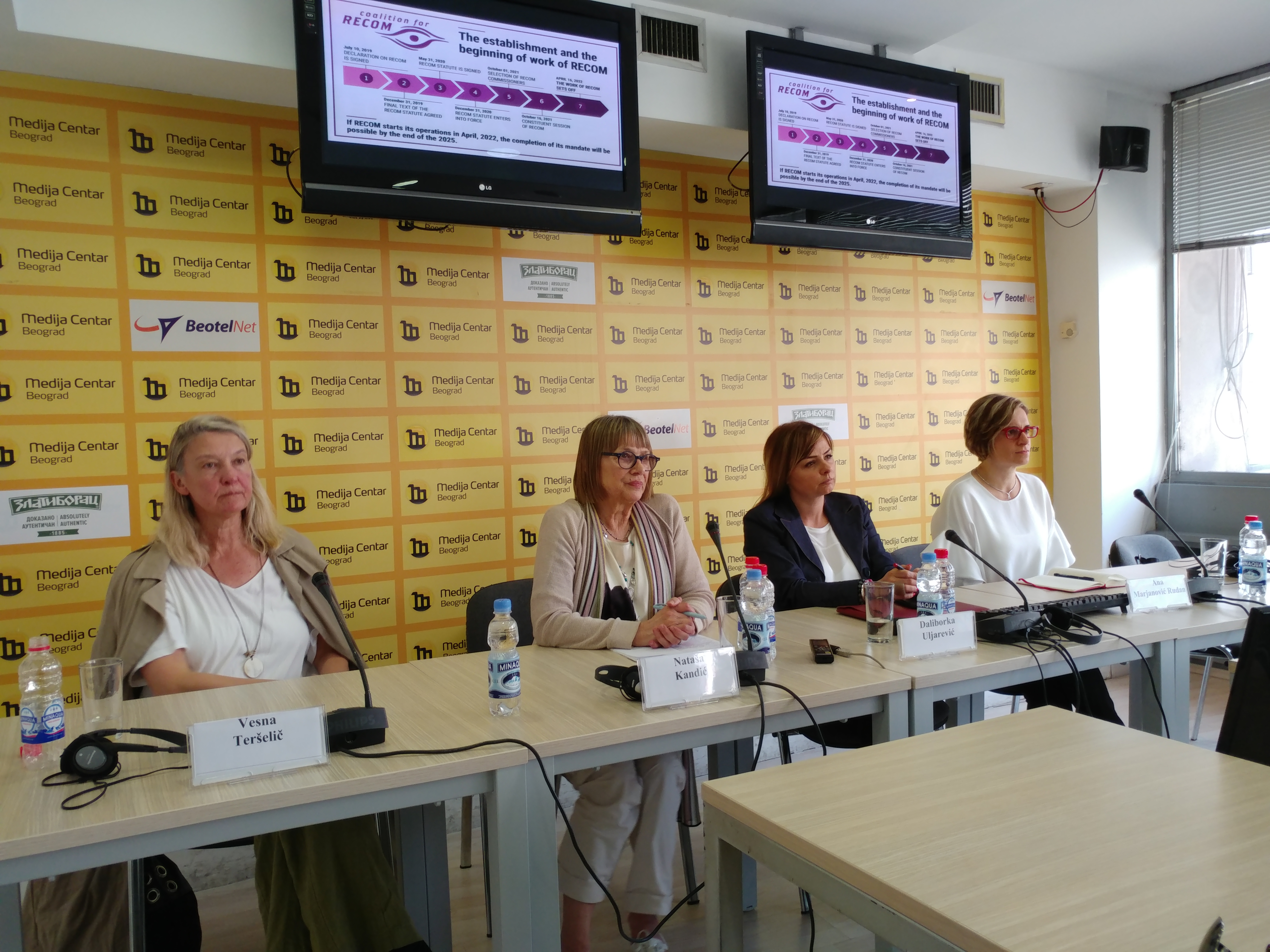
Conference "Roadmap for RECOM and Strengthening the Regional Reconciliation Network" in Belgrade on May 23, 2018. Left-Right: Vesna Teršelič, Nataša Kandić, Daliborka Uljarević, Ana Marjanović Rudan. The discussion was about initiative to call for leaders of former Yugoslavia to establish RECOM network on the forthcoming London summit within the Berlin Process in July 2018.

The Humanitarian Law Center advocates a regional approach to transitional justice in the Western Balkans. Documenting and prosecuting war crimes in the countries affected by the conflicts of the former Yugoslavia involves obtaining information from other countries as perpetrators, victims and witnesses often live on opposite sides of national frontiers.

At the First Regional Forum on Transitional Justice in Sarajevo in May 2006 HLC and other human rights NGOs launched a joint initiative to establish a Regional Commission to determine and disclose the facts about war crimes committed in the former Yugoslavia (RECOM). Regional consultations involving young people, artists, media, human rights NGOs, victims, associations of victims and associations of war veterans took place between May 2006 and October 2008 across the Western Balkans and two more Regional Forums were held in Zagreb and Belgrade. At the Fourth Regional Forum held in October 2008 in Pristina, Kosovo, more than 100 organizations and individuals, including victims and victim associations from Bosnia and Herzegovina, Croatia, Kosovo, Montenegro and Serbia and associations of citizens, human rights NGOs, media associations, and other civil society groups from across the region came together to form the Regional Coalition for RECOM (today RECOM Reconciliation Network).

The Regional Network is carrying out consultations with civil society about RECOM's mandate and character and working to develop a model structure for RECOM. It is campaigning to collect one million signatures supporting the establishment of RECOM and calling on national governments in the region to support the establishment of RECOM.

In August/September 2010 RECOM representatives held meetings with the Croatian president Ivo Josipović and Serbian president Boris Tadić who expressed their support and enthusiasm for the initiative.

== Achievements ==
In March 2009, former members of the 37th Special Police Unit (PJP) of the Ministry of the Interior of the Republic of Serbia (MUP Serbia) were arrested on the basis of information and evidence acquired by HLC about the unit's participation in large-scale war crimes in Kosovo. In May 2008, HLC filed criminal charges against Božidar Delić, a retired Major General of the Yugoslav Army, current deputy speaker of the Serbian National Assembly and senior official of the Serbian Radical Party, and another ten members of the Yugoslav Army relating to the massacre at Trnje/Termje, Kosovo, on 25 March 1999, in which members of the 549th Motorised Brigade under Delić's command killed 42 Albanian civilians, including children, women, and elderly people. In April 2008 the submission of evidence by HLC about war crimes committed in Lovas, Croatia, led to the Belgrade War Crimes Chamber began the trial of 14 indictees for their alleged role in the killing of 70 Croatian civilians in the first war crimes trial of former Yugoslav National Army officers.

In 2007 HLC obtained the opening of an investigation into the murder of 700 Bosniaks in Zvornik in 1992. HLC published the full transcript of the trial of Slobodan Milosevic at the International Criminal Tribunal for the former Yugoslavia (ICTY) in Bosnian/Croatian/Serbian and provided copies to prosecutors offices, courts, judges, and lawyers throughout the Western Balkans in order to facilitate war crimes trials in the region.

In 2006 HLC secured the removal from office of the Head of the Serbian Police War Crimes Investigation Unit and two colleagues who had occupied positions with the Ministry of Interior during the time of the armed conflict in Kosovo, knew or should have known about crimes that were being committed and had failed to prevent or report them.

In 2005 HLC provided the ICTY with the video tape showing members of the Scorpions, a unit of the Serbian Interior Ministry, executing six Muslims from Srebrenica at Trnovo. The release of the tape shocked the Serbian public with its revelation of Serbia's involvement in the war crimes committed at Srebrenica.

In 2004 HLC established its Victim-Witness Support Programme to encourage and support hesitant witnesses testify in war crimes proceedings before the Serbian courts.

== Register of Serbian and Montenegrin victims 1991–1995 ==
In January 2009 began to research and compile a register of individual citizens of Serbia and Montenegro who were killed or disappeared during the armed conflicts in Slovenia (1991), Croatia (1991–1995) and Bosnia and Herzegovina (1992–1995) with the aim of creating an objective record of the Serbian and Montenegrin victims of the conflicts of 1991–1995 on the territory of the former Socialist Federative Republic of Yugoslavia (SFRJ) that would serve to curb attempts at historical revisionism and manipulative use of the numbers of victims.

The register is based on analysis of documents including newspaper reports from the period, publications, court documents (ICTY and regional courts), associations of veterans and families of the dead, etc. and interviews with eyewitnesses or family members of individuals who lost their lives. By the end of 2010 HLC researchers had interviewed a total of 411 witnesses and family members and analysed 5,381 documents and from these sources had compiled a list of 2,028 citizens of Serbia and Montenegro who were killed or disappeared in the wars of the former Yugoslavia between 1991 and 1995.

== Kosovo Memory Book ==
As part of its work of researching war crimes and human rights violations in Kosovo, HLC has compiled its Kosovo Memory Book. This is a record of all individual victims of the conflict between 1 January 1998 and 31 December 2000, documenting the circumstances in which each of the victims was killed or disappeared. The object is to prevent political manipulation of the number of victims, help society confront the reality of the atrocities committed during the conflict, and build a culture of remembrance.

As of 16 October 2008 HLC had recorded 13,472 victims in Kosovo between 1998 and 2000. The victims included 9,260 Albanians, 2,488 Serbs, 470 members of other ethnicities, and 1,254 had not been identified. Information concerning 8,879 of the victims had been fully processed, including details of the circumstances of death or disappearance. All had been living in Kosovo between January 1998 and December 2000. Of the 4,593 victims still to be fully processed, 1,666 were Serbs (686 members of the army or police, 590 civilians and 390 of unknown status), 1,553 ethnic Albanians and 120 members of other ethnic communities; the ethnicity of the remaining 1,254 victims was still unconfirmed. HLC repudiated media reports that 12,000 Serb victims had been registered.

HLC had been provided with information by the Serbian Missing Persons Commission and in September 2008 the Serbian Ministry of Defence provided information about army members who disappeared or were killed in Kosovo. However the Interior Ministry had been unwilling to provide information about murdered or missing police officers.

HLC had initially estimated that 8,000–10,000 Albanians were killed and 2,000–2,500 Serbs, Roma, Bosniaks and other non-Albanians during the Kosovo conflict. As of 22 May 2009, the International Committee of Red Cross recorded 1,906 individuals from all ethnic groups who were still considered missing.

Teams of researchers have conducted research in Kosovo and Serbia, interviewing witnesses, family members and other persons with knowledge of the circumstances in which victims disappeared or were killed and collecting documents and photographs of victims, graves, monuments etc. The research findings are analysed and used to add to or update the records in the war crimes database.

From 1 September 2007 until 31 August 2009, 4,874 records were created documenting the fate of 8,752 victims. The total number of victims recorded in HLC's database of victims is 13,790, including 3,562 victims of documented mass crimes. To date HLC recorded and described the fate of 7,636 Albanians, 845 Serbs, 109 Roma, 64 Bosniaks, 34 Montenegrins, 22 Ashkali, six Gorani, 13 Kosovo Egyptians, six Turks, two Russians, one Croat, two Hungarians, one Macedonian, one Bulgarian, one Ruthenian, two Slovenians, one Yugoslav, and six victims of undetermined nationality.

== Nomination to the Nobel Prize ==
American Congressmen Roger Wicker and Eliot Engel nominated the HLC together with Nataša Kandić for the Nobel Peace Prize in 2018. After the nomination, Nataša Kandić and the HLC were a target of a hatred campaign, organized by Serbian far-right group Serbian Party Oathkeepers, who painted buildings in Belgrade, calling Kandić a traitor of people. Many Serbian mass media, controlled by the government, also published articles with accusations towards Nataša Kandić in treason. Kandić herself expressed surprise at the nomination, saying that human rights work in the countries of the former Yugoslavia is moving very hard, so they feel oppressed and confused by this nomination.

== CEO ==
#	Picture	Name	Mandate	
1		Nataša Kandić (born 1946)	1992	2012
2		Sandra Orlović (born 1980)	2012	2016
3		Milica Kostić	2016	2019
3		Nemanja Stjepanović	2016	2019
3		Budimir Ivanišević	2016	2019
4		Ivana Žanić	2019	2023
5		Nenad Golčevski	2023	2025
6		Jasmina Lazović	2025	Present

== Supporters ==
Supporters of the work of Humanitarian Law Center include George Soros's Open Society Institute. Among HLC's other current sources of funding is a grant from the Sigrid Rausing Trust.

== Bibliography ==
=== Publications (selected) ===
- Kljaić, M 2021, Report on War Crimes Trials in Serbia during 2020, 1st edn, ed. Žanić, I, Humanitarian Law Center, Instant System, Belgrade. Retrieved November 4, 2021, http://hlc-rdc.org/wp-content/uploads/2021/05/Report_on_War_Crimes_Trials_in_Serbia_during_2020.pdf
- Humanitarian Law Center 2021, Memory Politics of the 1990s Wars in Serbia: Historical Revisionism and Challenges of Memory Activism, Belgrade. Retrieved November 4, 2021, https://www.hlc-rdc.org/wp-content/uploads/2021/10/Politika_secanja_en.pdf

=== Books ===
- Humanitarian Law Center 1996, Spotlight on Law Enforcement Abuses in Serbia and Montenegro, 1st edn, ed. Kandić, N, Eng ed. Udovički, K, trans. Stanimirović, D, Udovički, K, Belgrade. ISBN 978-8-6825-9908-1
- Fond za humanitarno pravo 2001, Hague Tribunal III: International Tribunal for the Prosecution of Persons Responsible for Serious Violations of International Humanitarian Law Committed in the Territory of the Former Yugoslavia since 1991, Beograd. ISBN 978-8-6825-9931-9
- Humanitarian Law Center 2011, The Kosovo Memory Book, vol. 1. ISBN 978-8-6793-2039-1
