= Branislav Blažić =

Serbian surgeon and politician (1957–2020)

- Бранислав Блажић

Minister of Environmental Protection
- In office 24 March 1998 – 24 October 2000
- Prime Minister: Mirko Marjanović
- Preceded by: Jordan Aleksić
- Succeeded by: Mila Rosić

Personal details
- Born: 1 April 1957 Kikinda, PR Serbia, Yugoslavia
- Died: 1 April 2020 (aged 63) Belgrade, Serbia
- Cause of death: Infection induced by COVID-19
- Party: Serbian Radical Party (1992–2008); Serbian Progressive Party (2008–2020)
- Children: 3
- Education: Medicine
- Alma mater: University of Belgrade
- Occupation: Surgeon, politician

Branislav Blažić (Serbian Cyrillic: Бранислав Блажић; 1 April 1957 – 1 April 2020) was a Serbian surgeon and politician. He served several terms in the assemblies of FR Yugoslavia, Serbia, and Vojvodina, and was Minister of Environmental Protection in the Government of Serbia from 1998 to 2000. Formerly a prominent figure in the far-right Serbian Radical Party, Blažić was a member of the Serbian Progressive Party from its formation in 2008 until his death.

On 6 October 2017, Blažić was appointed as a state secretary in Serbia's Ministry of Environmental Protection. He died of a COVID-19 infection on 1 April 2020, his sixty-third birthday.

== Early life and private career ==
Blažić was born in Kikinda, Vojvodina, in what was then the People's Republic of Serbia in the Federal People's Republic of Yugoslavia. He graduated from the University of Belgrade Faculty of Medicine, specializing in general surgery.

== Political career ==
=== Yugoslav parliamentarian ===
Blažić was elected to the Assembly of the Federal Republic of Yugoslavia's Chamber of Citizens in the May 1992 federal election, winning a single-member constituency seat in Kikinda. He was re-elected to a second term in the December 1992 election and to a third term in the 1996 election, both of which were held under a system of proportional representation. Blažić was an opposition deputy in parliament until his appointment to cabinet. He was identified in a July 1999 news report as a member of the Radical Party's presidency.

=== Cabinet minister in the Government of Serbia ===
The Radical Party joined a coalition government led by the Socialist Party of Serbia on 24 March 1998, and Blažić was appointed as environment minister in the government of Serbian prime minister Mirko Marjanović.

During the early stages of the North Atlantic Treaty Organization (NATO)'s 1999 bombing of Yugoslavia, Blažić argued that the American-led coalition was targeting chemical industry facilities "in an obvious attempt to cause an environmental disaster." He later accused NATO of using chemical and radioactive weapons against Yugoslavia in breach of international conventions, adding that what he described as NATO's "carpet bombing" of Kosovo and Metohija raised the question of whether the military alliance actually wanted Albanian refugees to return to the area as it claimed. At one press conference, Blažić accused NATO of violating international conventions pertaining to oil pollution, benzol poisoning, prevention of risk of cancer, cross-border air pollution, ozone layer protection, protection of the flora and fauna, and protection of workers from occupational hazards. Following the conclusion of the bombing campaign, he suggested that the smoke and toxic fumes caused by NATO's actions might have contributed to the heavy rainstorms and other bad weather affecting Serbia in the summer of 1999.

In early 2000, a cyanide leak originating in Romania caused significant damage to the Tisza and Danube rivers within Serbia. During a survey of the areas, Blažić remarked, "The Tisza has been killed. Not even bacteria have survived. This is a total catastrophe." He was also quoted as saying, "Had we from Yugoslavia done something like this, we probably would have been bombed." He threatened legal action against Romania and said it would take at least five years for life in the river to recover.

His tenure in cabinet came to an end on 24 October 2000 with the fall of Yugoslav president Slobodan Milošević. Blažić was defeated in his bid for re-election in the 2000 Yugoslavian parliamentary election when the Radical Party failed to win any mandates in his division.

=== Radical Party member of the National Assembly ===
Blažić received the twenty-fifth position on the Radical Party's electoral list for the 2000 Serbian parliamentary election, in which the entire country was counted as a single constituency under a system of proportional representation. The party won twenty-three seats, and Blažić was included in its parliamentary delegation. (From 2000 to 2011, Serbian parliamentary mandates were awarded to sponsoring parties or coalitions rather than to individual candidates, and it was common practice for mandates to be awarded out of numerical order.) He received the twenty-ninth position on the Radical Party's list in the 2003 election and was again included in its delegation in the parliament that followed. The Radical Party served in opposition throughout this period.

He appeared on the Radical Party's lists for the 2007 and 2008 elections but did not take a parliamentary mandate on either occasion.

=== Provincial and municipal politics ===
Blažić was elected to the Assembly of Vojvodina for Kikinda's fourth division in the 1996 Vojvodina provincial election. He was not re-elected in 2000 but was returned for Kikinda's first seat in 2004 and served a second term.

Blažić also served as mayor of Kikinda from 2004 to 2008. During his term, Novi Sad mayor Maja Gojković, also a Radical Party member at the time, described him as one of the country's most competent politicians at the local level.

In 2005, he said that Serbian activist Nataša Kandić would be persona non grata in Kikinda on the grounds that she was "fomenting an anti-Serb hysteria" by accusing Tomislav Nikolić of responsibility for war crimes in Croatia in 1991.

=== Progressive Party member of the National Assembly ===
The Radical Party split in 2008, and several prominent party members joined the breakaway Serbian Progressive Party under Tomislav Nikolić's leadership. Blažić sided with Nikolić and joined the new party.

Serbia's electoral system was reformed in 2011, such that parliamentary mandates were awarded in numerical order to candidates on successful lists. Blažić received the twenty-ninth position on the Progressive Party's Let's Get Serbia Moving coalition list in the 2012 parliamentary election and was returned to the assembly when the list won seventy-three mandates. The Progressive Party became the leading force in Serbia's coalition government after the election, and Blažić served as a member of its parliamentary majority. He was re-elected in 2014, in which the Progressives won a landslide victory, after receiving the same list position.

In late 2014, Blažić and fellow MP Vladimir Đukanović went on an unauthorized mission to act as international observers for elections in the breakaway Donetsk and Luhansk People's Republics in Ukraine. This caused some diplomatic embarrassment for the Serbian government. Đukanović said that he and Blažić went on the mission as private citizens.

Blažić received a slightly lower position on the Progressive Party's coalition electoral list in the 2016 election, but he was still returned without difficulty when the list won a second consecutive majority. In the parliament that followed, he chaired the environmental protection committee and was a member of the health and family committee; a deputy member of the defence and internal affairs committee; and a member of the parliamentary friendship groups with Austria, Belarus, Germany, Kazakhstan, Russia, Switzerland, and the countries of Sub-Saharan Africa.

Blažić was named as a deputy member of Serbia's delegation to the NATO Parliamentary Assembly (where Serbia has associate status) in 2012. He became a full member in 2014 and served until 2016. In June 2016, he indicated that Serbia wanted to be a force for stability in the Balkans but would remain militarily neutral and not become a member of NATO.

He resigned from the assembly on 10 October 2017, after being appointed as a state secretary in Serbia's ministry of environmental protection. He continued to serve in this role until his death in 2020.

== Electoral record ==
=== Provincial (Vojvodina) ===
2008 Vojvodina assembly election Kikinda II (constituency seat) - First and Second Rounds
Savo Dobranić (incumbent)	For a European Vojvodina: Democratic Party–G17 Plus, Boris Tadić (Affiliation: Democratic Party)	5,177	28.77	6,722	58.11
Branislav Blažić (incumbent for Kikinda I)	Serbian Radical Party	7,054	39.20	4,846	41.89
Đura Duja Šibul	Together for Vojvodina–Nenad Čanak	1,750	9.72		
Gordana Aleksić	Hungarian Coalition–István Pásztor	1,490	8.28		
Siniša Odadžin	Liberal Democratic Party	991	5.51		
Dragan Pakaški	Socialist Party of Serbia (SPS)–Party of United Pensioners of Serbia (PUPS) (Affiliation: Socialist Party)	981	5.45		
Miodrag Čeleketić	Democratic Party of Serbia–New Serbia–Vojislav Koštunica	554	3.08		
Total valid votes		17,997	100	11,568	100
Invalid ballots		500		217	
Total votes casts		18,497	64.30	11,785	40.97

2004 Vojvodina assembly election Kikinda I (constituency seat) - First and Second Rounds
Branislav Blažić	Serbian Radical Party	4,578	44.64	5,877	64.17
Vlado Krejić	Democratic Party	1,507	14.70	3,281	35.83
Dragan Rankov	Coalition: Together for Vojvodina - Nenad Čanak	1,213	11.83		
Stevan Grbić	Socialist Party of Serbia	818	7.98		
Gordana Aleksić	G17 Plus	789	7.69		
Svetozar Tatić	Strength of Serbia Movement	593	5.78		
Đorđe Lujinović	Democratic Party of Serbia	383	3.73		
Luka Gašić	Coalition: To Live Normally	374	3.65		
Total valid votes		10,255	100	9,158	100
Invalid ballots		533		222	
Total votes casts		10,788	43.07	9,380	37.45

2000 Vojvodina assembly election Kikinda II (constituency seat)
Candidate	Party or Coalition	Result
Paja Francuski (incumbent)	Democratic Opposition of Serbia (Affiliation: League of Social Democrats of Vojvodina)	elected
Branislav Blažić (incumbent for Kikinda IV)	Serbian Radical Party	
other candidates		

=== Federal (Federal Republic of Yugoslavia) ===
May 1992 Yugoslavian Federal Election Chamber of Citizens: Kikinda
Branislav Blažić	Serbian Radical Party	20,067	27.10
Balint Antal	Democratic Fellowship of Vojvodina Hungarians	18,868	25.48
Rajko Popović	Socialist Party of Serbia	12,336	16.66
Jandrija Lukač	League of Communists – Movement for Yugoslavia	4,258	5.75
Ivan Glavaški	Citizens' Group	4,099	5.54
Mirko Knežević	Citizens' Group	3,563	4.81
Branislav Knežević	Citizens' Group	2,890	3.90
Đuro Popeskov	Citizens' Group	2,359	3.19
Milan Ivošević	People's Party	2,143	2.89
Mikloš Maroti	Citizens' Group	1,963	2.65
Rudolf Cegledi	Citizens' Group	1,501	2.03
Total valid votes		74,047	100
