= Documenta – Center for Dealing with the Past =

- Formation: 2004; 22 years ago
- Type: Non-governmental organization
- Headquarters: Zagreb, Croatia
- Coordinator: Tena Banjeglav
- Affiliations: RECOM Reconciliation Network (2006–)
- Website: documenta.hr

Documenta – Center for Dealing with the Past (Croatian: Documenta – Centar za suočavanje s prošlošću) is the Croatian non-governmental organization that encourages the process of dealing with the past by establishing factual truths regarding the wars in Yugoslavia. According to its mission statement, the organization encourages this process by "documenting and investigating prewar, wartime and postwar events and works with organizations of civil society and government institutions, and similar centers abroad"; with a vision of moving Croatia "towards a sustainable peace by dealing with the past."

It was initiated by several Croatian peace and human rights organizations: the Centre for Peace, Non-Violence and Human Rights Osijek, the Centre for Peace Studies in Zagreb, the Civic Committee for Human Rights and the Croatian Helsinki Committee who sought to combat both public silence as well as the falsification of history regarding war crimes in Yugoslavia and the post-Yugoslavian countries. To achieve this aim, the organization focuses on public dialogue and public policies, documenting, and improvement of court practices and standards.

== Coordinators ==
#	Picture	Name	Mandate	
1		Vesna Teršelič (born 1962)	2004	2026
2		Tena Banjeglav	2026	present
