= Adriatik Kelmendi =

Kosovan journalist (born 1978)

- Born: 20 February 1978 (age 48); Peja, Kosovo
- Occupations: Journalist, columnist, writer
- Years active: 1998–present
- Known for: Journalism, political analysis
- Television: Rubikon

Adriatik Kelmendi (born 20 February 1978) is an Kosovan journalist, writer and columnist. He worked as a journalist and columnist for Koha Ditore and Kohavision from 1998 until 2020, and was the host and creator of the political-analytical television program Rubikon.

In 2020, he joined Klan Kosova, bringing the show with him and becoming the station's General Director. He resigned from the position in 2023 amid controversies related to the suspension of Klan Kosova's business certificate.

Kelmendi is also a lecturer at the Faculty of Mass Communication at AAB College.

== Early life and career ==
Adriatik Kelmendi was born on 20 February 1978 in Peja, Kosovo, the son of deputy prosecutor Flamur Kelmendi. At age 16, he anonymously submitted his first article to Koha Ditore (then called Koha Javore). He joined Koha Ditore as culture section editor in 1999, later becoming the responsible editor. Meanwhile, he studied journalism in Tirana and specialized in the United Kingdom.

He began his television career in 2004 as the author and host of the political program Rubikon.

== Selected bibliography ==
- 2001: Kosovo Prostitution Flourishes: UN Struggles to Break Up Lucrative Prostitution Racket; BCR
- 2002: Kosovo: Fuel Smugglers Flourishing; Institute for War and Peace Reporting
- 2013: Kapërcimi i rubikonit drejt pavarësisë; Koha Ditore
- 2015: Gazetari televizive; independent publication
- 2021: Segregation–Growing Up in Kosovo; Comparative Southeast European Studies
- 2020: Smells like teen spirit: vitet 1999-2013; Koha
