= Savo Dobranić =

Politician in Serbia

Savo Dobranić (Serbian Cyrillic: Саво Добранић; born 1964) is a politician in Serbia. He served in the Assembly of Vojvodina from 2004 to 2012 and was the mayor of Kikinda from 2012 to 2013, as a member of the Democratic Party (Demokratska stranka, DS).

== Early life and career ==
Dobranić was born in the village of Rusko Selo in the Kikinda municipality, Autonomous Province of Vojvodina, in what was then the Socialist Republic of Serbia in the Socialist Federal Republic of Yugoslavia. He graduated from the University of Novi Sad Faculty of Law. Dobranić was the director of the Centre for Social Work in Kikinda from 1997 to 2001, the head of Kikinda's secretariat for general administration and budget from 2001 to 2004, and the director of the holding company Dnevnik from 2006 to 2010.

== Politician ==
Dobranić was first elected to the Assembly of Vojvodina in the 2004 provincial election, winning Kikinda's second constituency seat in the second round of voting. The Democratic Party formed a coalition government in the province after the election, and he served as part of its parliamentary majority. He also led the DS electoral list for Kikinda in the concurrent 2004 Serbian local elections and was elected when the list won six mandates. The Serbian Radical Party (Srpska radikalna stranka, SRS) won the election at the local level, and the DS served in opposition.

He was re-elected to the Vojvodina assembly in the 2008 provincial election, in which the DS and its allies won an outright majority, and he again served as a supporter of the administration for the next four years. In 2009, he led a successful campaign to remove fellow DS member Jagoda Tolicki from office as mayor of Kikinda.

Dobranić was somewhat unexpectedly defeated in the first round of voting in the 2012 provincial election, losing much of his support on the centre-left to the eventual winner, Miloš Šibul of the League of Social Democrats of Vojvodina (Liga socijaldemokrata Vojvodine, LSV). Despite losing his provincial seat, he again led the DS's local list for Kikinda in the concurrent 2012 Serbian local elections and was elected when the list won eleven mandates. The elections did not produce a clear winner, but the DS was able to form a coalition government with the Socialist Party of Serbia (Socijalistička partija Srbije, SPS), and Dobranić was chosen as the municipality's mayor. In February 2013, he signed an agreement for the construction of a water treatment plant in the municipality.

His term in office was ultimately brief. There was a shift in the municipality's political forces in September 2013, during which time the SPS withdrew its support from the DS administration. Dobranić was succeeded in office by Pavle Markov of the Serbian Progressive Party (Srpska napredna stranka, SNS).

Dobranić later appeared in the 102nd position on the Democratic Party's list in the 2014 Serbian parliamentary election. The list won only nineteen mandates, and he was not returned.

== Electoral record ==
=== Provincial (Vojvodina) ===
2012 Vojvodina assembly election Kikinda II (constituency seat) - First and Second Rounds
| Miloš Šibul | League of Social Democrats of Vojvodina–Nenad Čanak | 2,644 | 17.38 | 7,741 | 53.81 |
| Svetislav Vukmirica | Let's Get Vojvodina Moving–Tomislav Nikolić (Serbian Progressive Party, New Serbia, Movement of Socialists, Strength of Serbia Movement) (Affiliation: Serbian Progressive Party) | 3,959 | 26.02 | 6,644 | 46.19 |
| Savo Dobranić (incumbent) | Choice for a Better Vojvodina (Affiliation: Democratic Party) | 2,398 | 15.76 | | |
| Gojko Grubor | Socialist Party of Serbia (SPS), Party of United Pensioners of Serbia (PUPS), United Serbia (JS), Social Democratic Party of Serbia (SDP Serbia) (Affiliation: Socialist Party) | 1,284 | 8.44 | | |
| Branislav Bajić | Citizen's Group: Strength of Kikinda | 1,255 | 8.25 | | |
| Paja Francuski | U-Turn | 941 | 6.18 | | |
| Ferenc Lepár | Alliance of Vojvodina Hungarians | 847 | 5.57 | | |
| Karolj Damjanov | United Regions of Serbia–Karolj Damjanov | 811 | 5.33 | | |
| Mladen Koprivica | Democratic Party of Serbia | 556 | 3.65 | | |
| Nikola Jankov | Serbian Radical Party | 520 | 3.42 | | |
| Total valid votes | | 15,215 | 100 | 14,385 | 100 |

2008 Vojvodina assembly election Kikinda II (constituency seat) - First and Second Rounds
| Savo Dobranić (incumbent) | For a European Vojvodina: Democratic Party–G17 Plus, Boris Tadić (Affiliation: Democratic Party) | 5,177 | 28.77 | 6,722 | 58.11 |
| Branislav Blažić (incumbent for Kikinda I) | Serbian Radical Party | 7,054 | 39.20 | 4,846 | 41.89 |
| Đura Duja Šibul | Together for Vojvodina–Nenad Čanak | 1,750 | 9.72 | | |
| Gordana Aleksić | Hungarian Coalition–István Pásztor | 1,490 | 8.28 | | |
| Siniša Odadžin | Liberal Democratic Party | 991 | 5.51 | | |
| Dragan Pakaški | Socialist Party of Serbia (SPS)–Party of United Pensioners of Serbia (PUPS) (Affiliation: Socialist Party) | 981 | 5.45 | | |
| Miodrag Čeleketić | Democratic Party of Serbia–New Serbia–Vojislav Koštunica | 554 | 3.08 | | |
| Total valid votes | | 17,997 | 100 | 11,568 | 100 |
| Invalid ballots | | 500 | | 217 | |
| Total votes casts | | 18,497 | 64.30 | 11,785 | 40.97 |

2004 Vojvodina assembly election Kikinda II (constituency seat) - First and Second Rounds
| Savo Dobranić | Democratic Party | 2,485 | 20.09 | 6,050 | 51.02 |
| Blagoje Krajinović | Serbian Radical Party | 3,134 | 25.33 | 5,809 | 48.98 |
| Paja Francuski (incumbent) | Coalition: Together for Vojvodina–Nenad Čanak (Affiliation: League of Social Democrats of Vojvodina) | 1,718 | 13.89 | | |
| Prim. Dr. Dragan Pakaški | Socialist Party of Serbia | 1,600 | 12.93 | | |
| Dr. Mirko Stojisavljević | Strength of Serbia Movement | 890 | 7.19 | | |
| Dr. Milica Sudarov | Democratic Party of Serbia | 820 | 6.63 | | |
| Dr. Đura Radin | G17 Plus | 789 | 6.38 | | |
| Slavica Tatomir | Coalition: DA–SDP–Dr. Nebojša Čović | 493 | 3.99 | | |
| Milan Stanković | Coalition for Kikinda (SPO–NS) | 442 | 3.57 | | |
| Total valid votes | | 12,371 | 100 | 11,859 | 100 |
| Invalid ballots | | 690 | | 436 | |
| Total votes casts | | 13,061 | 44.55 | 12,295 | 41.94 |
