= Svetlana Slapšak =

Slovenian anthropologist and historian (born 1948)

Svetlana Slapšak Светлана Слапшак
- Born: January 18, 1948 (age 78); Belgrade, Yugoslavia
- Occupations: Anthropologist, historian

Svetlana Slapšak (Serbo-Croatian Cyrillic: Светлана Слапшак; born 18 January 1948) is a Serbian born Slovenian anthropologist, classical philologist, writer, and historian. She has authored the books Svi Grci nazad! : eseji o helenizmu u novijoj srpskoj književnost (1985), Ogledi o bezbrižnosti : srpski intelektualci, nacionalizam i jugoslovenski rat (1994), Leon in Leonina ali Zgodba o vztrajnosti (1997), Ženske ikone antičkog sveta (2006), Zelje in spolnost : iz zgodovinske antropologije hrane : študija o kultni, ritualni in kulturni vlogi zelja (2013), and Antička miturgija : žene (2013). She was nominated for the Nobel Peace Prize in 2005.

In 2017, Slapšak has signed the Declaration on the Common Language of the Croats, Serbs, Bosniaks and Montenegrins.
