= Paja Francuski =

Serbian politician

Paja Francuski (Serbian Cyrillic: Паја Француски; 1949–25 March 2023) is a politician in Serbia. He was the mayor of Kikinda from 1996 to 2000, served in the Assembly of Vojvodina from 1997 to 2004, and was a member of the Executive Council of Vojvodina from 2000 to 2004. During his time as an elected official, Francuski was a member of the League of Social Democrats of Vojvodina (LSV).

== Early life and private career ==
Francuski was born in Kikinda in the Autonomous Province of Vojvodina, in what was then the People's Republic of Serbia in the Federal People's Republic of Yugoslavia. He graduated from the University of Belgrade Faculty of Mining and Geology and worked at Naftna Industrija Srbije.

== Politician ==
=== During the Milošević years (1992–2000) ===
Francuski was first elected to the Kikinda municipal assembly in the December 1992 Serbian local elections.

In 1996, the LSV formed an alliance known as the Vojvodina Coalition (KV) with two other regional parties. This coalition won a plurality victory in Kikinda in the 1996 local elections and, in conjunction with the mostly supportive Zajedno (English: Together) coalition, controlled a majority of seats in the assembly. Francuski was re-elected to the assembly and, when it convened, was chosen as its president (i.e., speaker). At the time, this position was equivalent to that of mayor.

Francuski was also elected for Kikinda's second division as a Vojvodina Coalition candidate in the concurrent 1996 Vojvodina provincial election and was sworn in when the assembly convened in early 1997. The election was won by the Socialist Party of Serbia (SPS), and Francuski served in opposition.

The LSV left the Vojvodina Coalition in 1998. Over the next two years, Francuski emerged as a prominent local opponent of Slobodan Milošević's government. In September 1999, he attended a meeting of the Socialist International's committee on local authorities with another member of the Serbian opposition.

=== The fall of Milošević and after (2000–12) ===
The LSV joined the Democratic Opposition of Serbia (DOS), a broad and ideologically diverse coalition of parties opposed to Milošević's government, in 2000. The DOS defeated Milošević in the 2000 Yugoslavian general election, an event that prompted wide-scale changes in Serbian politics.

Francuski was re-elected for Kikinda's second division as a DOS candidate in the 2000 provincial election and was also re-elected to the Kikinda municipal assembly in the concurrent 2000 local elections. The DOS won majority victories at both levels of government. When the provincial assembly convened, Francuski was appointed as one of the vice-presidents of Vojvodina's executive council. He served in this capacity until 2002, when he was re-assigned as the provincial secretary for energy and minerals. In the latter role, he took part in discussions about forming a public company for natural gas distribution in the province; in September 2003, he had to announce that this plan was being abandoned, as there were no viable options to provide a stable, safe, and cheap supply to consumers. The following year, he complained that relations between the republican and provincial energy ministries were not satisfactory.

The DOS coalition had dissolved by 2004, and the LSV contested that year's provincial election in its own Together for Vojvodina (ZZV) coalition. Francuski sought re-election in Kikinda's second division and was defeated. He stood down from the executive council shortly after the election.

Francuski briefly returned to political life in 2012 as a member of the Preokret (English: U-Turn) coalition. He sought re-election to the provincial assembly in his old constituency for the 2012 provincial election and was defeated. He also appeared in the third position on the U-Turn list for Kikinda in the 2012 local elections; the list did not cross the electoral threshold to win any mandates.

Francuski died on 25 March 2023 after a short and serious illness.

== Electoral record ==
=== Provincial (Vojvodina) ===
2012 Vojvodina assembly election Kikinda II (constituency seat) - First and Second Rounds
Miloš Šibul	League of Social Democrats of Vojvodina–Nenad Čanak	2,644	17.38	7,741	53.81
Svetislav Vukmirica	Let's Get Vojvodina Moving–Tomislav Nikolić (Serbian Progressive Party, New Serbia, Movement of Socialists, Strength of Serbia Movement) (Affiliation: Serbian Progressive Party)	3,959	26.02	6,644	46.19
Savo Dobranić (incumbent)	Choice for a Better Vojvodina (Affiliation: Democratic Party)	2,398	15.76		
Gojko Grubor	Socialist Party of Serbia (SPS), Party of United Pensioners of Serbia (PUPS), United Serbia (JS), Social Democratic Party of Serbia (SDP Serbia) (Affiliation: Socialist Party)	1,284	8.44		
Branislav Bajić	Citizen's Group: Strength of Kikinda	1,255	8.25		
Paja Francuski	U-Turn	941	6.18		
Ferenc Lepár	Alliance of Vojvodina Hungarians	847	5.57		
Karolj Damjanov	United Regions of Serbia–Karolj Damjanov	811	5.33		
Mladen Koprivica	Democratic Party of Serbia	556	3.65		
Nikola Jankov	Serbian Radical Party	520	3.42		
Total valid votes		15,215	100	14,385	100

2004 Vojvodina assembly election Kikinda II (constituency seat) - First and Second Rounds
Savo Dobranić	Democratic Party	2,485	20.09	6,050	51.02
Blagoje Krajinović	Serbian Radical Party	3,134	25.33	5,809	48.98
Paja Francuski (incumbent)	Coalition: Together for Vojvodina–Nenad Čanak (Affiliation: League of Social Democrats of Vojvodina)	1,718	13.89		
Prim. Dr. Dragan Pakaški	Socialist Party of Serbia	1,600	12.93		
Dr. Mirko Stojisavljević	Strength of Serbia Movement	890	7.19		
Dr. Milica Sudarov	Democratic Party of Serbia	820	6.63		
Dr. Đura Radin	G17 Plus	789	6.38		
Slavica Tatomir	Coalition: DA–SDP–Dr. Nebojša Čović	493	3.99		
Milan Stanković	Coalition for Kikinda (SPO–NS)	442	3.57		
Total valid votes		12,371	100	11,859	100
Invalid ballots		690		436	
Total votes casts		13,061	44.55	12,295	41.94

2000 Vojvodina assembly election Kikinda II (constituency seat)
Candidate	Party or Coalition	Result
Paja Francuski (incumbent)	Democratic Opposition of Serbia (Affiliation: League of Social Democrats of Vojvodina)	elected
Branislav Blažić (incumbent for Kikinda IV)	Serbian Radical Party	
other candidates		

1996 Vojvodina assembly election Kikinda II (constituency seat)
Candidate	Party or Coalition	Result
Paja Francuski	Alliance of Vojvodina Hungarians	elected
other candidates		
