= Vesna Teršelič =

Croatian peace activist (born 1962)

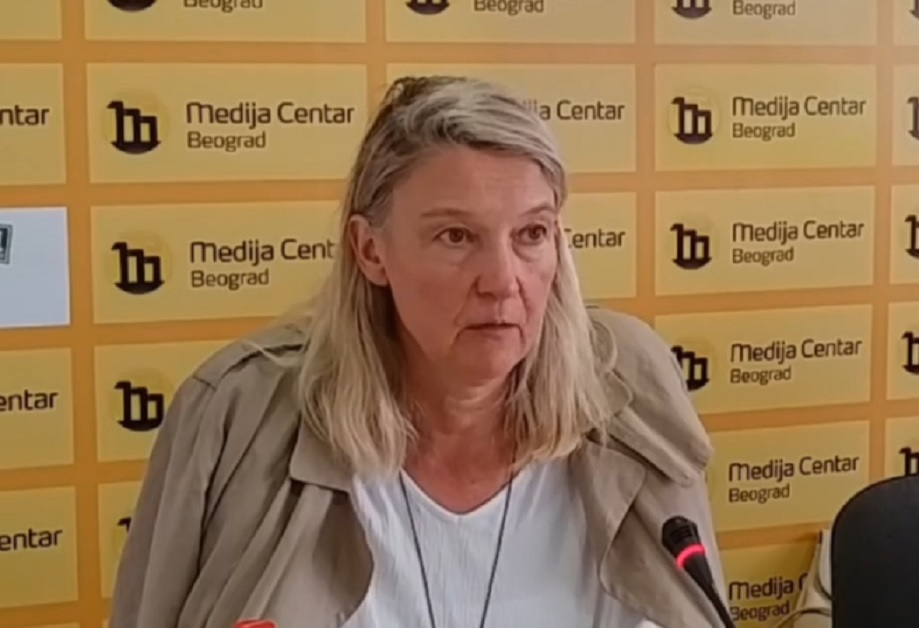
- Teršelič in 2018
- Born: 1962 (age 63–64); Ljubljana, Yugoslavia
- Occupation: Peace activist
- Organization(s): Documenta (2004–2026)

Vesna Teršelič (born in 1962) is a Slovene-born Croatian peace activist who founded the Anti-War Campaign of Croatia. From 2004 to 2026 she was the coordinator of Documenta - Center for Dealing with the Past.

== Biography ==
Teršelič, an ethnic Slovene born in Ljubljana, lives in Zagreb, where she works as a peace activist.

Vesna Teršelič, together with other her friends, organized the Croatian Anti-War Campaign in 1991 to prevent war conflicts on the territories of the former Yugoslavia. As Teršelič said: "We initiated the anti-war [campaign] on July 4, 1991, which means that we did it too late, because the whole previous year... passed in hope that surely the politicians were doing something in order to reach an agreement in a diplomatic way, reaching a new form of arrangement between Croats and Serbs in Croatia." They also launched the magazine Arkzin in September 1991 to campaign for peace and research war conflict aspects.

In 1998, she was joint recipient of the Right Livelihood Award along with Katarina Kruhonja of the Centre for Peace, Non-violence and Human Rights, Osijek.

From 2004 to 2026 she was coordinator of Documenta - Center for Dealing with the Past. She is one of the founders of the Initiative for RECOM, a member of the Regional Council of the RECOM Reconciliation Network (RMP) from Croatia. In 2017, Teršelič signed the Declaration on the Common Language of the Croats, Serbs, Bosniaks and Montenegrins.

Preceded by Position created	Coordinator of Documenta; 2004–2026	Succeeded by Tena Banjeglav
