= Nataša Kandić =

Serbian human rights activist (born 1946)

Nataša Kandić Наташа Кандић
- Kandić in 2018
- Born: 16 December 1946 (age 79); Kragujevac, Yugoslavia
- Education: University of Belgrade
- Occupations: Human rights activist; sociologist
- Organization: HLC (1992–present)

Nataša Kandić (Serbo-Croatian Cyrillic: Наташа Кандић; born 16 December 1946) is a Serbian human rights activist and sociologist who is best known as the founder and ex-CEO of the Humanitarian Law Center (HLC), an organization campaigning for human rights and reconciliation in the former Yugoslavia, focusing on the Serbian role in the conflict.

Formed in 1992, the HLC's research was integral to the war crimes prosecutions of the International Criminal Tribunal for the Former Yugoslavia (ICTY), particularly the "smoking gun" video linking Serbian military forces to the Srebrenica massacres. She has won numerous international awards for her human rights work (Amnesty International's Objective Observer Award, among others). Kandić is a figure of controversy in Serbia where she was the subject of a defamation lawsuit by former President of Serbia Tomislav Nikolić.

== Career ==
=== Humanitarian Law Center ===
Kandić is a sociologist by training. In 1992, she founded and became executive director of the Humanitarian Law Center in Belgrade, a human rights organization which has been praised for its systematic and impartial investigations of human rights abuses. Since the start of the Yugoslav wars in the early 1990s, she has documented and protested against war crimes committed between 1991 and 1999, including torture, rape, and murder. According to Businessweek, her work drew "the hatred of fellow Serbs and military leaders throughout the region -- and won the admiration of human-rights defenders worldwide".

Throughout the war in Kosovo, she travelled back and forth across Serbia, providing information to the outside world about human rights violations being committed by police and paramilitary groups. She was one of the few Serbian rights activists to continue investigating the Kosovo crisis after the murder of Slavko Ćuruvija and to collaborate with ethnic Albanian activists. She and her staff were anonymously threatened for their work, and their office was spray-painted with a swastika and the message "NATO's spies". In December 1999, HLC lawyer Teki Bokshi was arrested in Kosovo by Serbian police, drawing protest from the HLC and a United Nations envoy.

The evidence she gathered was later used in the preparation of indictments by the International Criminal Court for the Former Yugoslavia in The Hague. She provided a video of Bosnian Serb paramilitaries executing six Bosniak prisoners near Trnovo, used as proof of Serbia's role in the Srebrenica massacre, in which more than 8,000 Bosniak men and boys were killed. Kandić had located a copy of the tape, originally made by the paramilitaries themselves, from a man in Šid, who provided it only on the condition that she not air it until he had safely left the country. Excerpts from the tape were later shown on Serbian and Bosnian television. The Guardian described the tape as the "smoking gun"—"the final, incontrovertible proof of Serbia's part in the Srebrenica massacres"—while The New York Times called the airing of the tape on Serbian television a "watershed" moment for the country. Kandić criticized a 2007 judgement in Serbia as the presiding judge, had described the crime as “killing six men of Muslim origin”, whom "it was not clear came from Srebrenica". Kandić said "This judgment sends a very dangerous message,” further stating, "Both from a moral and factual point of the view, this is not justice".

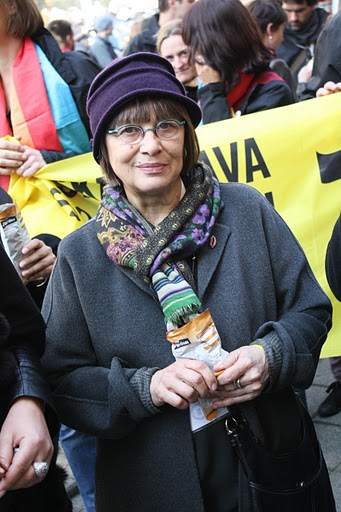
Kandić at Belgrade pride 2010

In 2003, she criticized the deployment of Serbian troops to Afghanistan, stating that the army should first be reformed and war crimes trials concluded.

In 2004, she contributed to the exposure of US journalist Jack Kelley, a USA Today reporter discovered to have fabricated several important stories, when she disputed his account of using her as a source for a July 1999 front-page story on a typed Yugoslav Army order to "cleanse" a village in Kosovo.

=== 2003 Republic Square incident ===
In 2003, Kandić attended a protest rally held on the International Day of the Disappeared in Republic Square in Belgrade, against the lack of information about Kosovo Serbs missing since the 1999 conflict. She was confronted and repeatedly insulted by other attendees who called her a "traitor". After Nikola Popović, an elderly Serb refugee from Kosovo confronted her directly and reportedly manhandled her, she slapped him in the face and yelled back at him. The policemen present took her aside and requested her documents, which she protested saying they should instead request them from other persons. The police later charged her for violent behaviour in public and disobeying the police orders.

The organization representing Serb refugees also filed charges. She justified her actions by asserting she had to "defend [myself] from Serbian patriotism". In July 2005, the First Municipal Court in Belgrade dismissed the private lawsuit against Kandić. The attendees called the presiding judge a "Serb traitor".

=== Defamation lawsuit ===
Kandić was originally found guilty on charges of defamation in February 2009 after her 2006 statements that Tomislav Nikolić killed elderly people in Croatia during the war. She was fined 200,000 Serbian dinars (around 2,000 EUR at the time). International human rights organization Front Line condemned the charges as "part of a campaign aimed at stigmatizing human right defenders and human rights organisations operating in Serbia, portraying them as enemies of the country", and Human Rights Watch named the case as an example of criminal libel laws used as "a tool to silence human rights criticisms." The charges were later overturned on appeal by the Belgrade District Court.

== International recognition ==
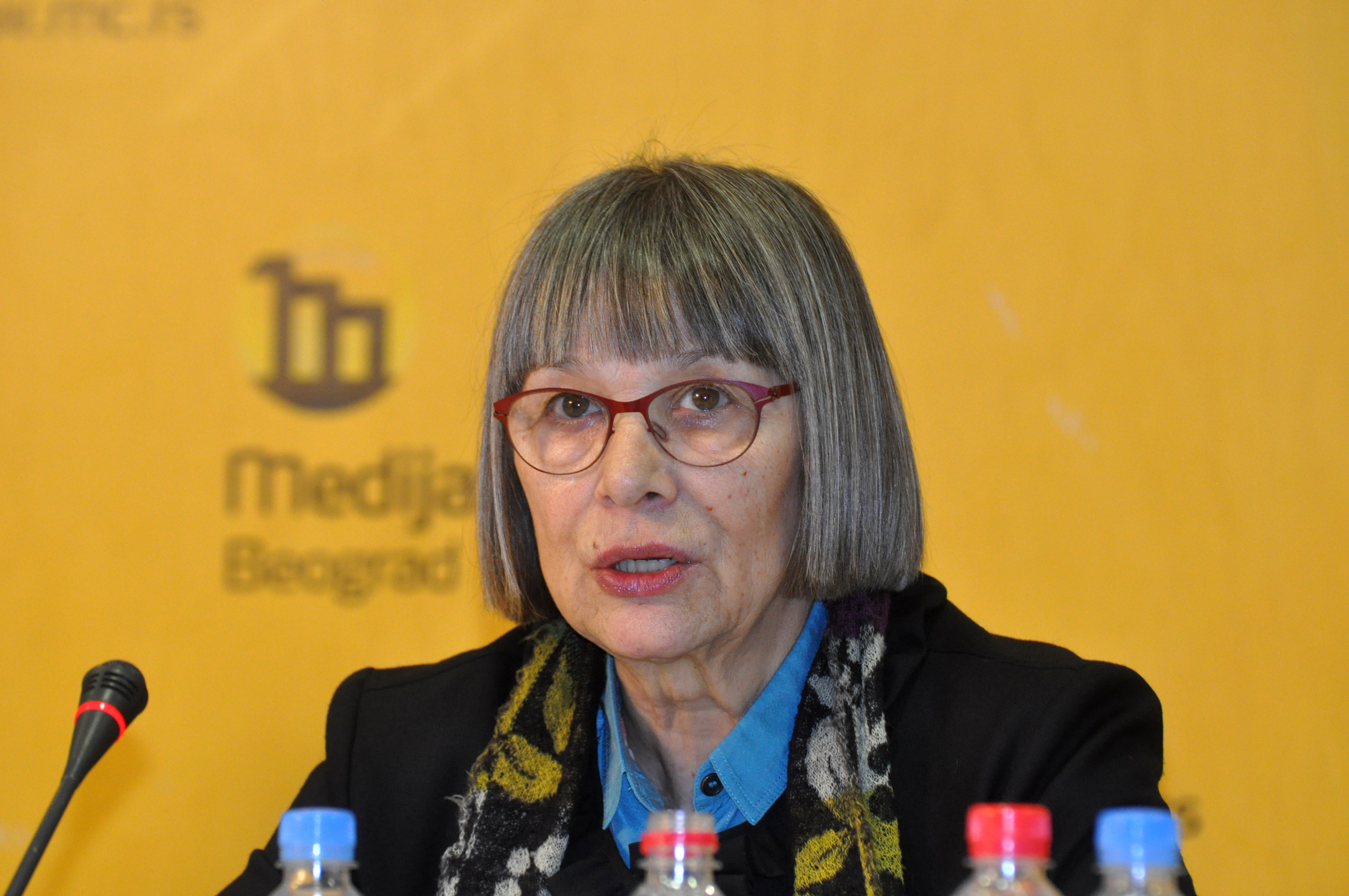
Kandić in 2015

Kandić is a recipient of more than 20 international, regional and national human rights awards. In 2000 she won the Martin Ennals Award for Human Rights Defenders, awarded jointly by Amnesty International, Diakonia, Human Rights Watch, HURIDOCS, International Alert, the International Commission of Jurists, the International Federation for Human Rights, the International Service for Human Rights and the World Organization Against Torture, granted annually to an individual or an organization who has displayed exceptional courage in combating human rights violations.

She was listed by Time as one of its 36 European Heroes in 2003, and again featured as a Time European Hero in 2006. In 2004, the People in Need Foundation awarded Kandić and the HLC its Homo Homini Award, presented by Václav Havel.

In 2005 she was proclaimed an honorary citizen of Sarajevo, and Slobodna Bosna magazine named her Person of the Year in Bosnia and Herzegovina. In September 2006, Kandić was named to the Order of Danica Hrvatska, awarded by the President of Croatia to individuals who have made a significant contribution to the advancement of moral values.

In April 2018, she was honoured for her work with the "Hartën e Artë të Kosovës" ("Golden Map of Kosovo") award by Ramush Haradinaj, at the time Prime Minister of Kosovo and former leader of Kosovo Liberation Army (KLA).

Her awards include the following:

- Human Rights Watch Award (1993)
- US and EU Democracy and Civil Society Award (1998)
- The Martin Ennals Award for Human Rights Defenders (1999)
- Lawyers' Committee for Human Rights Award (1999)
- National Endowment for Democracy Democracy Award (2000)
- Geuzenpenning Award (2000)
- Roger E. Joseph Prize (2000), given by Hebrew Union College–Jewish Institute of Religion
- Alexander Langer Prize (2000)
- Civil Courage Prize (2000)
- Honorable Doctorate of the University of Valencia (2001)
- American Bar Association Rule of Law Award (2003)
- European Heroes Award, Time Magazine (2003)
- Homo Homini Award - People in Need Foundation (2003)
- Honorary Citizen of Sarajevo (4 October 2005)
- Order of Danica Hrvatska (2006)
- Civil Rights Defender of the Year Award, Civil Rights Defenders (2013)
- International Hrant Dink Award (2013)
- Harta e artë e Kosovës (2018)
- BBC's 100 Women list (2023).
- Key to the City of Pristina (2025)

== See also ==
- Sonja Biserko
- Edvin Kanka Ćudić

Preceded by Position created	CEO of Humanitarian Law Center; 1992–2012	Succeeded by Sandra Orlović
Preceded by Position created	Founder of Humanitarina Law Center; 1992–	Incumbent
