= Snježana Kordić =

Croatian linguist

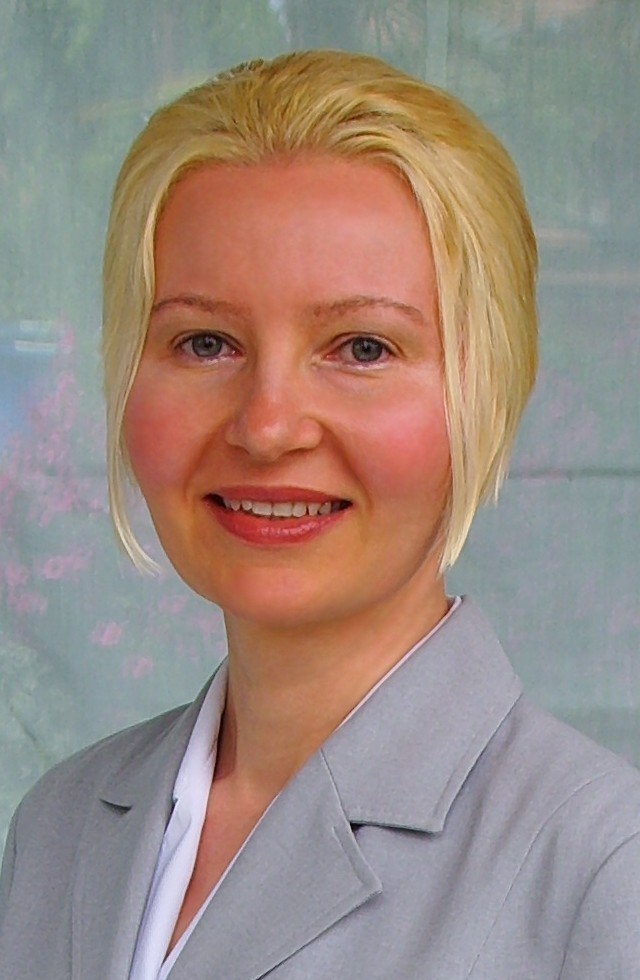
- Kordić in 2010
- Born: 29 October 1964 (age 61); Osijek, SR Croatia, SFR Yugoslavia
- Education: MSci, DPhil (Zagreb), Dr habil. (Münster)
- Alma mater: University of Osijek; University of Zagreb; University of Münster
- Occupation: Linguistics
- Years active: 1990–present
- Employer(s): Joseph George Strossmayer University of Osijek; University of Zagreb; Ruhr-University Bochum; Westphalian Wilhelms-University of Münster; Humboldt University of Berlin; Goethe University Frankfurt am Main
- Notable work: Relativna rečenica (1995); Riječi na granici punoznačnosti (2002); Jezik i nacionalizam (2010)

Snježana Kordić (pronounced [sɲěʒana kôːrditɕ]; born October 29, 1964) is a Croatian linguist. In addition to her work in syntax, she has written on sociolinguistics. Kordić is known among non-specialists for her numerous articles against the puristic and prescriptive language policy in Croatia. Her 2010 book Jezik i nacionalizam (Language and Nationalism) popularised the theory of pluricentric languages in the Balkans.

== Biography ==
=== Education ===
Snježana Kordić obtained a degree from Osijek University (1988) and an M.Sci in Linguistics from the Faculty of Philosophy at Zagreb University (1992). She earned her Ph.D. in Zagreb in 1993. In 2002, she obtained a habilitation in Slavic philology (qualification at professorship level) from the University of Münster.

=== Academic appointments ===
Kordić taught and conducted research at various Croatian and German universities. From 1990 to 1991 she was an assistant at Osijek University, and from 1991 to 1995 she was an assistant at Zagreb University. She then moved to Germany and was a lecturer at the Bochum University from 1993 to 1998. She later served as an associate professor at the Münster University from 1998 to 2004. After that, she was a visiting professor at the Humboldt University of Berlin from 2004 to 2005. From 2005 to 2007 she was a lecturer at Frankfurt University.

== Works and reception ==
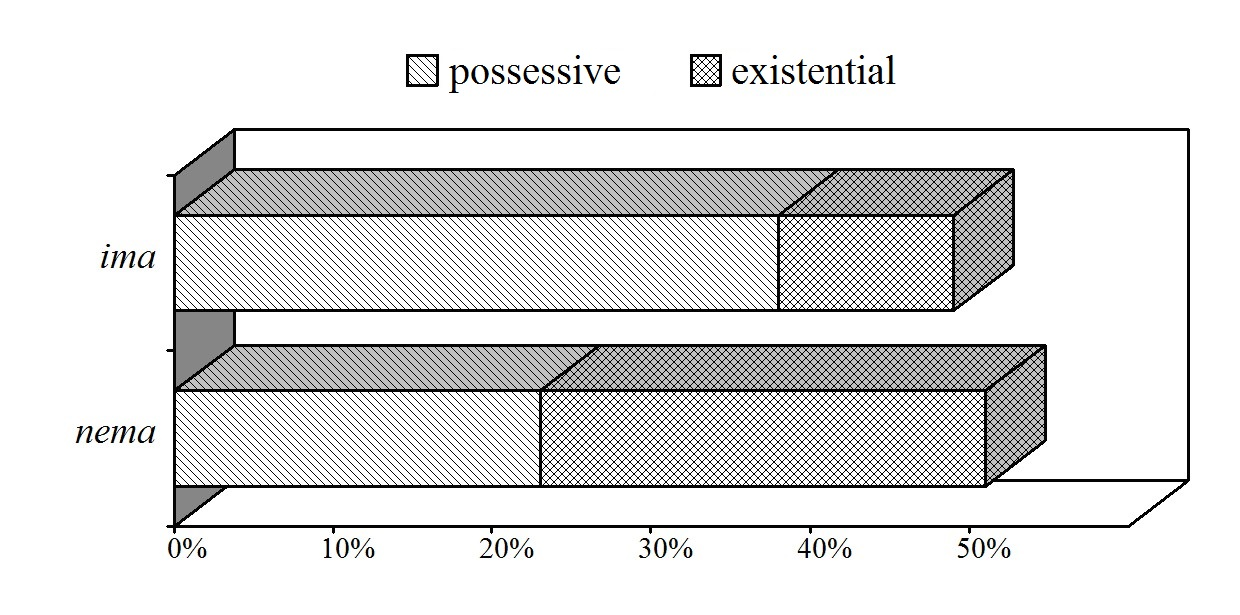
Existential clauses (Kordić)

Snježana Kordić's main focal points in research and teaching are grammar, syntax, discourse analysis, text linguistics, textual cohesion, pragmatics, lexicology, corpus linguistics, quantitative linguistics, critical linguistics, sociolinguistics and language policy. She has authored over 150 linguistic publications, including textbooks, a grammar book, and three monographs, which have been translated into English, German or Spanish. Each of her books on syntactic issues has gotten more positive reviews from around the world than any other linguistic book published in Croatia.

=== Monograph on relative clauses in Serbo-Croatian (1995) ===
Her first monograph on relative clauses was well received. Many reviewers commented favourably on it. Ian Press wrote:

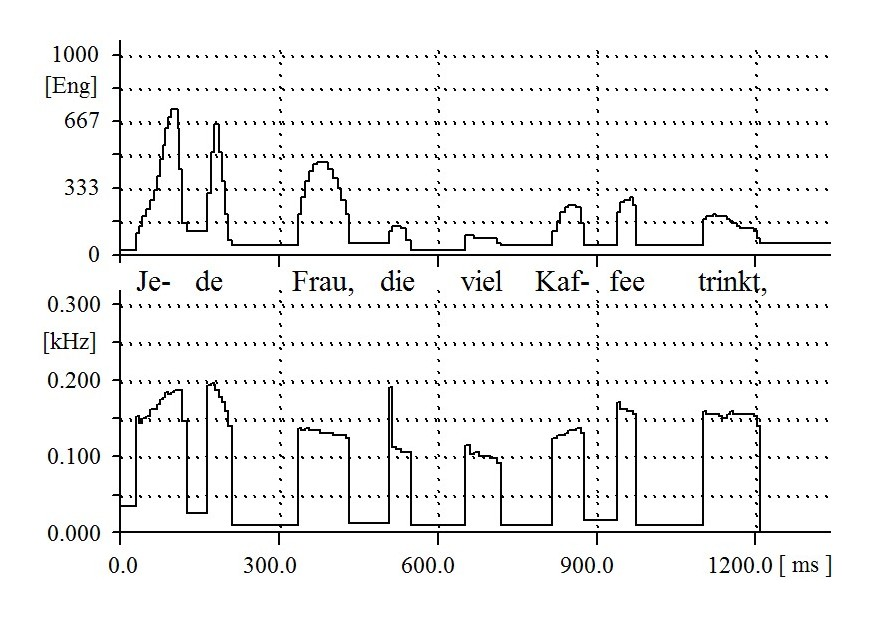
Intonation of restrictive relative clauses (Kordić)

This comprehensive study of relative clauses in Serbo-Croatian is a model of scholarly thoroughness and intellectual balance. [...] The work as a whole is most highly to be recommended to anyone studying relative clauses.

— The Slavonic and East European Review

Hans-Peter Stoffel underlined:

This excellent and informative monograph should form part of the personal library of all those interested in this field. The book answers questions which have always been asked but to which one never seemed to obtain a satisfactory answer. Kordić's book fills this lacuna in a commendable way.

— New Zealand Slavonic Journal

=== Monograph on Serbo-Croatian words on the border between lexicon and grammar (2002) ===
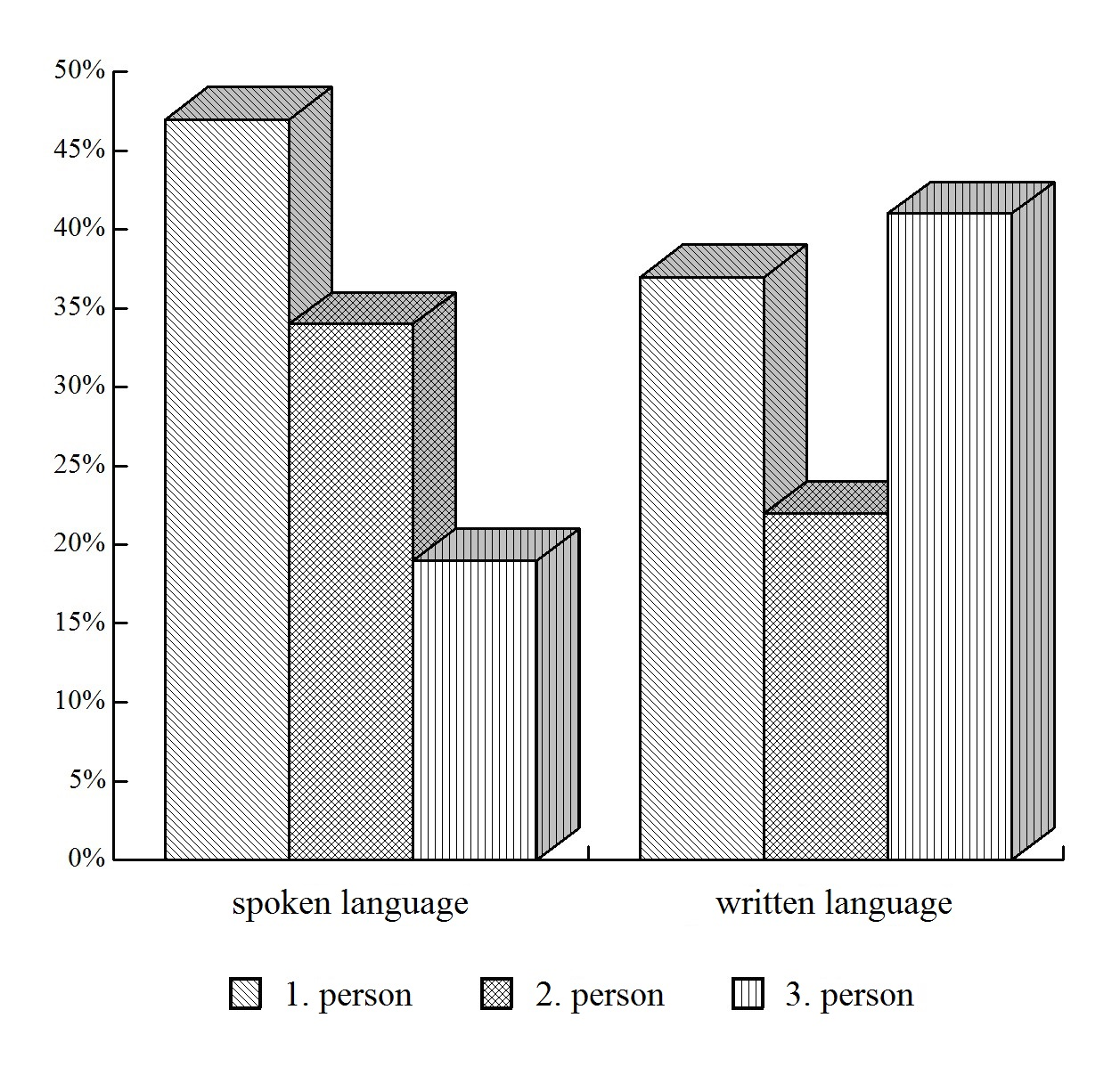
Personal pronouns (Kordić)

In her second monograph, which has also been reviewed with approval, Snježana Kordić examines Serbo-Croatian words that oscillate between having a full lexical status and a functional grammatical status, a factor that has complicated their lexicographic and grammatical description in dictionaries and grammars. These are mainly lexemes which have a high frequency usage and are used in many different ways. The monograph provides information on the syntax, semantics and pragmatics of the usage of selected pronouns, nouns, particle, conjunctions and verbs. Matthew Feeney concluded his review by saying:

Kordić provides much new information about the selected forms. This work will be of use to those who write in Croatian and Serbian, those who are writing grammars of the language, lexicographer, translators, students and teachers of the language, Slavic linguists and general linguists.

— Slavic and East European Journal

Peter Herrity emphasised that:

In all the chapters of this book the author has thoroughly researched the existing literature on the points covered and provided a conclusion on modern usage which will be invaluable for grammarians and lexicographers who often treat these subjects in a cursory fashion. This book will be a welcome addition to the field of Serbo-Croatian scholarship.

— The Slavonic and East European Review

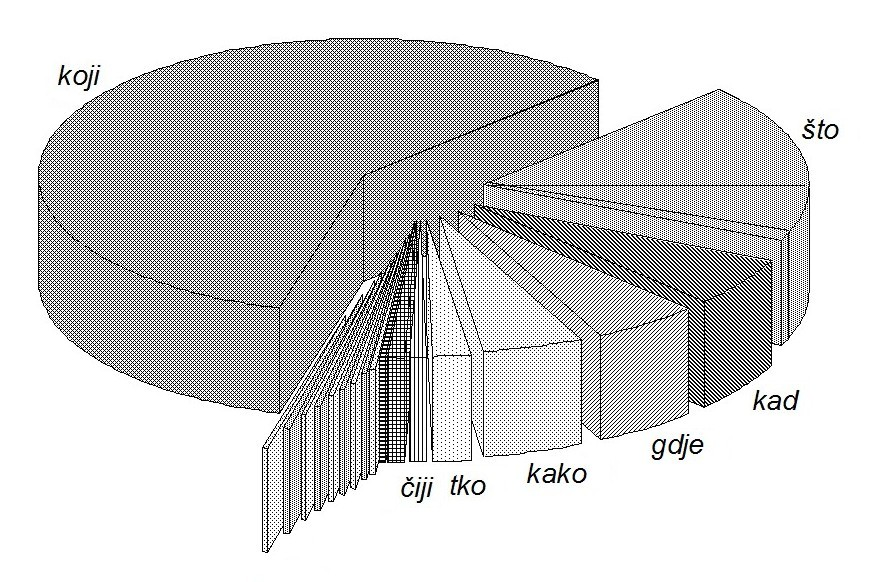
Frequency of relativizers (Kordić)

Wayles Browne, an American expert on relative clauses, commented both of the books. He noted that Kordić's first book on relative clauses is:

a valuable and thorough study of the grammar of relative constructions, drawing theoretical-linguistic inspiration from a number of sources and citing statistical results based on a large representative corpus.

— Canadian Slavonic Papers

In the same review article, Browne pointed out that Kordić's second monograph

shares the virtues of her work on relative clauses, being empirically well supported and making references to a variety of traditions in linguistics. One is impressed to see, on its pages, apposite quotations from independently developed German, Russian, Polish, Czech, and English-American scholarship converging on similar views.

— Canadian Slavonic Papers

=== Monograph on language and nationalism in Croatia (2010) ===
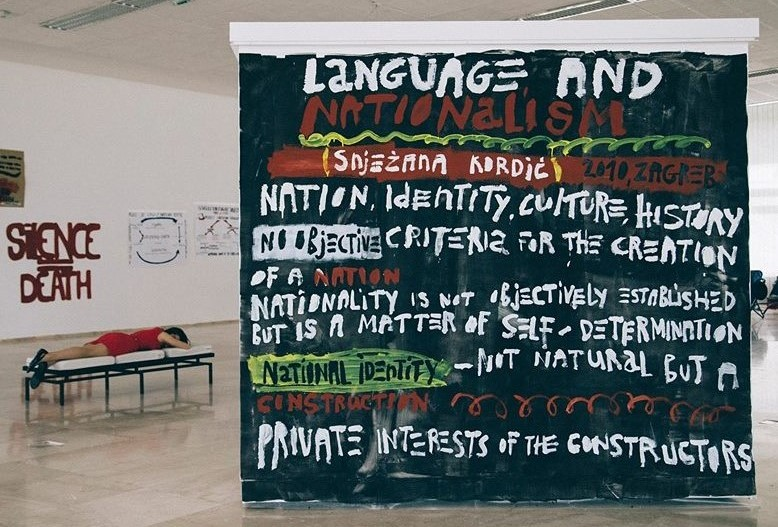
Chapter titles of Kordić's book

Snježana Kordić's third monograph deals with sociolinguistic topics, including Croatia's language policy, the theory of pluricentric languages, and how identity, culture, nation, and history can be misused by politically motivated linguists. Kordić asserts that purism and prescriptivism have been the main features of Croatia's language policy since 1990. A ban on certain words perceived as "Serbian" and the idea that a word is more "Croatian" if fewer Croats understood it, resulted in the widespread impression that no one but a handful of linguists in Croatia knew the standard language.

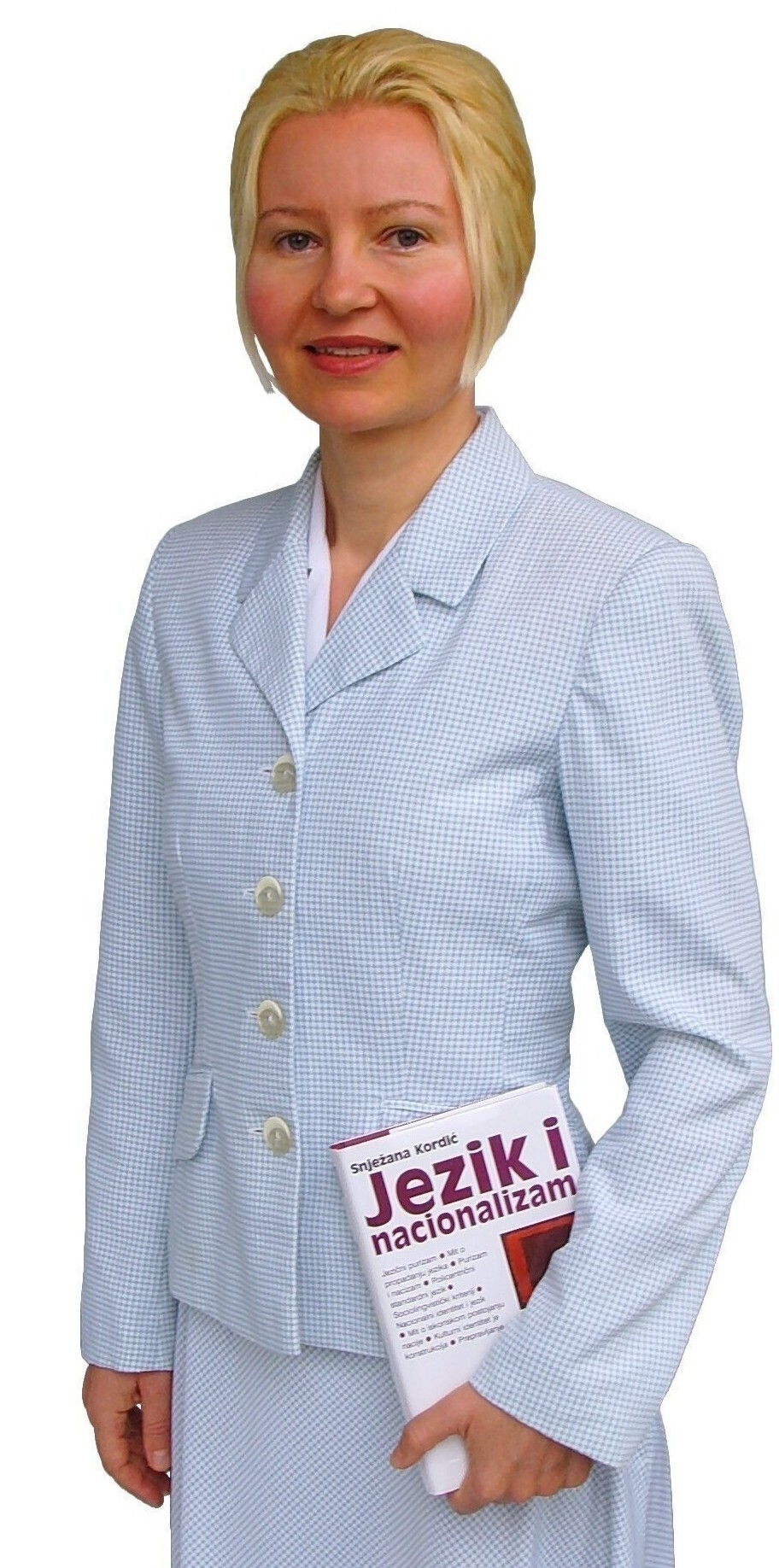
Snježana Kordić 2010 and her book, Jezik i nacionalizam

With a plethora of quotations from German, French, Polish, and English linguistic literature, Kordić demonstrates that the language of Croats, Serbs, Bosniaks, and Montenegrins is a polycentric language, with four standard variants spoken in Croatia, Serbia, Montenegro and Bosnia and Herzegovina.

These variants do differ slightly, as is the case with other polycentric languages (English, German, French, Portuguese, and Spanish, among others), but not to a degree which would justify considering them as different languages. This fact suggests by no means a re-establishment of a common state, since standard variants of all other polycentric languages are spoken in different countries, such as English in the US, UK, Australia, and Canada, and German in Austria, Germany, and Switzerland. The above examples demonstrate that pluricentricity of a language does not imply linguistic unification. Each nation can codify its variant on its own.

Kordić criticizes a romantic view of language and nation, which is widespread in Croatia. The romantic idea that nation and language must match has its roots in 19th century Germany, but was abandoned by the middle of the 20th century by the scientific community. She also argues against political interference in linguistics.

Regarding the name of the language, Kordić discusses only the name to be used in linguistics, leaving non-linguists to name the language any way they prefer.

The monograph generated significant media coverage. Kordić gave over sixty interviews discussing her book. Some prominent Croatian intellectuals have praised the book. The book also received negative criticism, in both Croatia and Serbia, where Serbian weekly journals stated that the book was "far more dangerous for Serbian linguistics than for Croatian [linguistics]" and that it was "destructive for the Serbs" because it "makes the language free from the Serbian tradition, it reduces the language to a symbolic-neutral communication tool, it encourages the indifference towards naming of the language and towards the number of different names given to the Serbian language". In Croatia, a group, Hitrec, tried to file a lawsuit against the then active minister of culture arguing that the state should not sponsor the book. However, the State's Attorney of Zagreb declined to prosecute. The attempt itself to file the lawsuit was criticised as a "witch hunt" in parts of the Croatian media. In 2017, Kordić's book became the inspiration for the Declaration on the Common Language which also attracted media attention.

In his review of the monograph on language and nationalism (Jezik i nacionalizam), Zoran Milutinović commented:

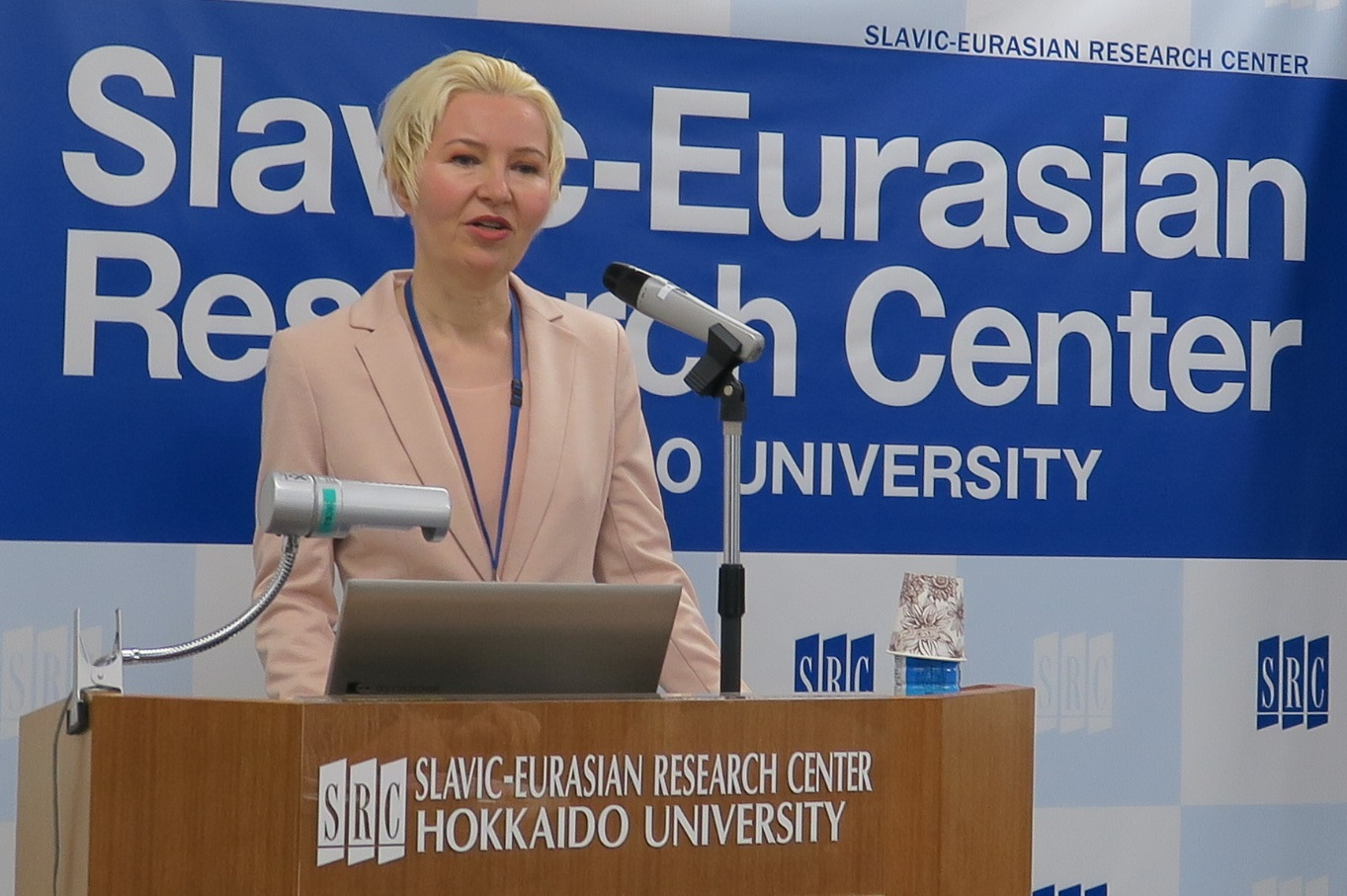
Snježana Kordić as keynote speaker at a conference in Japan (2018)

Jezik i nacionalizam is a thorough, well-argued and passionately written critique of linguistic nationalism, rooted in the fear that the nation will disappear unless it has a language of its own, and of its main features: the celebration of purism, the obsession with etymologies, the equation of nation with language, the falsification of history, revisionism, and political disqualification of one's opponents. Having been for years politically disqualified and professionally defamed herself, with this book Kordić offers an exemplary gesture of how linguistics can maintain its independence, dignity and high academic standards against political manipulation.

— The Slavonic and East European Review

Reviewer Tomasz Kamusella wrote:

After sustained, in-depth discussion, the author rightly notes that there is no linguistic or sociolinguistic basis that would justify or necessitate the splitting of Serbo-Croatian into its (to date) four successor languages.

— Eurasia Border Review

Reviewer Goran Miljan wrote:

Kordić elaborates the ideas of language, linguistics, politics, history, culture, etc. in a well-structured and academically highly laudable manner. [...] The fierce reactions to the book cannot surprise: Whilst some intellectuals praised the book, more deemed it necessary to engage into battle against such heresy. [...] Such statements exactly demonstrate the prevailing discourse against which Kordić critically engages in her book, namely that Croatian identity, language, culture, and nation are viewed and explained as inseparable. If one tries to scientifically question one of these 'core elements' of nationhood, and tries to deconstruct them, she/he risks the possibility of becoming ostracized.

— H-Soz-u-Kult

== Selected publications ==
See also "Complete list of publications by Snježana Kordić" (in Serbo-Croatian). croris.hr.

=== Monographs ===
- —— (1995). Relativna rečenica [Relative Clauses] (PDF). Znanstvena biblioteka Hrvatskog filološkog društva; 25 (in Serbo-Croatian). Zagreb: Matica hrvatska/Hrvatsko filološko društvo. p. 366. doi:10.2139/ssrn.3460911. ISBN 953-6050-04-8. LCCN 97154457. OCLC 37606491. OL 2863536W. SSRN 3460911. British Library 008182120. SUDOC 005906202. SELIBR 7994083. CroRIS 6656. COBISS.SR 110665484. Wikidata Q20018074. Altmetric 69351565. Archived from the original (PDF) on 8 July 2012.
  - —— (2005) [1st pub. 1999; 2nd pub. 2002; 3rd pub. 2005]. Der Relativsatz im Serbokroatischen [Relative Clauses in Serbo-Croatian]. Studies in Slavic Linguistics; 10 (in German). Munich: Lincom Europa. p. 330. ISBN 3-89586-573-7. OCLC 42422661. OL 2863535W. S2CID 171902446. DNB-IDN 956417647. NYPL b14328353. SELIBR 6690649. HathiTrust 004038082. CroRIS 6654. COBISS.SR 232241159. Contents.
- —— (2002). Riječi na granici punoznačnosti [Words on the Border Between Lexicon and Grammar] (PDF) (in Serbo-Croatian). Zagreb: Hrvatska sveučilišna naklada. p. 227. doi:10.2139/ssrn.3467413. ISBN 953-169-073-1. LCCN 2009386657. OCLC 54680648. OL 2863537W. S2CID 61311912. SSRN 3467413. SUDOC 097547352. CroRIS 6652. COBISS.SR 110666508. Wikidata Q20032127. Altmetric 69352624. Archived from the original (PDF) on 8 July 2012.
  - —— (2001). Wörter im Grenzbereich von Lexikon und Grammatik im Serbokroatischen [Serbo-Croatian Words on the Border Between Lexicon and Grammar]. Studies in Slavic Linguistics; 18 (in German). Munich: Lincom Europa. p. 280. ISBN 3-89586-954-6. LCCN 2005530314. OCLC 47905097. OL 2863539W. DNB-IDN 963264087. SUDOC 083721398. NYPL b15245330. NCID BA56769448. SELIBR 8335022. CroRIS 6653. HathiTrust 004259176.
- —— (2018) [1st pub. 2010]. Jezik i nacionalizam [Language and Nationalism] (PDF). Rotulus Universitas (in Serbo-Croatian). Zagreb: Durieux. p. 430. doi:10.2139/ssrn.3467646. ISBN 978-953-188-311-5. LCCN 2011520778. OCLC 729837512. OL 15270636W. S2CID 220918333. SSRN 3467646. British Library 015702691. SUDOC 17473820X. UPC 9789531883115. SELIBR 11895519. CroRIS 7521. COBISS 13436977. COBISS.SR 521757076. Wikidata Q12957718. Altmetric 69349127. Archived from the original (PDF) on 8 July 2012.^{[a]}^{[b]}
  - —— (2021) [1st pub. 2014]. Lengua y Nacionalismo [Language and Nationalism]. Bibliotheca Balcanica; 1 (in Spanish). Translated by Juan Cristóbal Díaz Beltrán. Doxa & Episteme. p. 553. ASIN B09NNTBYYP. [1st pub OL 16814702W. ISBN 978-84-936668-8-0. CroRIS 11765. "Índice". Archived from the original on 2016-03-04..]

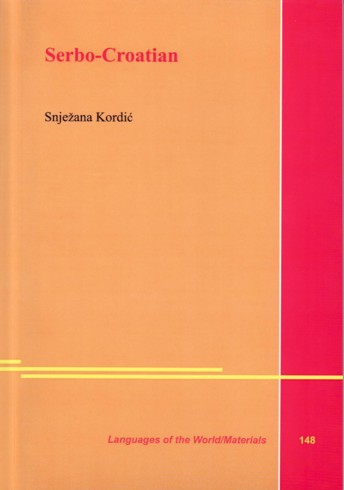
Book cover of Kordić's grammar book Serbo-Croatian (published 1997, 2006)

=== Other publications in English ===
- —— (2006) [1st pub. 1997]. Serbo-Croatian. Languages of the World/Materials; 148. Munich & Newcastle: Lincom Europa. p. 71. ISBN 3-89586-161-8. OCLC 37959860. OL 2863538W. DNB-IDN 950901075. British Library 006531296. SUDOC 049200976. NYPL b13481076. NCID BA34854554. SELIBR 6690539. CroRIS 6655. COBISS.SR 100442892. [grammar book]
  - —— (2004) [1st pub. 1997]. Kroatisch-Serbisch. Ein Lehrbuch für Fortgeschrittene mit Grammatik [Serbo-Croatian. A Textbook for Advanced Students with Grammar] (in Serbo-Croatian). Hamburg: Buske. p. 196. ISBN 3-87548-382-0. OL 15270855W. [1st pub ISBN 3-87548-162-3. OCLC 40305383. DNB-IDN 974026573. NCID BA59134453. HathiTrust 004006395. CroRIS 743991. COBISS.SR 99972620.] and audiocassette: 65 minutes OCLC 179711958
- —— (2024). "Ideology Against Language: The Current Situation in South Slavic Countries" (PDF). In Nomachi, Motoki; Kamusella, Tomasz (eds.). Languages and Nationalism Instead of Empires. Routledge Histories of Central and Eastern Europe. London: Routledge. pp. 167–179. doi:10.4324/9781003034025-11. ISBN 978-0-367-47191-0. OCLC 1390118985. S2CID 259576119. CroRIS 813054. Archived from the original on 10 January 2024 – via Researchgate. COBISS.SR 125229577. COBISS 171014403.

== Media interviews ==
In Croatia

- Lasić, Igor (11 January 2008). "Kroatisti ne govore kao lingvisti: razgovor sa Snježanom Kordić" [Croatists don't speak like linguists: Interview with Snježana Kordić]. Feral Tribune (in Serbo-Croatian). Split: 34–35. ISSN 1333-9109. CroRIS 766498. Archived from the original on 1 June 2012.
- Dragojević, Rade (6 August 2010). "Hrvati i Srbi u Hrvatskoj jezično se ne razlikuju: razgovor sa Snježanom Kordić" [Croats and Serbs in Croatia do not differ in their language: Interview with Snježana Kordić] (in Serbo-Croatian). Zagreb: Novosti. pp. 14–15. ISSN 1845-8955. S2CID 155260650. CroRIS 766497. Archived from the original on 4 June 2012.
- Fabrio, Bisera (20 August 2010). "Nismo manje Hrvati zato što govorimo isto kao Srbi: razgovor sa Snježanom Kordić" [We are not less Croatian because we speak like Serbs: Interview with Snježana Kordić]. Globus: Ilustrirani Tjednik (in Serbo-Croatian). Zagreb: Globus. pp. 30–33. ISSN 0353-9903. CroRIS 766495. Archived (PDF) from the original on 29 May 2012.
- Gromača Vadanjel, Tatjana (4 September 2010). "Hrvatska je još u kamenom dobu: razgovor sa Snježanom Kordić" [Croatia is still in the Stone Age: Interview with Snježana Kordić] (in Serbo-Croatian). Rijeka: Novi list. pp. 10–11 in the arts section Pogled. ISSN 1334-1545. S2CID 163398275. CroRIS 766709. Archived from the original on 29 May 2012.
- Bakotin, Jerko (29 September 2010). "Otrovne laži o jeziku: razgovor sa Snježanom Kordić" [Toxic lies about language: Interview with Snježana Kordić] (in Serbo-Croatian). Zagreb: H-alter. ISSN 1847-3784. S2CID 164260984. CroRIS 766711. Archived from the original on 17 June 2012.
- Matijanić, Vladimir (6 November 2010). "Podudaranje jezika i nacije samo je mit: razgovor sa Snježanom Kordić" [Overlapping of language and nation is only a myth: Interview with Snježana Kordić] (in Serbo-Croatian). Split: Slobodna Dalmacija. p. 9 in the arts section Spektar. ISSN 0350-4662. CroRIS 767217. Archived from the original on 25 September 2013.
- Popović, Sofija (6 December 2011). "HAZU treba ukinuti a jezične puritance bojkotirati jer zarađuju na nacionalizmu: razgovor sa Snježanom Kordić" [The Croatian Academy of Sciences and Arts should be abolished and puritan linguists boycotted because they profit from nationalism: Interview with Snježana Kordić]. Nacional (in Serbo-Croatian). Zagreb: 64–68. ISSN 1330-9048. CroRIS 769931. Archived (PDF) from the original on 1 June 2012.
- Derk, Denis (10 December 2011). "Narod može nazivati jezik kako god mu drago: razgovor sa Snježanom Kordić" [People can call the language whatever they like: Interview with Snježana Kordić] (PDF). Večernji list (in Serbo-Croatian). Zagreb. pp. 60–62 in the arts section Obzor. ISSN 0350-5006. CroRIS 769932. Archived from the original (PDF) on 1 June 2012.
- Grozdanić, Dragan (20 January 2012). "Kroatisti građane prave nacionalistima: razgovor sa Snježanom Kordić" [Croatists make citizens nationalists: Interview with Snježana Kordić] (PDF) (in Serbo-Croatian). Zagreb: Novosti. pp. 8–9. ISSN 1845-8955. CroRIS 770258. Archived from the original (PDF) on 22 September 2013.
- Hut Kono, Vinko (2 February 2012). "Kroatisti otuđeni od stvarnosti: razgovor sa Snježanom Kordić" [Croatists are far from reality: Interview with Snježana Kordić]. Zarez (in Serbo-Croatian). Zagreb: 3. ISSN 1331-7970. CroRIS 770154. Archived from the original on 1 June 2012.
- Gregović, Marko (host) (22 March 2012). "Jezik i politika: razgovor sa Snježanom Kordić" [Language and Politics: Interview with Snježana Kordić]. Kultura demokracije (in Serbo-Croatian). Croatian Radio 3. CroRIS 770418. Archived from the original on 22 September 2013. 45 minutes.
- Cuculić, Kim (19 January 2013). "Ćirilica u Vukovaru nije znak dvojezičnosti: razgovor sa Snježanom Kordić" [In Vukovar, Cyrillic is not a sign of bilingualism: Interview with Snježana Kordić] (PDF) (in Serbo-Croatian). Rijeka: Novi list. pp. 14–15 in the arts section Pogled. ISSN 1334-1545. CroRIS 772032. Archived from the original on 3 February 2013.
- Jovanović, Nenad (19 April 2013). "Govorimo istim jezikom: razgovor sa Snježanom Kordić" [We speak the same language: Interview with Snježana Kordić] (in Serbo-Croatian). Zagreb: Novosti. pp. 26–27. ISSN 1845-8955. CroRIS 772364. Archived from the original on 25 April 2013.; "Lingvisten Snježana Kordić: Vi talar sammar språk!" [Linguist Snježana Kordić: We speak the same language]. Diaspora (in Swedish). Stockholm: Diaspora 16 (3): 10–13. June 2013. ISSN 1402-9308. Archived from the original on 2 December 2013.
- Pilsel, Drago (26 October 2013). "Gdje je prisutan jezični purizam, prisutan je i nacionalizam: razgovor sa Snježanom Kordić" [The linguistic purism and nationalism come together: Interview with Snježana Kordić] (in Serbo-Croatian). Zagreb: autograf.hr. ISSN 1849-143X. CroRIS 773167. Archived from the original on 30 October 2013.
- Stanković, Aleksandar (host) (25 May 2014). "Razgovor sa Snježanom Kordić" [Interview with Snježana Kordić]. Nedjeljom u dva. Season 14. Episode 578 (in Serbo-Croatian). Zagreb. Croatian Radiotelevision 1. Archived from the original on 13 December 2014. Alt URL. CroRIS 775078. 62 minutes.
- Gromača Vadanjel, Tatjana (4 July 2015). "Jezikoslovci odbacili znanost u korist nacionalističke politike: razgovor sa Snježanom Kordić" [Linguists have rejected science in favor of nationalist politics: Interview with Snježana Kordić] (in Serbo-Croatian). Rijeka: Novi list. pp. 12–13 in the arts section Pogled. ISSN 1334-1545. CroRIS 776903. Archived from the original on 11 July 2015.
- Lasić, Igor (13 January 2017). "Četiri naziva uzgajaju zabludu o četiri jezika: razgovor sa Snježanom Kordić" [Four names suggest four languages: Interview with Snježana Kordić] (in Serbo-Croatian). Zagreb: Novosti. pp. 16–17. ISSN 1845-8955. CroRIS 782402. Archived from the original on 22 January 2017.
- Derk, Denis (4 April 2017). "Neki Srbi misle da Deklaracija favorizira Hrvate: razgovor sa Snježanom Kordić" [Some Serbs think the Declaration favors Croats: Interview with Snježana Kordić]. Večernji list (in Serbo-Croatian). Zagreb. pp. 36–37. ISSN 0350-5006. CroRIS 782401. Archived from the original on 21 September 2017.

In Bosnia

- Begović, Nađa (12 August 2010). "Jezik za zube - Govori kao što govoriš: razgovor sa Snježanom Kordić" [Shut up - Speak as you speak: Interview with Snježana Kordić]. Slobodna Bosna (in Serbo-Croatian). Sarajevo: 58–61. ISSN 0354-1436. S2CID 157185556. CroRIS 766496. Archived from the original on 1 June 2012.
- FENA (21 March 2011). "Kod nas ljudi robuju pogrešnom uvjerenju da se nacija i jezik moraju podudarati: razgovor sa Snježanom Kordić" [We are slaves to the prejudice that nation and language have to overlap: Interview with Snježana Kordić] (in Serbo-Croatian). Sarajevo: Federal News Agency of the republic of Bosnia and Herzegovina. S2CID 171549250. CroRIS 767822. Archived from the original on 28 September 2013.
- Tikveša, Amer (20 May 2011). "Jezik kao sredstvo manipulacije: razgovor sa Snježanom Kordić" [Language as a device for manipulation: Interview with Snježana Kordić] (PDF). Dani (in Serbo-Croatian). Sarajevo: BH Dani: 70–72. ISSN 1512-5130. CroRIS 768055. Archived from the original (PDF) on 1 June 2012.
- Babić, Ladislav (6 January 2012). "Jezikoslovci otuđeni od jezika: razgovor sa Snježanom Kordić" [Linguists are far from language: Interview with Snježana Kordić] (in Serbo-Croatian). Mostar: Tačno.net. CroRIS 770259. Archived from the original on 1 May 2012.
- Osmić, Anes (22 October 2012). "Jezik, nacija i laži: razgovor sa Snježanom Kordić" [Language, nation, and lies: Interview with Snježana Kordić] (PDF) (in Serbo-Croatian). Sarajevo: Novinar.me. CroRIS 771265. Archived from the original (PDF) on 21 September 2013.
- Omerbegović, Nermina (19 February 2013). "Nacionalistički krugovi usađuju krivo uvjerenje da svaka nacija mora imati zaseban jezik: razgovor sa Snježanom Kordić" [Nationalistic circles spread the prejudice that every nation must have a different language: Interview with Snježana Kordić] (in Serbo-Croatian). Sarajevo: Federal News Agency of the Republic of Bosnia and Herzegovina. CroRIS 772033. Archived from the original on 15 April 2013.
- Vuković, Uglješa (21 February 2013). "Javnosti je prešućen opis naše jezične situacije: razgovor sa Snježanom Kordić" [The description of our linguistic situation was kept secret from the public: Interview with Snježana Kordić] (in Serbo-Croatian). Sarajevo: Diskriminacija. CroRIS 772089. Archived from the original on 22 September 2013.
- Isović, Maja (14 February 2014). "Forsiraju netočnu percepciju jezične stvarnosti: razgovor sa Snježanom Kordić" [A forced incorrect perception of linguistic reality: Interview with Snježana Kordić] (in Serbo-Croatian). Banja Luka: Buka. CroRIS 774502. Archived from the original on 4 March 2014.
- Kahrović-Posavljak, Amila (18 July 2014). "Sveto trojstvo jezika, nacije i države: razgovor sa Snježanom Kordić" [The Holy Trinity of Language, Nation and State: Interview with Snježana Kordić] (PDF). Dani (in Serbo-Croatian). Sarajevo: BH Dani: 60–62. ISSN 1512-5130. CroRIS 775079. Archived from the original (PDF) on 22 October 2014.
- Galić, Štefica (15 February 2015). "Ovdašnja društva su zaglibljena u besmislenim, apsurdnim temama: razgovor sa Snježanom Kordić" [Local societies are bogged down in meaningless, absurd topics: Interview with Snježana Kordić] (in Serbo-Croatian). Mostar: Tačno.net. CroRIS 776258. Archived from the original on 15 March 2015.
- Husković, Neđad (host) (16 March 2015). "Jezik kao izgovor za segregaciju u obrazovanju: razgovor sa Snježanom Kordić" [Language as an excuse for segregation in education: Interview with Snježana Kordić] (in Serbo-Croatian). Radio Mostar. CroRIS 776519. Archived from the original on 28 June 2022. 15 minutes.
- Behram, Mirsad (host) (17 March 2015). "Jezičke i podjele u školama odgovaraju političarima i lingvistima: razgovor sa Snježanom Kordić" [Linguistic divisions in schools come in handy for politicians and linguists: Interview with Snježana Kordić]. Radio Slobodna Evropa (in Serbo-Croatian). Radio Free Europe. CroRIS 776517. Archived from the original on 22 March 2015. Alt URL 5 minutes.
- Copf, Andrijana (25 March 2015). "Jezik je lažni razlog za razdvajanje učenika: razgovor sa Snježanom Kordić" [Language is a false reason for separating students: Interview with Snježana Kordić]. Dnevni list (in Serbo-Croatian). Mostar. pp. 40–41. ISSN 1512-8792. CroRIS 776518. Archived from the original (PDF) on 8 May 2015.
- Manjgo, Sanja (host) (18 May 2015). "Vaš glas u medijima: razgovor sa Snježanom Kordić" [Your voice in the media: Interview with Snježana Kordić] (in Serbo-Croatian). Vijeće za štampu BiH. CroRIS 776816. Archived from the original on 20 November 2015. 7 minutes.
- Vučić, Nikola (15 June 2016). "Većina lingvista ne želi biti u konfliktu s vladajućom ideologijom: razgovor sa Snježanom Kordić" [Most linguists want to run away from conflict with the dominant ideology: Interview with Snježana Kordić] (in Serbo-Croatian). Sarajevo: Urban magazin. pp. 46–49. ISSN 1986-6143. CroRIS 778623. Archived from the original on 13 October 2016.
- Vučić, Nikola (host) (21 November 2016). "Srbi, Hrvati, Bošnjaci i Crnogorci govore istim jezikom: razgovor sa Snježanom Kordić" [Serbs, Croats, Bosniaks and Montenegrins speak the same language: Interview with Snježana Kordić]. N1 na jedan (in Serbo-Croatian). Sarajevo. N1 (TV channel). CroRIS 782424. 25 minutes.
- Jašar, Minela (host) (22 November 2016). "Konferencija Jezici i nacionalizmi: razgovor sa Snježanom Kordić" [Conference Languages and nationalisms: Interview with Snježana Kordić]. Novi dan (in Serbo-Croatian). Sarajevo. N1 (TV channel). CroRIS 782423. 15 minutes.
- Saljihi, Sanija (host) (23 November 2016). "Jezik i nacionalizam: razgovor sa Snježanom Kordić" [Language and Nationalism: Interview with Snježana Kordić]. Razgovori (in Serbo-Croatian). Sarajevo. BH Radio 1. Archived from the original on 27 March 2019. CroRIS 782422. 11 minutes.
- Bilić, Ivana (25 November 2016). "I dalje ćemo govoriti jednim zajedničkim jezikom: razgovor sa Snježanom Kordić" [We will continue to speak a common language: Interview with Snježana Kordić]. Radio Slobodna Evropa (in Serbo-Croatian). Radio Free Europe/Radio Liberty. CroRIS 782421. Archived from the original on 27 March 2019.
- "Jezikoslovci protiv politokratije i etnonacionalizma: razgovor sa Snježanom Kordić" [Linguists against Politocracy and Ethno-nationalism: Interview with Snježana Kordić]. Interviews (in Serbo-Croatian). Sarajevo. 26 November 2016. SENS TV (Multimedia News Network). CroRIS 782420. 8 minutes.
- Kahrović-Posavljak, Amila (10 December 2016). "Rješenje je neutralan naziv jezika: razgovor sa Snježanom Kordić" [The solution is a neutral language name: Interview with Snježana Kordić] (in Serbo-Croatian). Sarajevo: Interview.ba. Archived from the original on 27 March 2019.
- Reko, Lejla (11 December 2016). "Naše škole i fakulteti su rasadište nacionalističkih mitova o jeziku: razgovor sa Snježanom Kordić" [Our schools and faculties are hotbeds of nationalist myths about language: Interview with Snježana Kordić] (in Serbo-Croatian). Sarajevo: Prometej. CroRIS 782408. Archived from the original on 27 March 2019.
- Zukić, Amir (host) (29 March 2017). "Gošća Pressinga Snježana Kordić" [Guest of the Pressing Snježana Kordić]. Pressing (in Serbo-Croatian). Sarajevo. N1 (TV channel). Archived from the original on 27 March 2019. Alt URL CroRIS 782403. 53 minutes.
- Baždalić, Ines (host) (26 March 2018). "Dan materinskog jezika: razgovor sa Snježanom Kordić" [Mother language day: Interview with Snježana Kordić]. Epicentar (in Serbo-Croatian). Sarajevo. BH Radio 1. Archived from the original on 7 August 2018. CroRIS 782399. 30 minutes.
- Dautbegović-Voloder, Alma (host) (27 March 2018). "Kordić: Nacionalizam se zahuktava i danas" [Kordić: Nationalism is on the rise]. Novi dan (in Serbo-Croatian). Sarajevo. N1 (TV channel). CroRIS 782398. 15 minutes.
- Marić, Bojana (host) (23 March 2018). "Jezik kao sredstvo ideološke propagande: razgovor sa Snježanom Kordić" [Language as a means of ideological propaganda: Interview with Snježana Kordić]. Otvoreni studio (in Serbo-Croatian). Sarajevo. BH Radio 1. Archived from the original on 7 August 2018. CroRIS 782396. 12 minutes.
- Abadžija, Maja (26 March 2018). "Deklaracija ruši i posljednji tabu: razgovor sa Snježanom Kordić" [The Declaration breaks down the last taboo: Interview with Snježana Kordić] (in Serbo-Croatian). Sarajevo: Oslobođenje. pp. 18–19. ISSN 0351-3904. CroRIS 782390. Archived from the original on 7 August 2018. Alt URL
- Sandić-Hadžihasanović, Gordana (30 March 2018). "Čistoća naroda i jezika ne postoji: razgovor sa Snježanom Kordić" [The purity of the people and language does not exist: Interview with Snježana Kordić]. Radio Slobodna Evropa (in Serbo-Croatian). Radio Free Europe/Radio Liberty. CroRIS 782392. Archived from the original on 30 March 2018.

In Serbia

- Nikolić, Tatjana (28 October 2010). "Odstrel reči: razgovor sa Snježanom Kordić" [Elimination of words: Interview with Snježana Kordić]. Nin. Nedeljne Informativne Novine (in Serbo-Croatian). Belgrade: NIN: 58–59. ISSN 0027-6685. CroRIS 767216. Archived from the original on 22 September 2013.
- Jovanović Maldoran, Srđan (14 May 2011). "Nacionalizam, jezik i EU: razgovor sa Snježanom Kordić" [Nationalism, language, and EU: Interview with Snježana Kordić]. Danas: Dnevnik (in Serbo-Croatian). Belgrade: Danas: 7–8. ISSN 1450-538X. S2CID 158981733. CroRIS 768046. Archived from the original on 23 September 2013.
- Knežević, Jurica (6 October 2012). "Govorimo istim jezikom: razgovor sa Snježanom Kordić" [We speak the same language: Interview with Snježana Kordić] (in Serbo-Croatian). Belgrade: Večernje novosti. ISSN 0350-4999. CroRIS 771266. Archived from the original on 21 September 2013.
- Pavlica, Damjan (9 January 2013). "Ćirilica u Vukovaru nije znak dvojezičnosti: razgovor sa Snježanom Kordić" [In Vukovar, Cyrillic is not a sign of bilingualism: Interview with Snježana Kordić] (in Serbo-Croatian). Belgrade: E-novine. CroRIS 772090. Archived from the original on 30 January 2013.
- Ćirić, Saša (host) (27 February 2013). "Regionalni kulturni fenomeni: razgovor sa Snježanom Kordić" [Regional cultural phenomena: Interview with Snježana Kordić]. Oko Balkana (in Serbo-Croatian). Radio Belgrade 2. CroRIS 772134. Archived from the original on 21 September 2013. 40 minutes.
- Stevanović, Marjana (23 October 2013). "U Vukovaru vlada jezični aparthejd: razgovor sa Snježanom Kordić" [There is a linguistic apartheid in Vukovar: Interview with Snježana Kordić]. Danas: Dnevnik (in Serbo-Croatian). Belgrade: Danas: 7. ISSN 1450-538X. CroRIS 773169. Archived from the original on 25 October 2013.; "Comment la langue sert d'alibi aux thèses nationalistes" [How language is used as a pretext for nationalistic theses] (in French). Le Courrier des Balkans. 2 November 2013. Archived from the original on 27 November 2013.
- Stevanović, Marjana (5 October 2016). "Lingvisti plešu u nacionalističkom kolu: razgovor sa Snježanom Kordić" [Linguists dance in a nationalistic circle: Interview with Snježana Kordić]. Danas: Dnevnik (in Serbo-Croatian). Belgrade: Danas: 1, 6–7. ISSN 1450-538X. CroRIS 782426. Archived from the original on 25 December 2018.
- Ćirić, Saša (host) (12 October 2016). "Regionalni kulturni fenomeni: razgovor sa Snježanom Kordić" [Regional cultural phenomena: Interview with Snježana Kordić]. Oko Balkana (in Serbo-Croatian). Belgrade. Radio Belgrade 2. Archived from the original on 24 December 2018.Alt URL CroRIS 782425. 30 minutes or transcription.
- Mojsilović, Julijana (host) (13 October 2016). "Cilj nacionalizma je izokrenuta slika stvarnosti: razgovor sa Snježanom Kordić" [The goal of nationalism is a distorted picture of reality: Interview with Snježana Kordić]. TV Novi magazin (in Serbo-Croatian). Novi magazin. ISSN 2217-5628. CroRIS 782427. Archived from the original on 27 March 2019. 7 minutes.
- Ćirić, Sonja (13 April 2017). "Jezik više naroda: razgovor sa Snježanom Kordić" [The language of several nations: Interview with Snježana Kordić]. Vreme: Nedeljnik (in Serbo-Croatian). Belgrade: Vreme. ISSN 0353-8028. CroRIS 782406. Archived from the original on 26 August 2017.

In Montenegro

- Raičević, Rajka (12 September 2010). "Nacionalizam stoji iza uvođenja novogovora: razgovor sa Snježanom Kordić" [Nationalism is behind the introduction of Newspeak: Interview with Snježana Kordić] (PDF). Dan: Dnevne Novine (in Serbo-Croatian). Podgorica: Dan: 9. ISSN 1450-7943. CroRIS 766710. Archived from the original (PDF) on 7 September 2012.
- Lajović, Vuk (24 July 2012). "Političari prodaju maglu: razgovor sa Snježanom Kordić" [Politicians are blowing smoke: Interview with Snježana Kordić] (PDF). Vijesti (in Serbo-Croatian). Podgorica. ISSN 1450-6181. CroRIS 770986. Archived from the original (PDF) on 21 September 2013. Video fragment 10 minutes.
- Pavičević, Ranko (November 2012). "Jezičkim zatvaranjem protiv pomirenja: razgovor sa Snježanom Kordić" [Language poses barriers to reconciliation: Interview with Snježana Kordić] (PDF) (in Serbo-Croatian). Kotor: Glas Boke. pp. 13–16. ISSN 1800-7821. {CroRIS 772303. Archived from the original (PDF) on 23 September 2013.
- Grabić, Tanja (host) (26 January 2015). "Ne žele priznati da godinama lažu: razgovor sa Snježanom Kordić" [They don't want to admit to years of lying: Interview with Snježana Kordić] (PDF). U svjetlu kulture (in Serbo-Croatian). Tivat: Radio DUX (radio hrvatske nacionalne manjine u Crnoj Gori). CroRIS 776086. Archived from the original (PDF) on 15 April 2015. 15 minutes.
- Rakočević, Ksenija (20 June 2015). "Nacionalizam je jedan oblik luđačke košulje: razgovor sa Snježanom Kordić" [Nationalism is a form of straitjacket: Interview with Snježana Kordić]. Vijesti (in Serbo-Croatian). Podgorica. ISSN 1450-6181. CroRIS 776902. Archived from the original on 11 July 2015. URL
- Popović, Mirjana D. (4 September 2017). "Različiti jezici su legalno ovjerena laž: razgovor sa Snježanom Kordić" [Different languages are legally verified lie: Interview with Snježana Kordić]. Dan: Dnevne Novine (in Serbo-Croatian). Podgorica: Dan: 11. ISSN 1450-7943. CroRIS 782404. Archived from the original on 27 March 2019.

== See also ==
- Ausbausprache
- Cooperative principle
- Croatian Academy of Sciences and Arts
- Deixis
- Demonstrative pronoun
- Descriptive linguistics
- Differences between Serbo-Croatian standard varieties
- Dual
- Existential clause
- Folk linguistics
- Function word
- Grammatical number
- Implicature
- Language policy
- Language secessionism in Serbo-Croatian
- Linguistic prescription
- Mutual intelligibility
- Personal pronoun
- Philosophy of language
- Pluricentric Serbo-Croatian language
- Possessive
- Pro-drop language
- Quantitative linguistics
- Relative pronoun
- Relativizer
- Restrictive clause
- Serbo-Croatian grammar
- Serbo-Croatian language
- Serbo-Croatian phonology
- Serbo-Croatian reflexive pronoun
- Serbo-Croatian relative clauses
- Sociolinguistics
- South Slavic dialect continuum
- South Slavic languages
- Standard language
- Suppletion
- Štokavian
- T–V distinction
- Word order
- Vladimir Anić
- Stjepan Babić
- Dalibor Brozović
- Ranko Bugarski
- Paul Grice
- Bernhard Gröschel
- Senahid Halilović
- Janko Polić Kamov
- Radoslav Katičić
- Heinz Kloss
- August Kovačec
- Predrag Matvejević
- Svein Mønnesland
- Ivo Pranjković
- Matija Antun Reljković
- Michael Schmidt-Salomon
- Dubravko Škiljan
- Mario Vargas Llosa

== Explanatory notes ==
a. The Durieux-Editor Nenad Popović was honored by the German newspaper Süddeutsche Zeitung as one of the six persons that rendered outstanding services to peace in the world in 2010. The reason for this award was the book Language and Nationalism by Snježana Kordić. Süddeutsche Zeitung writes the following about the book: "In diesem Jahr machte Popovićs Verlag mit einem Buch der Autorin Snježana Kordić auf dem ganzen Balkan Furore. In ihrem Werk 'Die Sprache und der Nationalismus' kommt die in Zagreb und Münster ausgebildete Sprachwissenschaftlerin zum Schluss, dass die südslawischen Völker – Serben, Kroaten, Bosnier und Montenegriner – eine gemeinsame Standardsprache haben. Die Studie war ein Schlag ins Gesicht der Nationalisten, die nach der staatlichen Unabhängigkeit nun versuchen, das Serbokroatische, die Lingua franca der Region, zu begraben und eigene Sprachen zu erfinden."

b. In Croatia, Jezik i nacionalizam was among the five titles nominated for book of the decade in the field of peacebuilding, nonviolence and human rights.
