= Serbo-Croatian phonology =

Serbo-Croatian is a South Slavic language with four national standards. The Eastern Herzegovinian Neo-Shtokavian dialect forms the basis for Bosnian, Croatian, Montenegrin, and Serbian (the four national standards). Standard Serbo-Croatian has 30 phonemes according to the traditional analysis: 25 consonants and 5 vowels (or 10, if long vowels are analysed as distinct phonemes). It features four types of pitch accent, although it is not the characteristics of all dialects.

== Consonants ==
The consonant system of Serbo-Croatian has 25 phonemes. One peculiarity is a presence of both post-alveolar and palatal affricates, but a lack of corresponding palatal fricatives. Unlike most other Slavic languages, there is no palatalized versus non-palatalized (hard–soft) contrast for most consonants.

		Labial	Dental/Alveolar		Retroflex	(Alveolo-) palatal	Velar
		Labial	plain	sibilant	Retroflex	(Alveolo-) palatal	Velar
Nasal		m	n			ɲ	
Plosive/ Affricate	voiceless	p	t	t͡s	t͡ʂ	t͡ɕ	k
Plosive/ Affricate	voiced	b	d		d͡ʐ	d͡ʑ	ɡ
Fricative	voiceless	f		s	ʂ		x
Fricative	voiced	v		z	ʐ		
Approximant	median	v				j	
Approximant	lateral		ɫ			ʎ	
Trill			r				

- /m/ is labiodental [ɱ] before /f, v/, as in tramvaj [trǎɱʋaj], whereas /n/ is velar [ŋ] before /k, ɡ/, as in stanka [stâːŋka].
- /t, d, s, z, t͡s/ are dental, whereas /n, l, r/ are alveolar. /n, l/ become laminal denti-alveolar [n̪], [l̪] before dental consonants.
- /ʎ/ is palato-alveolar [l̻ʲ].
- /v/ is a phonetic fricative, although it has less frication than /f/. However, it does not interact with unvoiced consonants in clusters as a fricative would, and so is considered to be phonologically a sonorant (approximant).
- /t͡s, f, x/ are voiced [d͡z, v, ɣ] before voiced consonants.
- Glottal stop [ʔ] may be inserted between vowels across word boundary, as in i onda [iː ʔônda].
- Croatian has more allophones:
  - /ʃ, ʒ/ are retracted to [ɕ, ʑ] before /t͡ɕ, d͡ʑ/.
  - /x/ is retracted to [h] when it is initial in a consonant cluster, as in hmelj [hmêʎ].

/r/ can be syllabic, short or long, and carry rising or falling tone, e.g. kȓv ('blood'), sȑce ('heart'), sŕna ('deer'), mȉlosr̄đe ('compassion'). It is typically realized by inserting a preceding or succeeding non-phonemic vocalic glide.

/l/ is generally velarized or "dark" [ɫ]. Diachronically, it was fully vocalized into /o/ in coda positions, as in past participle *radil > radio ('worked'). In some dialects, notably Torlakian and Kajkavian, that process did not take place, and /l/ can be syllabic as well. However, in the standard language, vocalic /l/ appears only in loanwords, as in the name for the Czech river Vltava for instance, or debakl, bicikl. Very rarely other sonorants are syllabic, such as /ʎ̩/ in the surname Štarklj and /n̩/ in njutn ('newton').

The retroflex consonants /ʂ, ʐ, tʂ, dʐ/ are, in more detailed phonetic studies, described as apical [ʃ̺, ʒ̺, t̺ʃ̺ʷ, d̺ʒ̺ʷ]. In most spoken Croatian idioms, as well as in some Bosnian, they are postalveolar (/ʃ, ʒ, t͡ʃ, d͡ʒ/) instead, and there could be a complete or partial merger between /tʂ, dʐ/ and palatal affricates /tɕ, dʑ/. where most Croatian and some Bosnian speakers merge the pairs č, ć /tʂ, tɕ/ and dž, đ /dʐ, dʑ/, into [t͡ʃ] and [d͡ʒ].

Alveolo-palatal fricatives [ɕ, ʑ] are marginal phonemes, usually realized as consonant clusters [sj, zj]. However, the emerging Montenegrin standard has proposed two additional letters, Latin ⟨Ś⟩, ⟨Ź⟩ and Cyrillic ⟨С́⟩, ⟨З́⟩, for the phonemic sequences /sj, zj/, which may be realized phonetically as [ɕ, ʑ]. Voicing contrasts are neutralized in consonant clusters, so that all obstruents are either voiced or voiceless depending on the voicing of the final consonant, though this process of voicing assimilation may be blocked by syllable boundaries.

== Vowels ==
Vowel space of Serbo-Croatian from Landau et al. (1999:67). The diphthong /ie/ occurs in some Croatian and Serbian dialects. Schwa [ə] only occurs allophonically.

The Serbo-Croatian vowel system is symmetrically composed of five vowel qualities /a, e, i, o, u/. Although the difference between long and short vowels is phonemic, it is not represented in standard orthography, as it is in Czech or Slovak orthography, except in dictionaries. Unstressed vowels are shorter than the stressed ones by 30% (in the case of short vowels) and 50% (in the case of long vowels).

	Front		Central		Back	
	short	long	short	long	short	long
Close	i	iː			u	uː
Mid	e	eː			o	oː
Open			a	aː		

The long Ijekavian reflex of Proto-Slavic jat is of disputed status. The prescriptive grammar Barić et al. (1997) published by the foremost Croatian normative body—the Institute of Croatian Language and Linguistics, describes it as a diphthong, but this norm has been heavily criticized by phoneticians as having no foundation in the spoken language, the alleged diphthong being called a "phantom phoneme". Thus the reflex of long jat, which is spelled as a trigraph ⟨ije⟩ in standard Croatian, Bosnian and Ijekavian Serbian, represents the sequence /jeː/. Stressed vowels carry one of the two basic tones, rising and falling.

== Pitch accent ==
New Shtokavian dialects (which form the basis of the standard languages) allow two tones on stressed syllables and have distinctive vowel length and so distinguish four combinations, called pitch accent: short falling (ȅ), short rising (è), long falling (ȇ), and long rising (é). Most speakers from Serbia and Croatia do not distinguish between short rising and short falling tones. They also pronounce most unstressed long vowels as short, with some exceptions, such as genitive plural endings. Several Southern Serbian dialects, notably the dialect of Niš, lack vowel length and pitch accent, instead using a stress-based system, as well as differing from the standard language in stress placement. These are considered barbarisms which leads to varying degrees of code switching.

The accent can be on any syllable, but rarely on the last syllable. (Note: Exceptions to this qualification, which is considered by some a prescriptive rule, include: paradàjz ('tomato' nominative sg.), which normally bears a short rising tone on the final syllable in the speech of educated speakers. fabrikànt ('manufacturer' nominative sg.), asistènt ('assistant' nominative sg.), apsolvènt ('student who has fulfilled all requirements except an honours thesis' nominative sg.), trafikànt ('sales assistant at a newsstand' nominative sg.)) This is relevant for Serbia, where educated speakers otherwise speak close to standard Serbian in professional contexts; this is less so in Croatia, where educated speakers often use a local Croatian variant which might have a quite different stress system. For example, even highly educated speakers in Zagreb will have no tones, and can have stress on any syllable.

Accent alternations are very frequent in inflectional paradigms, in both quality and placement in the word (the so-called "mobile paradigms", which were present in Proto-Indo-European itself and became much more widespread in Proto-Balto-Slavic). Different inflected forms of the same lexeme can exhibit all four accents: lònac /ˈlǒnats/ ('pot' nominative sg.), lónca /ˈlǒːntsa/ (genitive singular), lȏnci /ˈlôːntsi/ (nominative plural), lȍnācā /ˈlônaːtsaː/ (genitive plural).

Research done by Pavle Ivić and Ilse Lehiste has shown that all stressed syllables of Serbo-Croatian words are basically spoken with a high tone and that native speakers rely on the phonetic tone of the first post-tonic syllable to judge the pitch accent of any given word. If the high tone of the stressed syllable is carried over to the first post-tonic syllable, the accent is perceived as rising. If it is not, the accent is perceived as falling, which is the reason monosyllabic words are always perceived as falling. Therefore, truly narrow phonetic transcriptions of lònac, lónca, lȏnci and lȍnācā are [ˈlónáts, ˈlóːntsá, ˈlóːntsì, ˈlónàˑtsàˑ] or the equivalent [ˈlo˥nats˥, ˈloːn˥tsa˥, ˈloːn˥tsi˩, ˈlo˥naˑ˩tsaˑ˩]. Transcriptions may also use secondary stress, as in Swedish: [ˈloˌnats, ˈloːnˌtsa, ˈloːntsi, ˈlonaˑtsaˑ].

Ivić and Lehiste were not the first scholars to notice this; in fact, Leonhard Masing made a very similar discovery decades earlier, but it was ignored due to his being a foreigner, and because it contradicted the Vukovian approach, which was then already well-ingrained. Although distinctions of pitch occur only in stressed syllables, unstressed vowels maintain a length distinction. Pretonic syllables are always short, but posttonic syllables may be either short or long. These are traditionally counted as two additional accents. In the standard language, the six accents are realized as follows:

Slavicist symbol	IPA symbol	Description
ȅ	ê	short vowel with falling tone
ȇ	êː	long vowel with falling tone
è	ě	short vowel with rising tone
é	ěː	long vowel with rising tone
e	e	non-tonic short vowel
ē	eː	non-tonic long vowel

Examples are short falling as in nȅbo ('sky') /ˈnêbo/; long falling as in pȋvo ('beer') /ˈpîːvo/; short rising as in màskara ('eye makeup') /ˈmǎskara/; long rising as in čokoláda ('chocolate') /t͡ʂokoˈlǎːda/. Unstressed long syllables can occur only after the accented syllable, as in d(j)èvōjka ('girl') /ˈd(ј)ěvoːjka/ or dòstavljānje ('delivering') /ˈdǒstavʎaːɲe/. There can be more than one post-accent length in a word, notably in genitive plural of nouns: kȍcka ('cubes') → kȍcākā ('cubes''). Realization of the accents varies by region. Restrictions on the distribution of the accent depend, beside the position of the syllable, also on its quality, as not every kind of accent can be manifested in every syllable.

1. Falling tone generally occurs in monosyllabic words or the first syllable of a word (pȃs ('belt'), rȏg ('horn'); bȁba ('old woman'), lȃđa ('river ship'); kȕćica ('small house'), Kȃrlovac. The only exception to this rule are interjections, words uttered in the state of excitement (such as ahȁ, ohȏ)
2. Rising tone generally occurs in any syllable of a word except the last one and so never occurs in monosyllabics (vòda 'water', lúka 'harbour'; lìvada 'meadow', lúpānje 'slamming'; siròta 'orphan', počétak 'beginning'; crvotòčina 'wormhole', oslobođénje 'liberation'). Thus, monosyllabics generally have falling tone, and polysyllabics generally have falling or rising tone on the first syllable and rising in all the other syllables but the last one. The tonal opposition rising ~ falling is hence generally possible only in the first accented syllable of polysyllabic words, and the opposition by lengths, long ~ short, is possible in the accented syllable, as well as in the postaccented syllables (but not in a preaccented position).

Proclitics, clitics that latch on to a following word, on the other hand, may "steal" a falling tone (but not a rising tone) from the following monosyllabic or disyllabic word. The stolen accent is always short and may end up being either falling or rising on the proclitic. The phenomenon (accent shift to proclitic) is most frequent in the spoken idioms of Bosnia, as in Serbian it is more limited (normally with the negation proclitic ne) and it is almost absent from Croatian Neo-Shtokavian idioms. Such a shift is less frequent for short rising accents than for the falling one (as seen in this example: /ʒěliːm/ → /ne ʒěliːm/).

	in isolation		with proclitic			Translation
	in isolation		Croatian	Serbian	Bosnian	Translation
rising	/ʒěliːm/	'I want'	/neʒěliːm/			'I don't want'
rising	/zǐːma/	'winter'	/uzîːmu/		/ûziːmu/	'in the winter'
rising	/nemoɡǔːtɕnoːst/	'inability'	/unemoɡǔːtɕnosti/			'not being able to'
falling	/vîdiːm/	'I see'	/něvidiːm/			'I can't see'
falling	/ɡrâːd/	'city'	/uɡrâːd/		/ûɡraːd/	'to the city' (stays falling)
falling	/ʃûma/	'forest'	/uʃûmi/		/ǔʃumi/	'in the forest' (becomes rising)

== Morphophonemic alternations ==
Serbo-Croatian exhibits a number of morphophonological alternations. Some of them are inherited from Proto-Slavic and are shared with other Slavic languages, and some of them are exclusive to Serbo-Croatian, representing later innovation.

=== Fleeting a ===
The so-called "fleeting a" (Serbo-Croatian: nepóstojānō a), or "movable a", refers to the phenomenon of short /a/ making apparently random appearance and loss in certain inflected forms of nouns. This is a result of different types of reflexes Common Slavic jers */ъ/ and */ь/, which in Štokavian and Čakavian dialects merged to one schwa-like sound, which was lost in a weak position and vocalized to */a/ in a strong position, giving rise to what is apparently unpredictable alternation. In most of the cases, this has led to such /a/ appearing in word forms ending in consonant clusters, but not in forms with vowel ending.

The "fleeting a" is most common in the following cases:

- in nominative singular, accusative singular for animate nouns, and genitive plural for certain type of masculine nouns:
  bórac ('fighter' nom. sg.) – bórca (gen. sg.) – bȏrācā (gen. pl.)
  mòmak ('young man' nom. sg.) – mòmka (gen. sg.) – momákā (gen. pl.)
  stòlac ('chair' nom. sg.) – stólca (gen. sg.) – stȍlācā (gen. pl.)
- in genitive plural forms of feminine nouns ending in a consonant cluster:
  dàska ('board') – dasákā, sèstra ('sister') – sestárā, bȁčva ('barrel') – bȁčāvā
- in nominative singular indefinite masculine forms of adjectives and pronouns:
  kràtak ('short') – kràtkī, kàkāv ('what kind of') – kàkvi, sȁv ('entire') – svȉ

=== Palatalization ===
The reflex of the Slavic first palatalization was retained in Serbo-Croatian as an alternation of

/k/ → /t͡ʂ/
/ɡ/ → /ʐ/
/x/ → /ʂ/

before /e/ in inflection, and before /j, i, e/ and some other segments in word formation. This alternation is prominently featured in several characteristic cases:

- in vocative singular of masculine nouns, where it is triggered by the ending -e:
  jùnāk ('hero') → jȕnāče, vrȃg ('devil') → vrȃže, òrah ('walnut') → òraše. It is, however, not caused by the same ending -e in accusative plural: junáke, vrȃge, (Note: This is a stylistically marked form: the usual plural form of vrȃg is with -ov- interfix: vrȁgovi; accusative plural: vrȁgove, but the infix is inhibiting the environment conditioning the palatalization, so the short plural form was provided.) òrahe.
- in the present stem of certain verbs before the endings in -e:
  - pȅći ('to bake') – present stem pèk-; pèčēm ('I bake'), but pèkū ('they bake') without palatalization before the 3rd person plural ending -u
  - strȉći ('to shear') – present stem stríg-; strížem ('I shear'), but strígū ('they shear') without palatalization before the 3rd person plural ending -u
  - mȍći ('can') – present stem mog-; mȍžeš ('you can'), but mògu ('I can'), without the palatalization before the archaic 1st person singular ending -u
- in aorist formation of some verbs:
  - rȅći ('to say') – rèkoh ('I said' aorist), as opposed to rȅče (2nd/3rd person singular aorist)
  - stȉći ('to arrive') – stȉgoh ('I arrived' 1st person singular aorist), as opposed to stȉže (2nd/3rd person singular aorist)
- in derivation of certain classes of nouns and verbs:
  - mȕka ('torment') → mȕčiti ('to torment'); zrȃk ('air') → zráčiti ('to air'), trȃg ('trace') → trážiti ('to seek')
  - slúga ('servant') → slúžiti ('to serve'), njȗh ('the sense of smell') → njȕšiti ('to smell')
- before the "fleeting a", and before the endings -an, -ji and several others:
  - dȃh ('breath') → dášak ('puff'), Kartága ('Carthage') → Kartážanin ('Carthaginian'), bȏg ('god') → bȍžjī ('god's'), strȃh ('fear') → strášan ('fearsome')
- a few words exhibit palatalization in which /ts/ and /z/ palatalize before vowels /e/ and /i/, yielding /ʂ/ and /ʐ/. Such palatals have often been leveled out in various derived forms. For example:
  - strȋc ('uncle') – strȋče ('uncle!') – stríčev ('uncle's'), lòvac ('hunter') – lȏvče ('hunter!') – lóvčev ('hunter's'), zȇc ('hare') – zȇče ('hare!') – zȅčevi ('hares'), ȕlica ('street') – ȕličica ('alley'), ptȉca ('bird') – ptȉčica ('small bird') – ptičùrina ('big bird')
  - vȉtēz ('knight') – vȉtēže ('knight!'), knȇz ('prince') – knȇže ('prince!')

There are some exceptions to the process of palatalization. The conditions are:

- before the diminutive suffix -ica
  - mȁčka ('cat') → mȁčkica ('kitten'), p(j)ȅga ('freckle') → p(j)ȅgica ('small freckle'), bùha ('flea') → bùhica ('small flea')
- before the possessive suffix -in in adjectives derived from hypocoristic nouns:
  - báka ('grandma') → bákīn ('grandma's'), zéko ('bunny') → zékīn ('bunny's'), máca ('kitty') → mácin ('kitty's')

Doublets exist with adjectives derived with suffix -in from trisyllabic proper names:

- Dànica → Dàničin : Dànicin, Ȉvica → Ȉvičin : Ȉvicin, Ànkica → Ànkičin : Ànkicin

=== Sibilantization ===
The output of the second and the third Slavic palatalization is in the Serbo-Croatian grammar tradition known as "sibilantization" (sibilarizácija/сибилариза́ција). It results in the following alternations before /i/:

/k/ → /ts/
/ɡ/ → /z/
/x/ → /s/

This alternation is prominently featured in several characteristic cases:

- in the imperative forms of verbs with stem ending in /k/, /ɡ/ and one verb in /x/:
  - pȅći ('to bake' present stem) pèk-; pèci ('bake!' 2nd person singular imperative)
  - strȉći ('to shear' present stem) stríg-; strízi ('shear!' 2nd person singular imperative)
  - vȓći ('to thresh' present stem) vŕh-; vŕsi ('thresh!' 2nd person singular imperative)
- in masculine nominative plurals with the ending -i:
  - jùnāk ('hero') → junáci
  - kr̀čag ('jug') → kr̀čazi
  - prȍpūh ('draught [of air]') → prȍpūsi
- in dative and locative singular of a-stem nouns (prevalently feminine):
  - mȃjka ('mother') → mȃjci
  - nòga ('leg') → nòzi
  - snàha ('daughter-in-law') → snàsi
- in dative, locative and instrumental plural of masculine o-stems:
  - jùnāk ('hero') → junácima
  - kr̀čag ('jug') → kr̀čazima
- in the formation of imperfective verbs to perfective verbs:
  - dȉgnuti ('to lift') – dȉzati ('to do lifting')
  - uzdàhnuti ('to sigh') – ùzdisati ('to do sighing') but first-person singular present: ùzdišēm ('I sigh')

In two cases there is an exception to sibilantization:

- in nominative singular of masculine nouns:
  - in monosyllabic borrowings:
    Bȁsk ('Basque') →Bȁski, brȍnh ('bronchus') → brȍnhi, ȅrg → ȅrgi
  - in anthroponyms in plural form, usually from a region where Kajkavian dialect is spoken:
    Čȅhi ('Czechs'), Nȍvāki ('Novaks')
  - some surnames that are not identical to some general noun of the standard language:
    Srȅćko → Srȅćki, Zelénko → Zelénki
  - with nouns having 'fleeting a' in the ending -cak
    nátucak → nátucki
- in dative and locative case of feminine and masculine a-stems
  - in hypocorisms:
    báka ('grandmother') → báki, séka ('little sister') → séki, bráco ('little brother') →bráci, zéko ('bunny') → zéki, stríko ('uncle [affectionate]') → stríki
  - in words whose stem ends in a single consonant:
    dȅka ('blanket') →dȅki, kȕka ('hook') →kȕki, koléga ('colleague') →kolégi, pjȅga ('freckle') →pjȅgi, zȃliha ('supply') →zȃlihi
  - in names and surnames
    Jȇlka → Jȇlki, Lȗka → Lȗki, Jȁdrānka → Jȁdrānki
  - in nouns ending in -cka, -čka, -ćka, -ska, -tka, -zga:
    kȍcka ('cube') →kȍcki, tȍčka ('point') →tȍčki, prȁćka ('sling') →prȁćki, pljȕska ('slap') →pljȕski, pȁtka ('duck') →pȁtki, màzga ('mule') →màzgi
  - in many toponyms:
    Kȑka → Kȑki, Kartága ('Carthage') → Kartági
  - in nouns ending in suffix -ka with stem-final sonorant:
    intelektùālka ('an intellectual' feminine) →intelektùālki, kàjkāvka ('Kajkavian speaker' feminine) →kàjkāvki, srednjòškōlka ('high school girl') →srednjòškōlki

Doublets are allowed in the following cases:

- nominative plural of some masculine borrowings:
  flamìngo → flamìnzi : flamìngi
- in nominative plural of surnames who are identical with some general masculine noun:
  Bȅg → Bȅgi : Bȅzi, Dȕh → Dȕhi : Dȕsi
- in nominative plural of masculine nouns with "fleeting a" and the ending -čak, -ćak or -đak
  máčak ('cat' masculine) →máčki : máčci, òplećak ('ephod') →òplećki : òplećci, omeđak → omećki : omećci
- in dative and locative of some feminine toponyms with stem ending in a single consonant:
  Líka → Líci : Líki
- in dative and locative of some toponyms ending in -ska, -ška:
  Àljaska ('Alaska') → Àljaski : Àljasci, Gràdiška → Gràdiški : Gràdišci
- in dative and locative of some feminines ending in -ska, -tka, -vka:
  gȕska ('goose') →gȕski : gȕsci, bȉtka ('battle') →bȉtki : bȉ(t)ci, trȃvka ('blade of grass') → trȃvci : trȃvki

=== Assimilation ===
There are two types of consonant assimilation: by voicing (jednačenje po zvučnosti) and by place of articulation (jednačenje po m(j)estu tvorbe).

==== Assimilation of voice ====
All consonants in clusters are neutralized by voicing, but Serbo-Croatian does not exhibit final-obstruent devoicing as most other Slavic languages do. Assimilation is practically always regressive, i.e. voicing of the group is determined by voicing of the last consonant. Sonorants are exempted from assimilation, so it affects only the following consonants:

- /b/ ↔ /p/
  kobac ('hawk') →kobca : kopca (nominative → genitive, with fleeting a)
  top ('cannon') + džija → topdžija : tobdžija ('cannonman')
- /ɡ/ ↔ /k/
  burek ('burek') + džija → burekdžija : buregdžija ('burek-baker')
- /d/ ↔ /t/
  pod- ('under-') + platiti ('pay') → podplatiti : potplatiti ('to bribe')
- /d͡ʐ/ ↔ /t͡ʂ/
  vrač ('sorcerer') + -bina → vračbina : vradžbina ('witchcraft')
  uč- ('learn-') + -benik → učbenik : udžbenik ('textbook')
- /ʒ/ ↔ /ʃ/
  težak ('heavy') →težki : teški (singular → plural, with fleeting a)
- /z/ ↔ /s/
  uzak ('narrow') →uzki : uski (singular → plural, with fleeting a)
  s- ('off-') + baciti ('throw') →sbaciti : zbaciti ('throw off')
- /n/ ↔ /m/
  stan ('apartment') →stanbena zgrada : stambena zgrada ('apartment building')

Furthermore, /f/, /x/ and /ts/ don't have voiced counterparts, so they trigger the assimilation, but are not affected by it.

As can be seen from the examples above, assimilation is generally reflected in orthography. However, there are numerous orthographic exceptions, i.e. even if voicing or devoicing does take place in speech, the orthography does not record it, usually to maintain the etymology clearer.

==== Assimilation by place of articulation ====
Assimilation by place of articulation affects /s/ and /z/ in front of (post)alveolars /ʃ/, /ʒ/, /t͡ʂ/, /d͡ʐ/, /tɕ/, /dʑ/, as well as palatals /ʎ/ and /ɲ/, producing /ʃ/ or /ʒ/:

- /s/ → /ʃ/
  pas ('dog') + -če → pašče ('small dog')
  list ('leaf') + -je → listće : lisće : lišće ('leaves')
  prositi ('to beg') + -nja → prosnja : prošnja ('begging')
  snositi ('to bear') + -ljiv → snosljiv : snošljiv ('bearable')
- /z/ → /ʒ/
  miraz ('dowry') + -džika → mirazdžika : miraždžika ('girl with dowry')
  grozd ('grape bunch') + -je → grozđe : grožđe ('grapes')
  paziti ('to care') + -nja → paznja : pažnja ('care')
  paziti ('to care') + -ljiv → pazljiv : pažljiv ('careful')

Simultaneously, assimilation by voicing is triggered if necessary.

=== L-vocalization ===
A historical /l/ in coda position has become /o/ and is now so spelled, and produces an additional syllable. For example, the Serbo-Croatian name of Belgrade is Beograd. However, in Croatian, the process is partially reversed; compare Croatian stol, vol, sol vs. Serbian sto, vo, so ('table', 'ox' and 'salt').

== Sample ==
The sample text is a reading of the first sentence of The North Wind and the Sun by a 57-year-old female announcer at the Croatian Television Network reading in a colloquial style.

=== Phonemic transcription ===
/sjêʋeːrniː ɫědeniː ʋjêtar i sûːnt͡se su se prěpiraɫi o sʋǒjo:j snǎːzi/

=== Phonetic transcription ===
[sjêʋeˑrniˑ ɫědeniˑ ʋjêtar i sûːnt͡se su se prěpiraɫi o sʋǒjoˑj snǎːzi]

=== Orthographic versions (Ijekavian) ===
Latin script
Sjeverni ledeni vjetar i Sunce su se prepirali o svojoj snazi.
Cyrillic script
Сјеверни ледени вјетар и Сунце су се препирали о својој снази.

== See also ==
- Differences between Serbo-Croatian standard varieties
- IPA/Serbo-Croatian
- Language secessionism in Serbo-Croatian
- Pluricentric Serbo-Croatian language
- Serbo-Croatian grammar
- Serbo-Croatian kinship
- Serbo-Croatian relative clauses
- South Slavic dialect continuum
- Standard language
- Montenegrin alphabet

== Literature ==
- Alexander, Ronelle (2006). Bosnian/Croatian/Serbian – A Grammar with Sociolinguistic Commentary. The University of Wisconsin Press. ISBN 978-0-299-21194-3.
- Barić, Eugenija; Lončarić, Mijo; Malić, Dragica; Znika, Marija; Zečević, Vesna; Pavešić, Slavko; Peti, Mirko (1997). Hrvatska gramatika (in Serbo-Croatian). Školska knjiga. ISBN 953-0-40010-1.
- Browne, Wayles (1993). "Serbo-Croat". In Comrie, Bernard; Corbett, Greville G. (eds.). The Slavonic languages. London: Routledge. ISBN 978-0-415-28078-5.
- Ćavar, Małgorzata E. (2011). "Merger of the place contrast in the posterior sibilants in Croatian" ( (PDF)). Potsdam Linguistic Investigations. Archived from the original on 2016-03-04.
- Gick, Bryan; Campbell, Fiona; Oh, Sunyoung; Tamburri-Watt, Linda (2006). "Toward universals in the gestural organization of syllables: A cross-linguistic study of liquids". Journal of Phonetics. 34 (1). Vancouver: Department of Linguistics, University of British Columbia: 49–72. doi:10.1016/j.wocn.2005.03.005.
- Jazić, Đorđe (1977). Osnovi fonetike ruskog jezika: ruski glasovni sistem u poređenju sa srpskohrvatskim. Beograd: Naučna knjiga.
- Jovanović Maldoran, Srđan (2014). "Prilog izučavanju akcenatskog kvaliteta i kvantiteta srpske varijante policentričnog srpskohrvatskog jezika" [To the study of Accentual Quality and Quantity of Serbian Version of the Polycentric Serbo-Croatian Language]. Slavia: časopis pro slovanskou filologii (in Serbo-Croatian). 83 (2). Prague: 179–185. ISSN 0037-6736. ZDB-ID 204528-x.
- Kapović, Mate (2007). "Hrvatski standard – evolucija ili revolucija? Problem hrvatskoga pravopisa i pravogovora". Jezikoslovlje (in Serbo-Croatian). 8 (1): 61–76.
- Kordić, Snježana (2006) [1st pub. 1997]. Serbo-Croatian. Languages of the World/Materials; 148. Munich & Newcastle: Lincom Europa. ISBN 3-89586-161-8. OCLC 37959860. OL 2863538W. CROSBI 426503. [Grammar book]. Contents. Summary Archived 2020-08-06 at the Wayback Machine
- Ladefoged, Peter; Maddieson, Ian (1996). The Sounds of the World's Languages. Oxford: Blackwell. ISBN 0-631-19815-6.
- Landau, Ernestina; Lončarić, Mijo; Horga, Damir; Škarić, Ivo (1999). "Croatian". Handbook of the International Phonetic Association: A guide to the use of the International Phonetic Alphabet (PDF). Cambridge: Cambridge University Press. pp. 66–69. ISBN 0-521-65236-7.
- Lehiste, Ilse; Ivić, Pavle (1963). Accent in Serbocroatian: an experimental study. Michigan Slavic Publications. ISBN 978-0-936534-11-4.
- Lehiste, Ilse; Ivić, Pavle (1986). Word and sentence prosody in Serbocroatian. MIT Press. ISBN 0262121115.
- Magner, Thomas F. (1998). Introduction to the Croatian and Serbian Language. Pennsylvania State University Press.
- Morén, Bruce (August 2006). "Consonant-Vowel Interactions in Serbian: Features, Representations and Constraint Interactions" (PDF). Lingua. 116 (8): 1198–1244. doi:10.1016/j.lingua.2005.04.003. Archived from the original (PDF) on 2015-05-04.
- Petrović, Dragoljub; Gudurić, Snežana (2010). Fonologija srpskoga jezika. Belgrade: Institut za srpski jezik SANU. ISBN 978-86-7590-256-0.
