= Serbo-Croatian grammar =

Serbo-Croatian is a South Slavic language that, like most other Slavic languages, has an extensive system of inflection. This article describes exclusively the grammar of the Shtokavian dialect, which is a part of the South Slavic dialect continuum and the basis for the Bosnian, Croatian, Montenegrin, and Serbian standard variants of Serbo-Croatian. "An examination of all the major 'levels' of language shows that BCS is clearly a single language with a single grammatical system."

Pronouns, nouns, adjectives and some numerals decline (change the word ending to reflect case, the grammatical category and function) whereas verbs conjugate for person and tense. As in other Slavic languages, the basic word order is subject–verb–object (SVO), but the declensions show sentence structure and so word order is not as important as in more analytic languages, such as English or Chinese. Deviations from the standard SVO order are stylistically marked and may be employed to convey a particular emphasis, mood or overall tone, according to the intentions of the speaker or writer. Often, such deviations will sound literary, poetical or archaic.

Nouns have three grammatical genders (masculine, feminine and neuter) that correspond, to a certain extent, with the word ending. Accordingly, most nouns with -a are feminine, -o and -e neuter, and the rest mostly masculine but with some feminine. The grammatical gender of a noun affects the morphology of other parts of speech (adjectives, pronouns, and verbs) attached to it. Nouns are declined into seven cases: nominative, genitive, dative, accusative, vocative, locative, and instrumental, albeit with considerable syncretism (overlap) especially in the plural.

Verbs are divided into two broad classes according to their aspect, which can be either perfective (signifying a completed action) or imperfective (action is incomplete or repetitive). There are seven tenses, four of which (present, perfect, future I and II) are used in contemporary Serbo-Croatian, and the other three (aorist, imperfect and pluperfect) used much less frequently. The pluperfect is generally limited to written language and some more educated speakers, and the aorist and imperfect are considered stylistically marked and rather archaic. However, some nonstandard dialects make considerable (and thus unmarked) use of those tenses. Aorist and pluperfect are typically more used in villages and small towns of Serbia than in standard language, even in villages close to the Serbian capital Belgrade. In some parts of Serbia, the aorist can even be the most common past tense.

All Serbo-Croatian lexemes in this article are spelled in accented form in the Latin alphabet as well as in Ijekavian and Ekavian (with Ijekavian bracketed) when these differ. See Serbo-Croatian phonology.

== Nouns ==
Serbo-Croatian makes a distinction between three genders (masculine, feminine and neuter), seven cases (nominative, genitive, dative, accusative, vocative, locative, instrumental), and two numbers (singular and plural).

The dative and locative cases mostly coincide; however, in some nouns they have a different pitch accent: grȃd — grȃdu — grádu, stvȃr — stvȃri — stvári.

=== Declension ===
Serbo-Croatian has three main declensional types, traditionally called a-type, e-type and i-type respectively, according to their genitive singular ending.

==== a-type nouns ====
This type reflects Proto-Slavic o-stems, and is characterized by the endings (-o), (-e), or zero (-Ø) in the nominative singular, and (-a) in genitive singular. It includes most of the masculine and all of the neuter nouns.

The category of animacy is important for choosing of accusative singular of o-stems, and of personal pronouns. Animate nouns have the accusative case like the genitive, and inanimate nouns have the accusative case like the nominative. This is also important for adjectives and numerals that agree with masculine nouns in case.

This type has two sets of case endings: one for masculine, and the other for neuter gender:

Case	Singular		Plural	
Case	masculine	neuter	masculine	neuter
Nominative (N)	-Ø, -o, -e	-o, -e, -Ø	-i, -ov-i, -ev-i	-a
Genitive (G)	-a	-a	-ā, -ōv-ā, -ēv-ā	-ā
Dative (D)	-u	-u	-ima, -ov-ima, -ev-ima	-ima
Accusative (A)	=N or G	=N	-e, -ov-e, -ev-e	=N
Vocative (V)	-e, -u, or =N	=N	=N	=N
Locative (L)	=D	=D	=D	=D
Instrumental (I)	-om, -em	-om, -em	=D	=D

The zero ending -Ø is for masculine nouns that end in a consonant in the nominative singular. Most masculine monosyllabic and some bisyllabic words receive an additional suffix -ov- or -ev- throughout the plural (bor – borovi 'pine', panj – panjevi 'stump').

The choice of -o- and -e- endings in the nominative, vocative and instrumental singular, as well as the plural suffix -ov-/-ev-, is governed by the stem-final consonant: if it is a "soft" (chiefly palatal consonant – c, č, ć, đ, j, lj, nj, š, ž, št, and sometimes r), -e- endings are used, and -o endings otherwise; however, there are exceptions.

Some loanwords, chiefly of French origin, preserve the ending vowel (-e, -i, -o, -u) as part of the stem; those ending in -i receive an additional epenthetic -j- suffix in oblique cases: kàfē – kafèi 'café', pànō – panòi 'billboard', kànū – kanùi 'canoe', tàksi – taksiji 'taxi'. They are always of masculine gender; loanwords ending in -a are typically of the e-declension class (feminine); neuter nouns are basically a closed class.

===== Masculine nouns =====
Masculine nouns belonging to this declension class are those that are not hypocorisms, and do not end in -a, which undergo e-type declension.

According to the nominative singular forms they are divided in two classes:

1. nouns having the zero ending -Ø in nominative singular (twelve declensional patterns)
2. nouns having the ending -o or -e in nominative singular (two declensional patterns)

Pattern 1 – Nouns without "disappearing a"
Case	Singular	Plural
N	ìzvor	ìzvor-i
G	ìzvor-a	ȉzvōr-ā
D	ìzvor-u	ìzvor-ima
A	ìzvor	ìzvor-e
V	ìzvor-e	ìzvor-i
L	ìzvor-u	ìzvor-ima
I	ìzvor-om	ìzvor-ima

Pattern 2 – Nouns with "disappearing a"
Case	Singular	Plural
N	nȍk-a-t	nȍkt-i
G	nȍkt-a	nȍk-ā-t-ā
D	nȍkt-u	nȍkt-ima
A	nȍk-a-t	nȍkt-e
V	nȍkt-e	nȍkt-i
L	nòkt-u	nȍkt-ima
I	nȍkt-om	nȍkt-ima

Pattern 3 – Nouns ending in -in
Case	Singular	Plural
N	grȁđan-in	grȁđan-i
G	grȁđan-in-a	grȁđān-ā̄
D	grȁđan-in-u	grȁđan-ima
A	grȁđan-in-a	grȁđan-e
V	grȁđan-in-e	grȁđan-i
L	grȁđan-in-u	grȁđan-ima
I	grȁđan-in-om	grȁđan-ima

Pattern 4	Nouns ending in -k		Nouns ending in -g		Nouns ending in -h	
Case	Singular	Plural	Singular	Plural	Singular	Plural
N	vòjnīk	vojníc-i	bùbreg	bùbrez-i	tr̀buh	tr̀bus-i
G	vojník-a	vojník-ā̄	bùbreg-a	bȕbrēg-ā̄	tr̀buh-a	tȑbūh-ā̄
D	vojník-u	vojníc-ima	bùbreg-u	bùbrez-ima	tr̀buh-u	tr̀bus-ima
A	vojník-a	vojník-e	bùbreg	bùbreg-e	tr̀buh	tr̀buh-e
V	vȍjnīč-e	vojníc-i	bùbrež-e	bùbrez-i	tr̀buš-e	tr̀bus-i
L	vojník-u	vojníc-ima	bùbreg-u	bùbrez-ima	tr̀buh-u	tr̀bus-ima
I	vojník-om	vojníc-ima	bùbreg-om	bùbrez-ima	tr̀buh-om	tr̀bus-ima

Pattern 5 – Nouns ending in -(a)k
Case	Singular	Plural
N	čvór-a-k	čvórc-i
G	čvórk-a	čvȏr-ā-k-ā̄
D	čvórk-u	čvórc-ima
A	čvórk-a	čvórk-e
V	čvȏrč-e	čvórc-i
L	čvórk-u	čvórc-ima
I	čvórk-om	čvórc-ima

Pattern 6 – Nouns ending in a palatal
Case	Singular	Plural	Singular	Plural	Singular	Plural
N	pȃnj	pánj-ev-i	sȗž-a-nj	sȗžnj-i	prȋšt	príšt-ev-i
G	pánj-a	pánj-ēv-ā̄	sȗžnj-a	sȗž-ā-nj-ā̄	príšt-a	príšt-ēv-ā̄
D	pánj-u	pánj-ev-ima	sȗžnj-u	sȗžnj-ima	príšt-u	príšt-ev-ima
A	pȃnj	pánj-ev-e	sȗžnj-a	sȗžnj-e	prȋšt	príšt-ev-e
V	pȃnj-u	pánj-ev-i	sȗžnj-u	sȗžnj-i	prȋšt-u	príšt-ev-i
L	pánj-u	pánj-ev-ima	sȗžnj-u	sȗžnj-ima	príšt-u	príšt-ev-ima
I	pánj-em	pánj-ev-ima	sȗžnj-em	sȗžnj-ima	príšt-em	príšt-ev-ima

Pattern 7 – Nouns ending in -c
Case	Singular	Plural	Singular	Plural
N	strȋc	stríč-ev-i	klȉn-a-c	klȋnc-i
G	stríc-a	stríč-ēv-ā̄	klȋnc-a	klȉn-ā-c-ā
D	stríc-u	stríč-ev-ima	klȋnc-u	klȋnc-ima
A	stríc-a	stríč-ev-e	klȉn-a-c	klȋnc-e
V	strȋč-e	stríč-ev-i	klȋnč-e	klȋnc-i
L	stríc-u	stríč-ev-ima	klȋnc-u	klȋnc-ima
I	stríc-em	stríč-ev-ima	klȋnc-em	klȋnc-ima

Pattern 8 – Nouns ending in -lac
Case	Singular	Plural
N	posjètil-a-c	posjètioc-i
G	posjètioc-a	posjètil-ā-c-ā̄
D	posjètioc-u	posjètioc-ima
A	posjètioc-a	posjètioc-e
V	posjètioč-e	posjètioc-i
L	posjètioc-u	posjètioc-ima
I	posjètioc-em	posjètioc-ima

Pattern 9 – Nouns ending in -o
Case	Singular	Plural	Singular	Plural
N	pȅpeo	pȅpel-i	ȕgao	ȕgl-ov-i
G	pȅpel-a	pȅpēl-ā	ȕgl-a	ȕgl-ov-ā̄
D	pȅpel-u	pȅpel-ima	ȕgl-u	ȕgl-ov-ima
A	pȅpeo	pȅpel-e	ȕg-a-o	ȕgl-ov-e
V	pȅpel-e	pȅpel-i	ȕgl-e	ȕgl-ov-i
L	pȅpel-u	pȅpel-ima	ȕgl-u	ȕgl-ov-ima
I	pȅpel-om	pȅpel-ima	ȕgl-om	ȕgl-ov-ima

Pattern 10 – The noun čȍv(j)ek
Case	Singular	Plural
N	čȍv(j)ek	ljȗd-i
G	čȍv(j)ek-a	ljúd-ī
D	čȍv(j)ek-u	ljúd-ima
A	čȍv(j)ek-a	ljȗd-e
V	čȍv(j)eč-e	ljȗd-i
L	čȍv(j)ek-u	ljúd-ima
I	čȍv(j)ek-om	ljúd-ima

Masculine nouns ending in -o or -e present a special case. They generally comprise personal names, hypocorisms and certain foreign-language borrowings.

Pattern 11 – Nouns in -ē or -o
Case	Singular	Plural
N	bìfē	bifè-i
G	bifè-a	bifé-ā
D	bifè-u	bifè-ima
A	bìfē	bifè-e
V	bȉfe-u	bifè-i
L	bifè-u	bifè-ima
I	bifè-om	bifè-ima

Pattern 12 – Nouns ending in -i
Case	Singular	Plural	Singular	Plural
N	žìrī	žirìj-i	tàksi	tàksij-i
G	žirìj-a	žiríj-ā	tàksij-a	tàksij-ā
D	žirìj-u	žirìj-ima	tàksij-u	tàksij-ima
A	žìrī	žirìj-e	tàksi	tàksij-e
V	žȉrij-u	žirìj-i	tàksij-u	tàksij-i
L	žirìj-u	žirìj-ima	tàksij-u	tàksij-ima
I	žirìj-em	žirìj-ima	tàksij-em	tàksij-ima

Pattern 13 – Personal names
Case	Non-palatal paradigm	Palatal paradigm
N	Dànil-o	Hȑvoj-e
G	Dànil-a	Hȑvoj-a
D	Dànil-u	Hȑvoj-u
A	Dànil-a	Hȑvoj-a
V	Dànil-o	Hȑvoj-e
L	Dànil-u	Hȑvoj-u
I	Dànil-om	Hȑvoj-em

Pattern 14 – Hypocorisms ending in -ko
Case	Non-palatal paradigm	Palatal paradigm
N	raščupànk-o	raščupànc-i
G	raščupànk-a	raščupán-ā-k-ā
D	raščupànk-u	raščupànc-ima
A	raščupànk-a	raščupànk-e
V	rȁščupank-o	raščupànc-i
L	raščupànk-u	raščupànc-ima
I	raščupànk-om	raščupànc-ima

==== Neuter nouns ====
Neuter nouns end in -o, -e and -∅.

===== Neuter nouns ending in -o =====
The final o is always a suffix. Nouns which have at least two consonants (except st and zd) before the final o have disappearing a in genitive plural.

Pattern 1 – Parisyllabic nouns without disappearing a
Case	Singular	Plural
N	kòl(j)en-o	kòl(j)en-a
G	kòl(j)en-a	kȍl(j)ēn-ā
D	kòl(j)en-u	kòl(j)en-ima
A	kòl(j)en-o	kòl(j)en-a
V	kòl(j)en-o	kòl(j)en-a
L	kòl(j)en-u	kòl(j)en-ima
I	kòl(j)en-om	kòl(j)en-ima

Pattern 2 – Parisyllabic nouns with disappearing a
Case	Singular	Plural
N	jȅdr-o/jèdr-o	jèdr-a
G	jȅdr-a	jȅd-ā-r-ā
D	jȅdr-u	jèdr-ima
A	jȅdr-o	jèdr-a
V	jȅdr-o	jèdr-a
L	jȅdr-u	jèdr-ima
I	jȅdr-om	jèdr-ima

The noun dȑvo can mean 'wood', in which case it is declined as above (without disappearing a); and 'tree', where it can be declined either as above (without disappearing a) or as an imparisyllabic form below:

Pattern 3
Case	Singular	Plural
N	dȑv-o	drv-èt-a
G	dȑv-et-a	drv-èt-ā
D	dȑv-et-u	drv-èt-ima
A	dȑv-o	drv-èt-a
V	dȑv-o	drv-èt-a
L	dȑv-et-u	drv-èt-ima
I	dȑv-et-om	drv-èt-ima

When the nouns ȍko and ȕho mean 'eye' and 'ear', except after a number ending with two-to-four, their plurals are feminine; their plurals are neuter otherwise.

Pattern 4 – Feminine plural
Case	Plural
N	ȍč-i
G	òč-ijū
D	òč-ima
A	ȍč-i
V	ȍč-i
L	òč-ima
I	òč-ima

Pattern 4 – Neuter plural
Case	Plural
N	ȍk-a
G	ôk-ā
D	òč-ima
A	ȍk-a
V	ȍk-a
L	òč-ima
I	òč-ima

Nouns čȕdo 'miracle', kȍlo 'wheel', nȅbo 'sky', t(ij)êlo 'body' and ȕho 'ear', in addition to parisyllabic form plurals without disappearing a, have imparisyllabic plurals formed by appending -es- to the base. These plurals are used differently. The nominative plural of ȕho is ušèsa, and the nominative plural of t(ij)êlo is t(j)elèsa.

Pattern 5 – Nouns with -es-
Case	Plural
N	čud-ès-a
G	čud-és-ā
D	čud-ès-ima
A	čud-ès-a
V	čud-ès-a
L	čud-ès-ima
I	čud-ès-ima

===== Neuter nouns ending in -e =====
The final e can be a suffix, so the noun is parisyllabic, and it can belong to the noun base, in which case the noun is not parisyllabic. The noun is parisyllabic if it ends with -je (except jáje in singular), -lje, -nje (except jȁnje), -će, -đe, -ce (except pȕce and tùce), -šte, -šće or -žđe. The nouns môre and tlȅ are also parisyllabic. If a noun has at least two consonants before the final e, it has a disappearing a in genitive plural. This is not the case if the noun ends with -šte, -šće, -žđe or -je. Nouns representing living things do not have plural forms, but their plurality is marked with a collective noun formed with -ād (téle, n. sg. singulare tantum → tȅlād, f. sg. singulare tantum) or by using a noun formed with -ići (pȉle, n. sg. singulare tantum → pȉlići, m. pl.). The noun d(ij)éte 'child' is a singulare tantum and uses the collective noun d(j)èca, f. sg. singulare tantum, but plural with verbs, instead of a plural form.

Pattern 6 – Parisyllabic nouns without disappearing a
Case	Singular	Plural
N	pȍlj-e	pȍlj-a/pòlj-a
G	pȍlj-a	pôlj-ā
D	pȍlj-u	pȍlj-ima
A	pȍlj-e	pȍlj-a
V	pȍlj-e	pȍlj-a
L	pȍlj-u	pȍlj-ima
I	pȍlj-em	pȍlj-ima

Pattern 7 – Parisyllabic nouns with disappearing a
Case	Singular	Plural
N	sûnc-e	sûnc-a
G	sûnc-a	sûnc-ā/sȕn-ā-c-ā
D	sûnc-u	sûnc-ima
A	sûnc-e	sûnc-a
V	sûnc-e	sûnc-a
L	sûnc-u	sûnc-ima
I	sûnc-em	sûnc-ima

Pattern 8 – Nouns with inserted t
Case	Singular	Plural
N	úže/ȕže	užèt-a
G	ȕžet-a	užét-ā
D	ȕžet-u	užèt-ima
A	úže	užèt-a
V	úže	užèt-a
L	ȕžet-u	užèt-ima
I	ȕžet-om	užèt-ima

Pattern 9 – Nouns derived from other nouns, ending in -ce
Case	Singular		Plural
N	zvónc-e	zvónce	zvónc-a
G	zvónc-a	zvóncet-a	zvȍn-ā-c-ā/zvônc-ā
D	zvónc-u	zvóncet-u	zvónc-ima
A	zvónc-e	zvónce	zvónc-a
V	zvónc-e	zvónce	zvónc-a
L	zvónc-u	zvóncet-u	zvónc-ima
I	zvónc-em	zvóncet-om	zvónc-ima

Pattern 10 – Nouns ending with -me, with inserted -n-
Case	Singular	Plural
N	rȁme	ramèn-a
G	rȁmen-a	ramén-ā
D	rȁmen-u	ramèn-ima
A	rȁme	ramèn-a
V	rȁme	ramèn-a
L	rȁmen-u	ramèn-ima
I	rȁmen-om	ramèn-ima

Pattern 11 – Nouns ending with -pódne
Case	Singular	Plural
N	pódne	pódnev-a
G	pódnev-a	pódnēv-ā
D	pódnev-u	pódnev-ima
A	pódne	pódnev-a
V	pódne	pódnev-a
L	pódnev-u	pódnev-ima
I	pódnev-om	pódnev-ima

===== Other neuter nouns =====
The pluralia tantum nouns vráta, ústa and plúća can have the suffix -ijū in genitive plural: vrátijū, ústijū, plúćijū. The only neuter noun ending in -a is dȍba/dôba:

Case	Singular	Plural
N	dȍba	dȍba
G	dȍba	dôbā
D	dȍbu	dȍbima
A	dȍba	dȍba
V	dȍba	dȍba
L	dȍbu	dȍbima
I	dȍbom	dȍbima

==== e-type nouns ====
This type reflects Proto-Slavic a-stems, and is characterized by the ending -a in nominative singular and -ē in genitive singular. It contains most of the feminine nouns, and a small number of masculines.

	singular	plural
Nominative	-a	-e
Genitive	-e	-a
Dative/Locative	-i	-ama
Accusative	-u	-e
Vocative	-o/a	-e
Instrumental	-om	-ama

==== i-type nouns ====
This type reflects Proto-Slavic i-stems, and is characterized by the zero ending in nominative singular and -i in genitive singular. It contains the rest of feminine nouns, i.e., those that are not contained in the e-type nouns (a-stems).

	singular	plural
Nominative	-	-i
Genitive	-i	-i
Dative/Locative	-i	-ima
Accusative	-	-i
Vocative	-i	-i
Instrumental	-i/ju	-ima

Some nouns appear only in the plural form and do not have a singular variant (see plurale tantum). The gender of these nouns is either feminine (e.g. hlače 'trousers', gaće 'pants', grudi 'chest') or neuter (e.g. kola 'car', leđa 'back', usta 'mouth').

== Pronouns ==
Serbo-Croatian allows deletion of the subject pronoun, because the inflected verb already contains information about its subject (see pro-drop language). Example:

Bojim se. 'I am afraid.'
Bojiš se. You are afraid.
Možeš reći što god hoćeš. 'You can say whatever you want.'

(Note: The words in the brackets represent shorter, unstressed versions of the pronouns that are often used instead of longer, stressed versions. Those unstressed versions, however, only occur in genitive, accusative and dative.)

Case	1st sg.	2nd sg.	3rd sg. (m/f/n)	1st pl.	2nd pl.	3rd pl.
Nominative	ja	ti	on / ona / ono	mi	vi	oni / one / ona
Genitive	mene (me)	tebe (te)	njega (ga) / nje (je) / njega (ga)	nas	vas	njih (ih)
Dative	meni (mi)	tebi (ti)	njemu (mu) / njoj (joj) / njemu (mu)	nama (nam)	vama (vam)	njima (im)
Accusative	mene (me)	tebe (te)	njega (ga) / nju (ju) / njega (ga)	nas	vas	njih (ih)
Vocative	–	ti	–	–	vi	–
Locative	meni	tebi	njemu / njoj / njemu	nama	vama	njima
Instrumental	mnom	tobom	njim / njom / njim	nama	vama	njima

== Adjectives ==
Some of the declensions for adjectives are the same as for nouns: velika kuća (sing. fem. nom.), veliku kuću (sing. fem. acc.). Others differ: velikog stana (sing. masc. gen.), jednim klikom 'with one click' (sing. masc. instrum.).

Case	singular					plural		
Case	masculine indefinite	masculine definite	feminine	neuter indefinite	neuter definite	masculine	feminine	neuter
Nominative	Ø	-i	-a	-o	-o	-i	-e	-a
Genitive	-a	-og/-oga	-e	-a	-og	-ih	-ih	-ih
Dative	-u	-om/-omu/ome	-oj	-u	-om/-omu/ome	-im/-ima	-im/-ima	-im/-ima
Accusative	Ø/-a*	-i/-og/-oga*	-u	-o	-o	-e	-e	-a
Vocative	Ø	-i	-a	-o	-o	-i	-e	-a
Locative	-u	-om/-omu/-ome	-oj	-u	-om/-omu/-ome	-im/-ima	-im/-ima	-im/-ima
Instrumental	-im	-im	-om	-im	-im	-im/-ima	-im/-ima	-im/-ima

* same as nominative if a word is marking inanimate object; same as genitive if a word is marking animate object.

Case	singular					plural		
Case	masculine indefinite	masculine definite	feminine	neuter indefinite	neuter definite	masculine	feminine	neuter
Nominative	velik	veliki	velika	veliko	veliko	veliki	velike	velika
Genitive	velika	velikog, velikoga	velike	velika	velikog, velikoga	velikih	velikih	velikih
Dative	veliku	velikom, velikomu, velikome	velikoj	veliku	velikom, velikomu, velikome	velikim, velikima	velikim, velikima	velikim, velikima
Accusative	velik	veliki	veliku	veliko	veliki	velike	velike	velika
Vocative	velik	veliki	velika	veliko	veliko	veliki	velike	velika
Locative	veliku	velikom, velikomu, velikome	velikoj	veliku	velikom, velikomu, velikome	velikim, velikima	velikim, velikima	velikim, velikima
Instrumental	velikim	velikim	velikom	velikim	velikim	velikim, velikima	velikim, velikima	velikim, velikima

- Note: animate objects (people and animals) are treated differently in the singular masculine accusative. In this case, it is the same as singular masculine genitive. It is considered accusative even though it looks like the genitive. Example: Vidim velikog psa 'I see the big dog'.
- Note: most adjectives ending in consonant-'a'-consonant (for example: dobar 'good'), the 'a' disappears when any sound is added. Dobar becomes, for example, dobri, dobra, dobrog, dobru, dobrim, dobrom, dobre, and dobrih, according to case and number.

== Numerals ==
Nouns modified by numerals are in the genitive case. As a vestige of the dual number, 2, 3, and 4 take the genitive singular, and 5 and above take the genitive plural.

- jedan pas (one dog)
- tri psa (three dogs)
- pet pasa (five dogs)

Digit	Serbo-Croatian	English	Digits	Serbo-Croatian	English	Digits	Serbo-Croatian	English	Digits	Serbo-Croatian (1)	Serbo-Croatian (2)	English
0	nula	zero	10	deset	ten	20	dvadeset (two <times> ten)	twenty	200	dv(j)esta / dv(j)esto	dvije stotine / dve stotine	two hundred
1	jèdan	one	11	jedanaest	eleven	30	trideset	thirty	300	tristo	tri stotine	three hundred
2	dvȃ	two	12	dvanaest	twelve	40	četrdeset	forty	400	četiristo	četiri stotine	four hundred
3	trȋ	three	13	trinaest	thirteen	50	pedeset	fifty	500	petsto	pet stotina	five hundred
4	čètiri	four	14	četrnaest	fourteen	60	šezdeset	sixty	600	šeststo	šest stotina	six hundred
5	pȇt	five	15	petnaest (same pattern as above)	fifteen	70	sedamdeset	seventy	700	sedamsto	sedam stotina	seven hundred
6	šȇst	six	16	šesnaest (same pattern as above)	sixteen	80	osamdeset	eighty	800	osamsto	osam stotina	eight hundred
7	sȅdam	seven	17	sedamnaest (same pattern as above)	seventeen	90	devedeset	ninety	900	devetsto	devet stotina	nine hundred
8	ȍsam	eight	18	osamnaest (same pattern as above)	eighteen	100	sto	hundred	1000	tisuća / hiljada	—	thousand
9	dȅvet	nine	19	devetnaest (same pattern as above)	nineteen							

== Verbs ==
Like those of other Slavic languages, Serbo-Croatian verbs have a property of aspect: the perfective and the imperfective. Perfective indicates an action that is completed or sudden, while the imperfective denotes continuous, repeated, or habitual action. Aspect compensates for a relative lack of tenses compared with e.g. Germanic or Romance languages: the verb already contains the information whether the action is completed or lasting, so there is no general distinction between continuous and perfect tenses.

Slavic verbs in general are characterized by a relatively low number of stems, from which a wide variety of meanings is achieved by prefixation.

=== Tense ===
The indicative has seven tenses: present, past, futures I and II, pluperfect, aorist and imperfect. The last two are not used often in daily speech (more often in Bosnia and Herzegovina than in Croatia and Serbia), especially the imperfect. The imperfect is considered archaic in speech and appears only in certain expressions like "Kako se zvaše" ("What was it called"). The aorist is often used to indicate that something has just now happened, for example "Ispadoše mi ključevi" ("My keys fell down"). Its frequency depends on the speaker and the region. Southern Serbian and Montenegrin regions use it quite often whereas people in Belgrade use it only sometimes. Some regions may also use it referring to a remote event. The aorist form of the verb "otići" ("to go away") is often used to refer to an immediate future, for example "Odoh na spavanje" ("I'm going to sleep"). Like the present, the aorist and imperfect are formed through inflection, and the other tenses are periphrastic:

- Past uses the present of biti 'to be' plus the perfect participle, e.g., radio sam (or sam radio, order depending on the sentence).
- Future I uses the (reduced) present of htjeti 'will' or 'to want' plus the infinitive, e.g., ćemo kuhati (or kuhat ćemo, in which case the -i of the infinitive marker -ti is elided).
- Future II uses the perfective future of biti (the only verb with a simple future) plus the perfect participle, e.g. budu išli.
- Pluperfect, which is not often used, uses the composite past tense of biti plus the perfect participle, e.g. bio sam došao, or (archaic) imperfect of biti plus the participle, e.g. bijah došao

Future tense can also be formed with (reduced) present of hteti plus the conjunction da and the present of the main verb, e.g. ćeš da kuvaš in Serbian, but this form is incorrect in Croatian. Also, whereas in Croatian it would be radit ćemo, in Serbian the t can be omitted and the verbs merged into radićemo.

Aorist forms

The aorist form depends on the verb's infinitive root (the form without -ti, may be different from the present root). Case where the root ends in a vowel:

inf. pomisliti (to think of something), root pomisli-
Person	Singular	Plural
1st	pomisli-h	pomisli-smo
2nd	pomisli-Ø	pomisli-ste
3rd	pomisli-Ø	pomisli-še

The infinitive root may not be obvious from the infinitive if it ends in a consonant, because the root ending interacted with the t of -ti during the language's development. These were the sound changes:

Starting combination	Result
z+t	st
t+t	st
d+t	st
k+t	ć
g+t	ć

This is the source of infinitives with -ći instead of -ti (except ići). Roots of these kinds should then technically be known by heart, but they happen to be equal to the present root forms. An alternate aorist form is used with these verbs: an -o- is infixed in some cases, and -e is used in 2nd/3rd sg.

inf. pasti (to fall), root pad-
Person	Singular	Plural
1st	pad-o-h	pad-o-smo
2nd	pad-e	pad-o-ste
3rd	pad-e	pad-o-še

Before the front vowel e, the velars k and g regularly turn into č and ž respectively.

inf. stići (to catch up with), root stig-
Person	Singular	Plural
1st	stig-o-h	stig-o-smo
2nd	stiž-e	stig-o-ste
3rd	stiž-e	stig-o-še

A verb with an irregular inf. root ending in a consonant. Correspondingly, the 2nd aorist form described is used:

inf. dati (to give), root dad-
Person	Singular	Plural
1st	dad-o-h	dad-o-smo
2nd	dad-e	dad-o-ste
3rd	dad-e	dad-o-še

The use of this apparently extraneous (when compared to the infinitive) d has spread to other verbs, most notably verbs on -stati and znati.

Exemplary postati (to become):

regular root posta-
Person	Singular	Plural
1st	posta-h	posta-smo
2nd	posta-Ø	posta-ste
3rd	posta-Ø	posta-še

irregular root posta-d-
Person	Singular	Plural
1st	posta-d-o-h	posta-d-o-smo
2nd	posta-d-e	posta-d-o-ste
3rd	posta-d-e	posta-d-o-še

Uses of the aorist

It is used only with verbs of the perfective aspect

1: For actions that have just now happened, right before you talk about it (often with an emotional nuance):

Examples:

"Ujede me komarac" ("A mosquito bit me")

"Ode mi autobus" ("I missed the bus/The bus went away")

"Baš sad htedoh da te nazovem" ("I just wanted to call you")

"Uništiše mi ovi moljci košulju" ("These moths destroyed my shirt")

"Pomislih na tebe" ("I have just thought about you")

2: One time actions that happened at some point in the past. This meaning of the aorist appears often in storytelling

"Bio sam u kući, kad neki ljudi zakucaše na vrata. Ustadoh da vidim ko je" ("I was at home when someone knocked at the door. I got up to see who it is")

3: Actions that are just about to happen. Limited to certain verbs

"Odoh sad u školu" ("I'm going to school now")

"Pomresmo od gladi" ("We are starving")

=== Mood ===
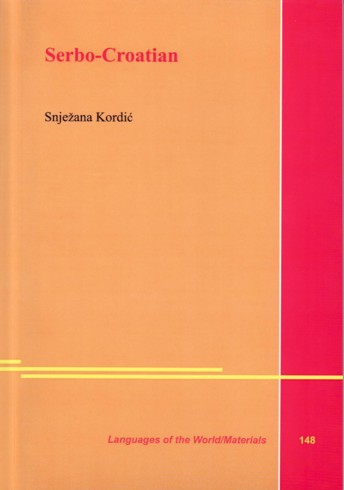
Book cover of Snježana Kordić's grammar book Serbo-Croatian 1st pub. 1997, 2nd pub. 2006 (Contents)

Besides the indicative, Serbo-Croatian uses the imperative, conditional, and optative. Imperative forms vary according to the type of the verb, and are formed by adding the appropriate morpheme to a verbal stem. The conditional I (present) uses the aorist of biti plus perfect participle, while conditional II (past) consists of the perfect participle of biti, the aorist of the same verb, and the perfect participle of the main verb. Some grammars classify future II as a conditional tense, or even a mood of its own.

Optative is in its form identical to the perfect participle. It is used by speakers to express a strong wish, e.g. Živio predsjednik! 'Long live the president!', Dabogda ti se sjeme zatrlo! 'May God let your seed destroyed' (an archaic and dialectal curse), etc. The optative may be translated into English by an imperative construction, with set phrases (such as the already exemplified 'long live'), or by use of the modal verb may.

Some authors suggest the existence of subjunctive mood, realized as da plus the present of indicative, but most grammars treat it as present indicative.

=== Aspect ===
Verbal aspect is distinguished in English by using the simple or progressive (continuous) forms. 'He washed the dishes' indicates that the action was finished; 'He was washing the dishes' indicates that the action was ongoing (progressive). Serbo-Croatian, like all Slavic languages, has the aspect built into the verbs, rather than expressing it with different tenses.

To compare the meanings of the different aspects with verbal aspect in English, one should know three basic aspects: completed (may be called preterite, aorist, or perfect according to the language in question), progressive (on-going but not completed yet, durative), and iterative (habitual or repeated). English uses one aspect for completed and iterative and another for progressive. Serbo-Croatian uses one for completed and another for iterative and progressive.

Aspect is the most challenging part of Serbo-Croatian grammar. Although aspect exists in all other Slavic languages, learners of Serbo-Croatian who already know even one of several other Slavic languages may never learn to use aspect correctly, though they will be understood with only rare problems. While there are bi-aspectual verbs as well, primarily those derived by adding the suffix -irati or -ovati, the majority of verbs not derived in such a manner are either perfective (svršeni) or imperfective (nesvršeni). Almost all of the single aspectual verbs are part of a perfective–imperfective pair of verbs. When learning a verb, one must learn its verbal aspect, and the other verb for the opposite verbal aspect, e.g. prati 'to do washing' (imperfective) goes with oprati 'to wash' (perfective). The pairing, however, is not always one to one: some verbs simply don't have a counterpart on a semantic level, such as izgledati 'seem' or sadržati 'contain'. In others, there are several perfective alternatives with slightly different meanings.

There are two paradigms concerning formation of verb pairs. In one paradigm, the base verb is imperfective, such as prati 'to wash'. In this case the perfective is formed by adding a prefix, in this case o, as in oprati. In the other paradigm, the root verb is perfective, and the imperfective is formed either by modifying the root: dignuti→dizati 'to lift', or adding an interfix: stati→stajati 'to stop', 'to stand'.

A pattern which often arises can be illustrated with pisati 'to write'. Pisati is imperfective, so a prefix is needed to make it perfective, in this case na-: napisati. But if other prefixes are added, modifying the meaning, the verb becomes perfective: zapisati 'to write down' or prepisati 'to copy by hand'. Since these basic verbs are perfective, an interfix is needed to make them imperfective: zapisivati and prepisivati. In some cases, this could be continued by adding a prefix: pozapisivati and isprepisivati which are again perfective.

=== Conjugation ===
There are three conjugations of verbs:

1. 'a': almost all verbs that have this conjugation end in '-ati'.
2. 'e': verbs ending in '-nuti' and all irregular verbs (as in the example below). Verbs ending in '-ovati', '-ivati' become 'uje' when conjugated (trovati 'to poison' is trujem, truje etc.)
3. 'i': almost all verbs ending in '-jeti' or '-iti' use this conjugation.

Person	čitati		prati (irregular)		vidjeti (-jeti or -iti)	
Person	singular	plural	singular	plural	singular	plural
First person	čitam	čitamo	perem	peremo	vidim	vidimo
Second person	čitaš	čitate	pereš	perete	vidiš	vidite
Third person	čita	čitaju	pere	peru	vidi	vide

==== Auxiliary verbs ====
As in most other Indo-European languages including English, the Indo-European copula ('to be') is used as an auxiliary verb. It is universally irregular, because conjugations of two proto-forms *h1es- (>English is) and *bʰuH- (>English be) merged, producing mixed paradigms: the former being used in the present, and the latter in the other tenses. In Serbo-Croatian, however, there are two present forms surviving: jesam ('I am') and budem ('I be'). Because of that dualism, some grammars (chiefly Serbian ones) treat jesam as a defective verb having only present tense. Others treat these forms as two realizations of the same irregular verb biti, jesam being imperfective and budem perfective.

Jesam has the following conjugation in the present tense. It has long and clitic (short) forms (without leading je), while its negative form is written as one word, unlike other verbs (compare English is–isn't). The short and the negative forms are used as auxiliary, while the long form is marked.

Pronoun	Present		Present (negative forms)
Pronoun	Long (stressed) form	Short (unstressed) form	Present (negative forms)
ja (I)	jesam	sam	nisam
ti (you)	jesi	si	nisi
on, ona, ono (he, she, it)	jest(e)	je	nije
mi (we)	jesmo	smo	nismo
vi (you pl.)	jeste	ste	niste
oni, one, ona (they)	jesu	su	nisu

The copulative use of the verb јеsam matches that of the verb 'to be' in English (e.g. He is a student – On је učenik), of course, in the present tense only. The 'true' forms present of the verb biti, (budem) have a limited use (in formation of the future exact tense, or in conditional clauses referring to the future, e.g. ako budem – if I am).

Verb biti is conjugated as follows:

Pronoun	Present	Future		Past tense			
Pronoun	Present	1st	2nd	perfect	aorist	imperfect	pluperfect
ja (I)	budem	ću biti / biću / bit ću	budem bio/bila	sam bio/bila; bio/bila sam	bih	bijah / bejah / beh	bio/bila sam bio/bila
ti (you)	budeš	ćeš biti / bićeš / bit ćeš	budeš bio/bila	si bio/bila; bio/bila si	bi	bijaše / bejaše / beše	bio/bila si bio/bila
on, ona, ono (he, she, it)	bude	će biti / biće / bit će	bude bio/bila/bilo	je bio/bila/bilo; bio/bila/bilo je	bi	bijaše / bejaše / beše	bio/bila/bilo je bio/bila/bilo
mi (we)	budemo	ćemo biti / bićemo / bit ćemo	budemo bili/bile	smo bili/bile; bili/bile smo	bismo	bijasmo / bejasmo / besmo	bili/bile smo bili/bile
vi (you pl.)	budete	ćete biti / bićete / bit ćete	budete bili/bile	ste bili/bile; bili/bile ste	biste / beste	biјaste / bejaste / beste	bili/bile ste bili/bile
oni, one, ona (they)	budu	će biti / biće / bit će	budu bili/bile	su bili/bile/bila; bili/bile/bila su	bi / biše	biјahu / bejahu / behu	bili/bile/bila su bili/bile/bila

==== Regular verbs ====
The conjugation system of regular verbs is rather complex. There are several classes of verbs distinguished according to certain features verbs within a class share.
The verb is raditi (To work)

Pronoun	Present	Future		Past tense			
Pronoun	Present	1st	2nd	perfect	aorist	imperfect	pluperfect
ja (I)	radim	ću raditi	budem radio/la	sam radio/la; radio/la sam	radih	rad+jah>rađah	bio/la sam radio/la
ti (you)	radiš	ćeš raditi	budeš radio/la	si radio/la; radio/la si	radi	rad+jaše>rađaše	bio/la si radio/la
on, ona, ono (he, she, it)	radi	će raditi	bude radio/la/lo	je radio/la/lo; radio/la/lo je	radi	rad+jaše>rađaše	bio/la/lo je radio/la/lo
mi (we)	radimo	ćemo raditi	budemo radili/le	smo radili/le; radili/le smo	radismo	rad+jasmo>rađasmo	bili/le smo radili/le
vi (you pl.)	radite	ćete raditi	budete radili/le	ste radili/le; radili/le ste	radiste	rad+jaste>rađaste	bili/le ste radili/le
oni, one, ona (they)	rade	će raditi	budu radili/le/la	su radili/radile/radila; radili/le/la su	radiše	rad+jahu>rađahu	bili/le/la su radili/le/la

Pronoun	Present	Future		Past tense			
Pronoun	Present	1st	2nd	perfect	aorist	imperfect	pluperfect
ja (I)	vidim	ću videti	budem video/la	video/la sam	videh	viđah	bio/la sam video/la
ti (you)	vidiš	ćeš videti	budeš video/la	video/la si	vide	viđaše	bio/la si video/la
on, ona, ono (he, she, it)	vidi	će videti	bude video/la/lo	video/la/lo je	vide	viđaše	bio/la/lo je video/la/lo
mi (we)	vidimo	ćemo videti	budemo videli/le	videli/le smo	videsmo	viđasmo	bili/le smo videli/le
vi (you pl.)	vidite	ćete videti	budete videli/le	videli/le ste	videste	viđaste	bili/le ste videli/le
oni, one, ona (they)	vide	će videti	budu videli/le/la	videli/le/la su	videše	viđahu	bili/le/la su videli/le/la

Pronoun	Present	Future		Past tense			
Pronoun	Present	1st	2nd	perfect	aorist	imperfect	pluperfect
ja (I)	reknem	ću reći	budem rekao/la	rekao/la sam	rekoh	/	bio/la sam rekao/la
ti (you)	rekneš	ćeš reći	budeš rekao/la	rekao/la si	reče	/	bio/la si rekao/la
on, ona, ono (he, she, it)	rekne	će reći	bude rekao/la/lo	rekao/la/lo je	reče	/	bio/la/lo je rekao/la/lo
mi (we)	reknemo	ćemo reći	budemo rekli/le	rekli/le smo	rekosmo	/	bili/le smo rekli/le
vi (you pl.)	reknete	ćete reći	budete rekli/le	rekli/le ste	rekoste	/	bili/le ste rekli/le
oni, one, ona (they)	reknu	će reći	budu rekli/le/la	rekli/le/la su	rekoše	/	bili/le/la su rekli/le/la

The present tense of "reći" is rare. It's replaced by the present tense of the verb "kazati". "Reći" is a verb of the perfective aspect and hence it doesn't have the imperfect tense.

==== Irregular verbs ====
Irregular verbs are more complex to conjugate than regular verbs, for example the verb moći (can, to be able to)

Pronoun	Present	Future		Past tense			
Pronoun	Present	1st	2nd	perfect	aorist	imperfect	pluperfect
ja (I)	mogu	ću moći	budem mogao/la	sam mogao/la; mogao/la sam	mogoh	mogah	bio/la sam mogao/la
ti (you)	možeš	ćeš moći	budeš mogao/la	si mogao/la; mogao/la si	može	mogaše	bio/la si mogao/la
on, ona, ono (he, she, it)	može	će moći	bude mogao/la/lo	je mogao/la/lo; mogao/la/lo je	može	mogaše	bio/la/lo je mogao/la/lo
mi (we)	možemo	ćemo moći	budemo mogli/le	smo mogli/le; mogli/le smo	mogosmo	mogasmo	bili/le smo mogli/le
vi (you pl.)	možete	ćete moći	budete mogli/le	ste mogli/le; mogli/le ste	mogoste	mogaste	bili/le ste mogli/le
oni, one, ona (they)	mogu	će moći	budu mogli/le/la	su mogli/mogle/mogla; mogli/le/la su	mogoše	mogahu	bili/le/la su mogli/le/la

== Adverbs ==
Adverbs in Serbo-Croatian are, unlike nouns, verbs, adjectives, pronouns and numbers, and like prepositions, conjunctions, exclamations and particles, immutable words. Adverbs are, thus, immutable words given to verbs to determine the time, place, manner, cause, point and the amount of the action of the verb. There are seven types of adverbs in Serbo-Croatian:

=== Place adverbs ===
Place adverbs (Serbo-Croatian: mjesni prilozi) answer the questions where? (gdje?), to where? (kamo?), which way? (kuda?), from where? (otkuda?, odakle?) and to where? (dokle?, dokud?). Examples for each type are:

gde/gdje? (where)

ovde/ovdje (here),
negde/negdje (somewhere),
nigde/nigdje (nowhere),
igde/igdje (anywhere),
gore (up),
dole/dolje (down),
odpozadi/straga (from behind),
napolju/vani (outside)
blizu (close by);

kuda/kamo? (to where)

ovamo (to here)
napred/naprijed (forwards)
nazad (backwards);

kuda? (which way)

ovuda (this way),
kojekuda (otišli su kojekuda – they dispersed),

otkuda? (from where)

odavde (from here),
niotkuda (from nowhere),
izdaleka (from far away)

dokle? (to where):

dotle (to here, also used as 'in the mean time', dotle su oni čekali),
donekle (up to a point).

==== Temporal adverbs ====
Temporal adverbs, or vremenski prilozi, answer the questions when? (kada?), from when? (otkad?), until when? (dokad?). Examples are: kada (when) – sada (now), tada (then), nikada (never), ponekad (sometimes), uvijek (always), jučer (yesterday), danas (today), sutra (tomorrow), prekosutra (the day after tomorrow), lani (last year), večeras (tonight), odmah/smjesta (now/at once), zatim (then), uskoro (soon), napokon (at last); otkad (from when) – odsad (from now on), oduvijek (from always – oduvijek sam te volio – I have (from) always loved you); dokad (until when) – dosad (until now), dogodine (next year).

== Prepositions ==
Each preposition has an assigned case. If an inflectable word follows a preposition, the word is declined in the same case as the preposition's assigned case.

Genitive prepositions:

od, do, iz, s(a), ispred, iza, izvan, van, unutar, iznad, ispod, više, poviše, niže, prije, uoči, poslije, nakon, za, tijekom, tokom, dno (podno, nadno, odno), vrh (povrh, navrh, uvrh, zavrh), čelo, nakraj, onkraj, krajem, potkraj, sred (nasred, posred, usred), oko, okolo, blizu, kod, kraj, pokraj, pored, nadomak, nadohvat, i, u, mimo, duž, uzduž, širom, diljem, preko, bez, osim, mjesto (umjesto, namjesto), uime, putem, (s) pomoću, posredstvom, između, (na)spram, put, protiv, nasuprot, usuprot, usprkos, unatoč, zbog, uslijed, radi (zaradi, poradi), glede, prigodom, prilikom, povodom

Dative prepositions:

k(a), prema, naprama, nadomak, nadohvat, nasuprot, usuprot, usprkos, unatoč, protiv

Accusative prepositions:

kroz, niz, uz, na, o, po, u, mimo, među, nad, pod, pred, za

Locative prepositions:

na, o, po, prema, pri, u

Instrumental prepositions:

s(a), pred, za, nad(a), pod(a), među

Dynamic v. Static

Some prepositions fall in two or more cases. The ones that fall in both the accusative and locative cases, the preposition is accusative if it is dynamic and is locative if it is static. Dynamic means that the preposition shows motion while static does not.

Examples:

Ja idem u školu. I am going to school. (dynamic)
Ja sam u školi. I am in school. (static)

== Syntax ==
=== Word order ===
Serbo-Croatian has a rich case structure that is reflected in the declension of nouns and adjectives. That allows for a great deal of freedom in word order. In English, for example, the word order shows a difference in meaning between "Man bites dog" and "Dog bites man". In Serbo-Croatian, Čovjek grize psa and Čovjeka grize pas have the same word order, but the meanings are shown by the noun endings. Any order of the three constituents is grammatically correct, and the meaning is clear because of the declensions. However, the usual order is subject–verb–object, as in English.

Serbo-Croatian closely observes Wackernagel's Law that clitics (unstressed functional words) are placed in the second position in all clauses. The first element may be a single word or a noun phrase: Taj je čovjek rekao 'That man (has) said', or Taj čovjek je rekao. Multiple clitics are grouped in the following fixed order:

1. question word (only li),
2. verbs: clitic forms of 'to be' except je (sam, si, smo, ste, su, bih, bi, bismo, biste), and of 'will' (ću, ćeš, će, ćemo, and ćete)
3. dative pronouns (mi, ti, mu, joj, nam, vam, im, si),
4. accusative pronouns (me, te, ga, je, ju, nas, vas, ih),
5. the reflexive accusative pronoun (only se),
6. clitic form of the third-person singular present of 'to be' (je).

=== Relative clauses ===
Relative clauses are frequent in modern Serbo-Croatian since they have expanded as attributes at the expense of the participles performing that function.

Znam pacijenta koji je upravo ušao.
know:PRS.1SG patient:ACC.MSG which:NOM.MSG be:AUX.3SG just come_in:AP.MSG
'I know the patient who has just come in.'

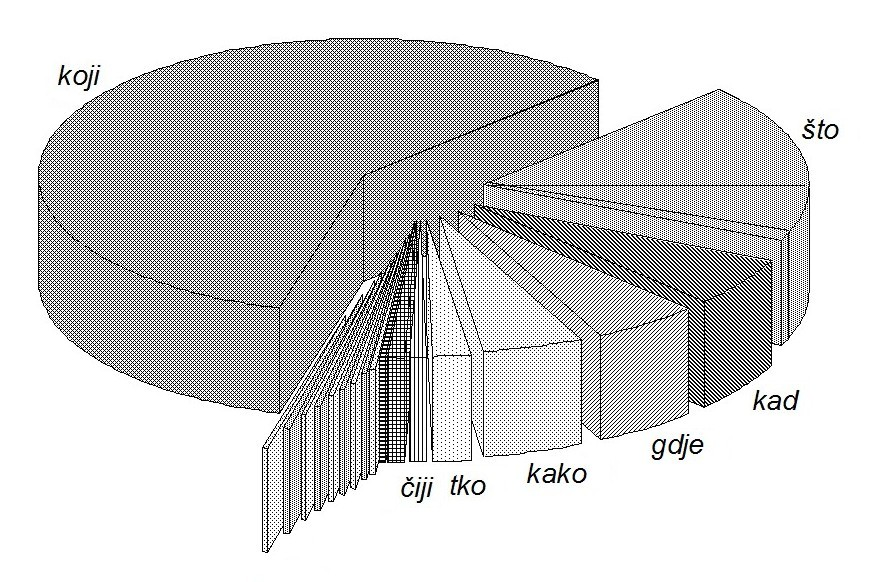
Frequency of relativizers

The most frequent relativizer is the relative pronoun koji. It has the greatest range of antecedents, which, however, are mostly nouns or personal pronouns. Nouns are the word class with attributes, and the relative clause is most frequently an attributive clause. The frequency of the adjectival pronoun koji is greater than those relative pronouns that cannot have an antecedent noun (tko ʻwhoʼ and the declinable type of što 'what'). Also, it occurs much more frequently than other adjectival relative pronouns: in comparison with their specialized semantic functions such as possessiveness (čiji 'whose'), quality (kakav 'what sort of') or quantity (koliki 'how large'), the pronoun koji has the broadest scope of reference and identification with the referent.

== See also ==
- Ausbausprache
- Differences between Serbo-Croatian standard varieties
- Language secessionism in Serbo-Croatian
- Mutual intelligibility
- Pluricentric Serbo-Croatian language
- Serbo-Croatian language
- Serbo-Croatian phonology
- Serbo-Croatian kinship
- Serbo-Croatian relative clauses
- Shtokavian dialect
- South Slavic dialect continuum
- Standard language
