= Système universitaire de documentation =

University documentation in France

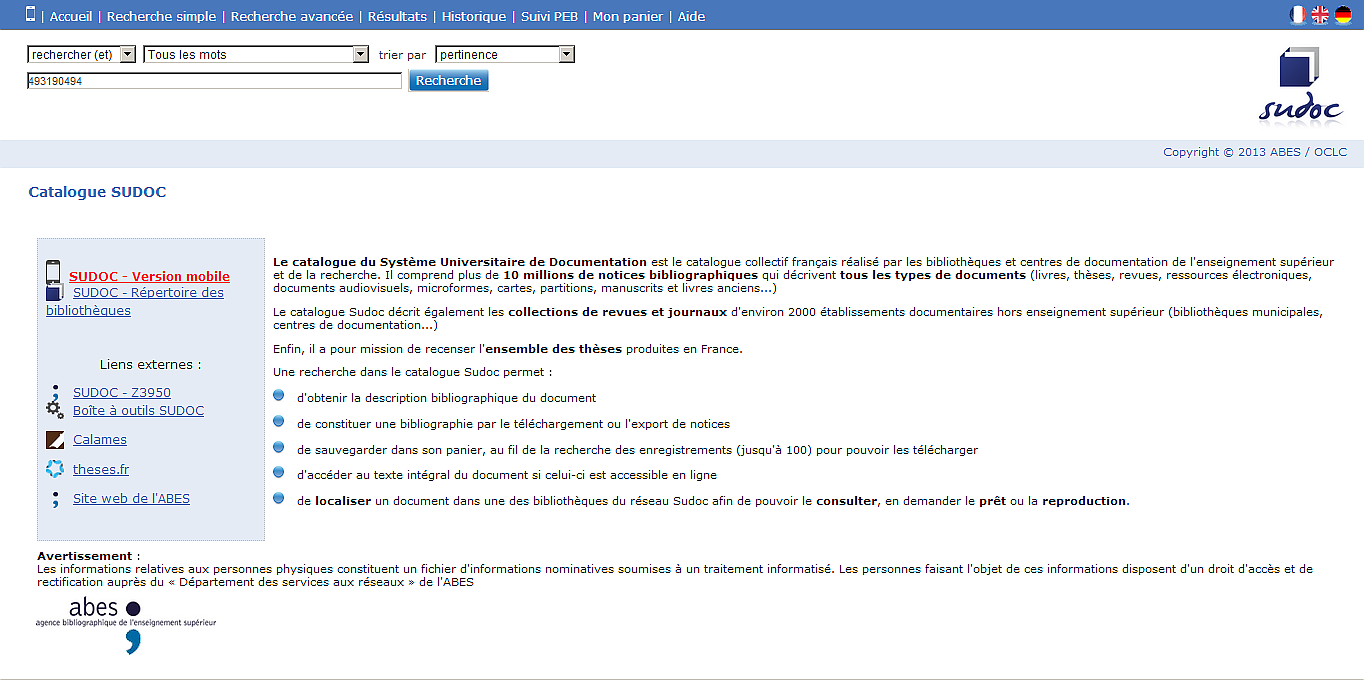
Screenshot from the Système Universitaire de Documentation (SUDOC)

The système universitaire de documentation or SUDOC is a bibliographic knowledge base used by the libraries of French universities and higher education institutions. As of 2026, the catalogue contains nearly 15 million bibliographic records describing a wide range of physical and electronic documents. It also catalogues collections of periodicals held by non-higher education libraries and resource centres in France. Students and researchers can access SUDOC over the Internet or by visiting libraries and search for bibilographical and location information.

SUDOC is maintained by the Bibliographic Agency for Higher Education (ABES) in Montpellier, as well as the OCLC PICA. Access to the system was opened in April 2000, which was officially completed in in May 2002.

As of 2009, approximately 9 million records from SUDOC were to be added into WorldCat.

== See also ==
- List of libraries in France
