= Tragovi: Journal for Serbian and Croatian Topics =

- Discipline: Croatian studies, Serbian studies
- Language: Serbo-Croatian
- Edited by: Dejan Jović

Publication details
- History: December 2018-present
- Publisher: Serb National Council and the Archive of Serbs in Croatia (Croatia)
- Frequency: Biannually
- Open access: Yes
- License: CC-BY-NC-ND

Standard abbreviations
- ISO 4: Tragovi

Indexing
- ISSN: 2623-8926 (print); 2718-3467 (web)

Links
- Journal homepage

Tragovi: Journal for Serbian and Croatian Topics (Serbo-Croatian: Tragovi: časopis za srpske i hrvatske teme, Трагови: часопис за српске и хрватске теме; transl. Footprints: Journal for Serbian and Croatian studies) is a biannual peer-reviewed open access academic journal published by the Serb National Council and the Archive of Serbs in Croatia. The journal publishes papers from various fields of social sciences and humanities focused on Serbian, Croatian, and Yugoslav studies. The goal of initiators was to create a fundus of 350 scientific articles over the period of 20 years which will constitute an unavoidable reference point for the field of studies the journal covers.

The first initiative by the same group of authors to establish a similar journal appeared in 1993 during the Croatian War of Independence which at the time failed to materialize due to lack of support for the idea. At the presentation of the first issue of the journal at the Archives of Vojvodina in Novi Sad in late February 2019, editor-in-chief Dejan Jović explained the need for the new journal by the lack of academic articles about Serbian and Croatian topics and the need to confront amateurism and political propaganda and provide space for critique. The Journal's aim is to empower Croatian intellectual community and provide platform for new young authors to engage in calm and reasoned discussion over divisive issues which complicate Serbian and Croatian relations.

As majority of reliable scientific articles on the region are published abroad in English and other major languages, the journal is published in the Serbo-Croatian language in an effort to strengthen local ownership of scientific production. The editor-in-chief explained this approach in the initial manifesto by stating:

We appreciate that a lot - and very often well - is written about Serbs and Croats in English and other languages, but we think it is important that we do not lag behind in those topics in which we should be at the forefront. We want to be a subject, not just an object, in a big (and more or less permanent) discussion about Serbs and Croats and related topics.

Full articles are indexed and available via the Central and Eastern European Online Library as well as the Portal of scientific journals of Croatia. The journal articles are also available via the Google Scholar. In February 2019 the journal organized Croatian presentation of the new book by Branka Prpa, an event organized at the Central Library of Serbs of Croatia. In September 2019 journal's representative participated in the signing of the cooperation agreement between the Institute of Contemporary History and the Serb National Council attended by ambassador of Serbia to Croatia.

In 2021 an article on the official post-war apologies between Serbia and Croatia attracted some renewed general attention and media coverage. Graphic and cover design of the journal was provided by the Zagreb-based Parabureau design studio. In 2021 the Journal was presented at the Kliofest-8th History Festival at the National and University Library in Zagreb.

== See also ==
- Novosti (Croatia)
- Croatian Political Science Review
- Croatia–Serbia relations
