= Days of Serbian Culture =

Serbian cultural celebration

Days of Serbian Culture Dani srpske kulture (Croatian) Дани српске културе (Serbian)
- Frequency: Annually
- Location: Nationally
- Country: Croatia
- Inaugurated: 2006
- Founder: SKD Prosvjeta

The Days of Serbian Culture (Croatian: Dani srpske kulture; Serbian: Дани српске културе, romanized: Dani srpske kulture) is an annual cultural event organized by the SKD Prosvjeta. Established in 2006, the event serves as a platform for cultural exchange and cooperation between Serbian and Croatian cultural communities.

Since 2018 it has expanded beyond Zagreb to include other cities across Croatia. The program includes film screenings, theatre performances, and other artistic events.

== History ==
The first edition of the festival was held in Zagreb from 21 to 26 November 2006, featuring contemporary Serbian cultural productions in film, music, theatre, visual arts, and literature. The program included Milan Lane Gutović play Obično veče, an exhibition of interwar political posters, performances by composer Miloš Petrović, and a literary evening with writer Marko Vidojković. Despite some criticism over the event's timing near Battle of Vukovar commemorations, organizers emphasized that there was no political intent and they noted strong media interest and audience turnout. The 2007 edition of the festival included Goran Marković play Delirijum tremens, a concert of traditional Balkan vocal music by the Braća Teofilovići, a literary evening with author Svetislav Basara, and screenings of Miroslav Momčilović film Sedam i po.

The 2008 edition of the festival was held from 12 to 18 December in Zagreb. Literary events included a promotion of Vladimir Arsenijević novel Predator at the City Library of Zagreb and a reading by Vule Žurić with Miljenko Jergović and Nenad Rizvanović at the Booksa club. Theatre and film presentations included Atelje 212 staging of Ljubomir Simović play Putujuće pozorište Šepalović at the Zagreb Youth Theatre and screenings of anti-war documentaries, short films by Novi Sad authors, and student films from the Faculty of Dramatic Arts in Belgrade at Cinema Europa. 2009 program included “Nova blokada?” panel at the Croatian Journalists' Association building, with speakers including Srećko Horvat, Igor Štiks, Jerko Bakotin, Andrea Zlatar and Goran Radman, alongside student representatives from Belgrade. Literary events included the promotion of Daniel Kovač novel Uzvodni bluz.

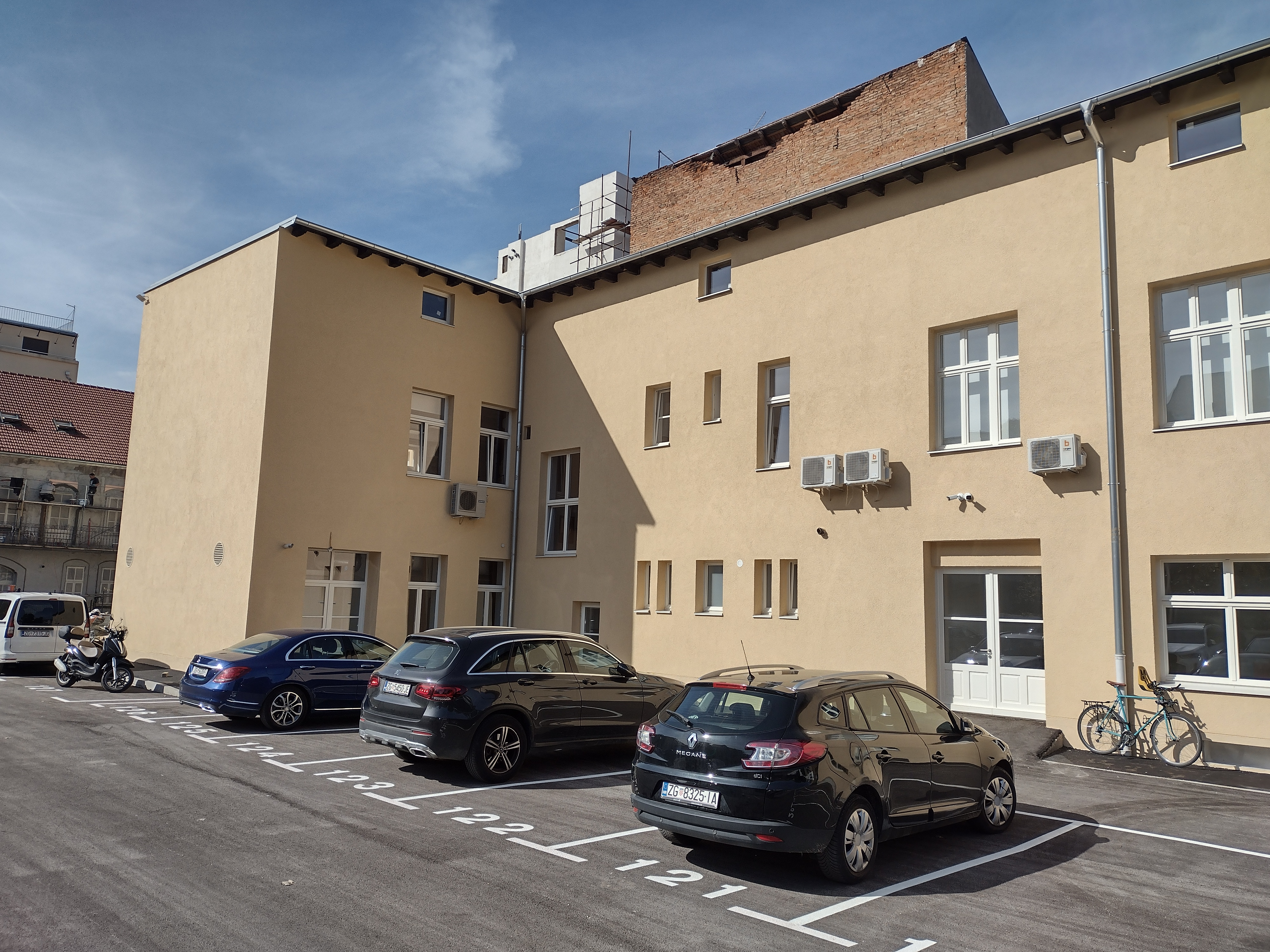
Building of the Archives of Serbs in Croatia in Zagreb, opened as a part of the 2024 Days of Serbian Culture

The 2019 edition of the festival was opened by the President of the Council for Ethnic Minorities of the Republic of Croatia Aleksandar Tolnauer. Alongside Zagreb, 2019 festival was held in Rijeka and Opatija.

The 2022 Days of Serbian Culture in Zagreb and seven other Croatian cities focused on “Zagreb–Belgrade Connections”, highlighting artists who lived or worked across both cities over the past century. The program included the exhibition Tabula rasa showcasing works by Sava Šumanović, Neša Paripović and others.

The 2024 Days of Serbian Culture in Zagreb began with the official opening of the Archives of Serbs in Croatia on a historic site returned to the Serb community. The event featured the exhibition Barbarogenij nadrealizma. It focused on the work of Dušan Kovačević. Organisers emphasised the centre's role in fostering cultural exchange between Serbs and Croats, as well as broader cooperation with European artists.

=== 2025 controversy ===
During the 2025 Days of Serbian Culture, a folk performance in Split was disrupted by around fifty masked men shouting the Ustaše salute “Za dom spremni”. Croatian officials, including President Zoran Milanović and Prime Minister Andrej Plenković, condemned the attack, while opposition Social Democratic Party of Croatia and civic organizations criticized government tolerance of right-wing extremism. The Independent Union of Science and Higher Education called for the dismissal of Interior Minister Davor Božinović, criticizing his statement that the Torcida Split football fan group did not need to notify authorities before holding a protest in Split, arguing that his position was discriminatory and undermined equality before the law. The festival continued the next day at the Alliance française building.

Shortly after the attack in Split, a smaller masked group gathered outside the Serbian Cultural Center in Zagreb during an exhibition of Dejan Medaković art collection, singing nationalist songs. Zagreb Mayor Tomislav Tomašević strongly condemned the celebration of the collaborationist Independent State of Croatia and the threatening behaviour emphasizing that Zagreb and Croatia are founded on the Constitution and the rule of law.

As part of the series of tensions following the Days of Serbian Culture events in Split and Zagreb, a right-wing protester gathered in Rijeka outside the Centar Zamet during the Balkan Karate Championship, where the Serbian national team was participating. The Croatian Ombudsperson for Children, Helenca Pirnat Dragičević, expressed concern about the rise of intolerance, hostility, and hate narratives affecting children.

Following the incidents in Split, Zagreb and Rijeka tensions continued in Vukovar over the planned opening of the photography exhibition Serbian Women related to World War I in Serbia, organized by the Serbian Cultural Center Vukovar, the Joint Council of Municipalities and the Consulate General of the Republic of Serbia in Vukovar. The exhibition was scheduled to open on 11 November 2025. Vukovar Mayor Marijan Pavliček of Croatian Sovereignists party requested that the exhibition be postponed, citing the city's annual commemoration of the 1991 Battle of Vukovar. The Joint Council of Municipalities stated that it had not received an official request to postpone the exhibition and invited the mayor to communicate through official channels. Croatian Minister of Culture and Media Nina Obuljen Koržinek supported mayor's view, calling the timing of the exhibition “inappropriate”. The Serbian Ministry of Culture condemned the postponement initiative, describing it as part of a “burden of revisionism” and claiming that expressions of Serbian culture were being systematically suppressed in Croatia. On 11 November 2025, Dejan Drakulić, President of the Joint Council of Municipalities, announced that the exhibition Srpkinja would open in December. The decision was made in coordination with the author and all participating organisations.

== See also ==
- Serbs of Croatia
- Serb National Council
