= Dejan Jović =

Croatian political scientist

PhD Dejan Jović
- Дејан Јовић
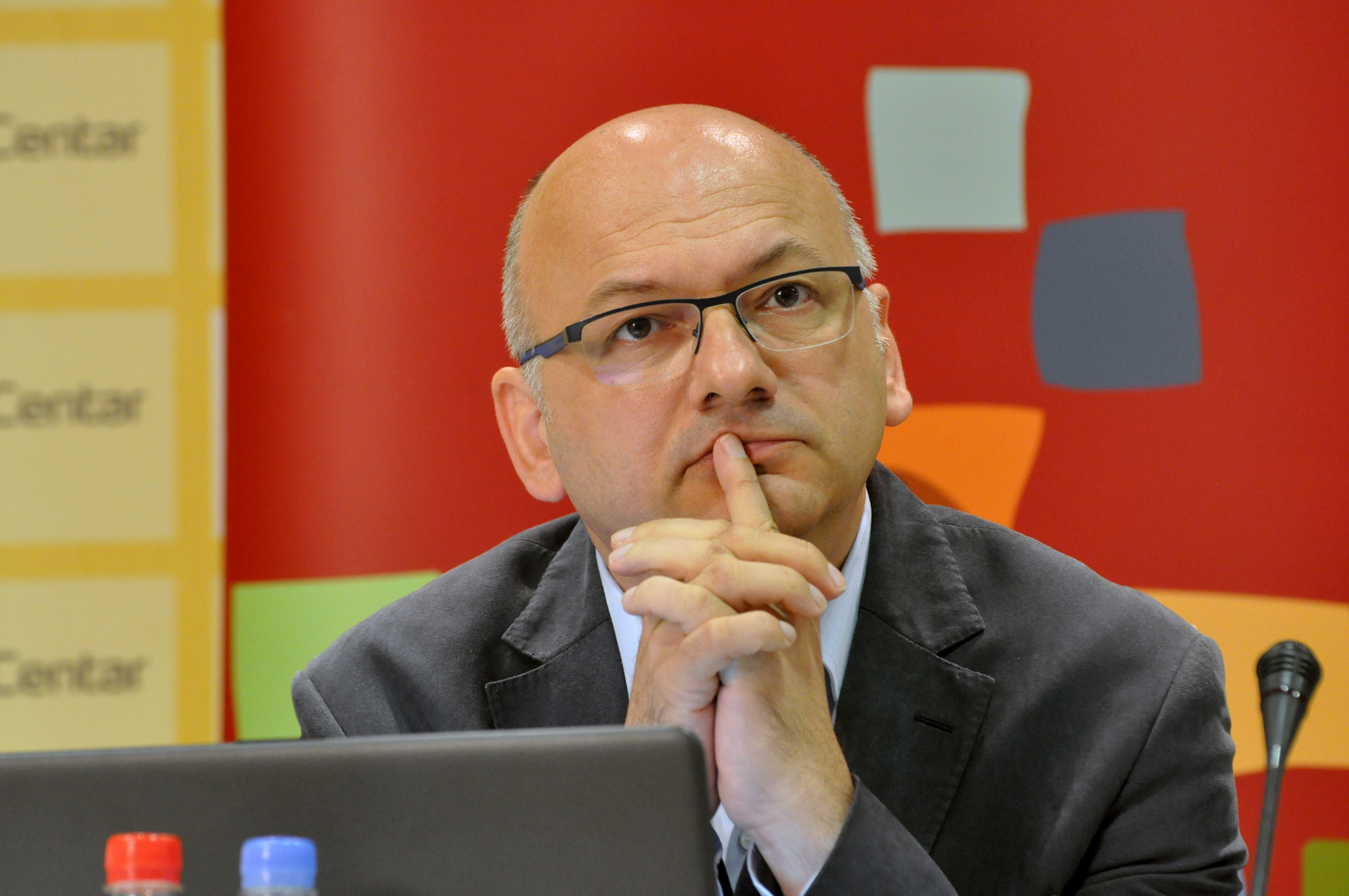
- Dejan Jović at the Media Center Belgrade in 2018
- Born: 12 April 1968 (age 58); Samobor, SR Croatia, SFR Yugoslavia
- Citizenship: Croatian

Academic background
- Education: London School of Economics and Political Science (Ph.D.) University of Manchester (M.A.); University of Ljubljana (M.A.) University of Zagreb (B.A.)
- Thesis: The Breakdown of Elite Ideological Consensus: The Prelude to the Disintegration of Yugoslavia (1974–1990) (1999)
- Doctoral advisor: Dominic Lieven

Academic work
- Discipline: political science and international relations
- Institutions: University of Stirling University of Zagreb University of Belgrade (guest lecturer)
- Main interests: Breakup of Yugoslavia, international relations theory, counter hegemonic natives and policies opposed to exclusionary Croatian and Serbian ethnic nationalism, European integration
- Notable works: Yugoslavia: A State that Withered Away

Dejan Jović (Serbian Cyrillic: Дејан Јовић; born 12 April 1968) is a political scientist from Croatia. He is a full-time professor at the Faculty of Political Science at the University of Zagreb. From 2012 to 2020, Jović was editor-in-chief of the Croatian Political Science Review, one of the leading academic journals of political science and social science in Southeast Europe. He is also one of the founders and editor-in-chief of the peer reviewed journal Tragovi: Journal for Serbian and Croatian Topics published by the Serb National Council and the Archive of Serbs in Croatia.

Dejan Jović is a specialist in Yugoslav and post-Yugoslav politics as well as foreign policies and theories of international relations. On 21 May 2021, Jović was elected as a new member of the European Academy of Sciences and Arts in the Class V: Social Sciences, Law, and Economics. In late May of the same year, Jović founded the Foreign Policy Forum in Zagreb together with Vesna Pusić, Budimir Lončar, Tvrtko Jakovina and others. The new think tank was officially registered on 4 June with Jović as the chairman of the board.

== Biography ==
=== Early life ===
Dejan Jović was born in Samobor, a town in the Zagreb County, on 12 April 1968 during the time of the Socialist Republic of Croatia. In an interview, he described himself as both Croat and Serb, acknowledging that such complex self-determination may cause shock among some members of both communities who are used to totalitarian nationalism and are unaccustomed to the liberal identity approach.

=== Education ===
Dejan Jović completed his undergraduate studies at the University of Zagreb in 1990, master level studies at the University of Ljubljana in Slovenia and, the University of Manchester in England in 1994 and Ph.D. studies at the London School of Economics and Political Science in 1999. At the LSE Jović defended his doctoral thesis under the title The Breakdown of Elite Ideological Consensus: The Prelude to the Disintegration of Yugoslavia (1974–1990) under the primary supervision of Chris Binns and with the support of the Overseas Research Support Grant, the LSE Graduate Scholarship, and the Open Society Fund Grant.

== Academic career ==
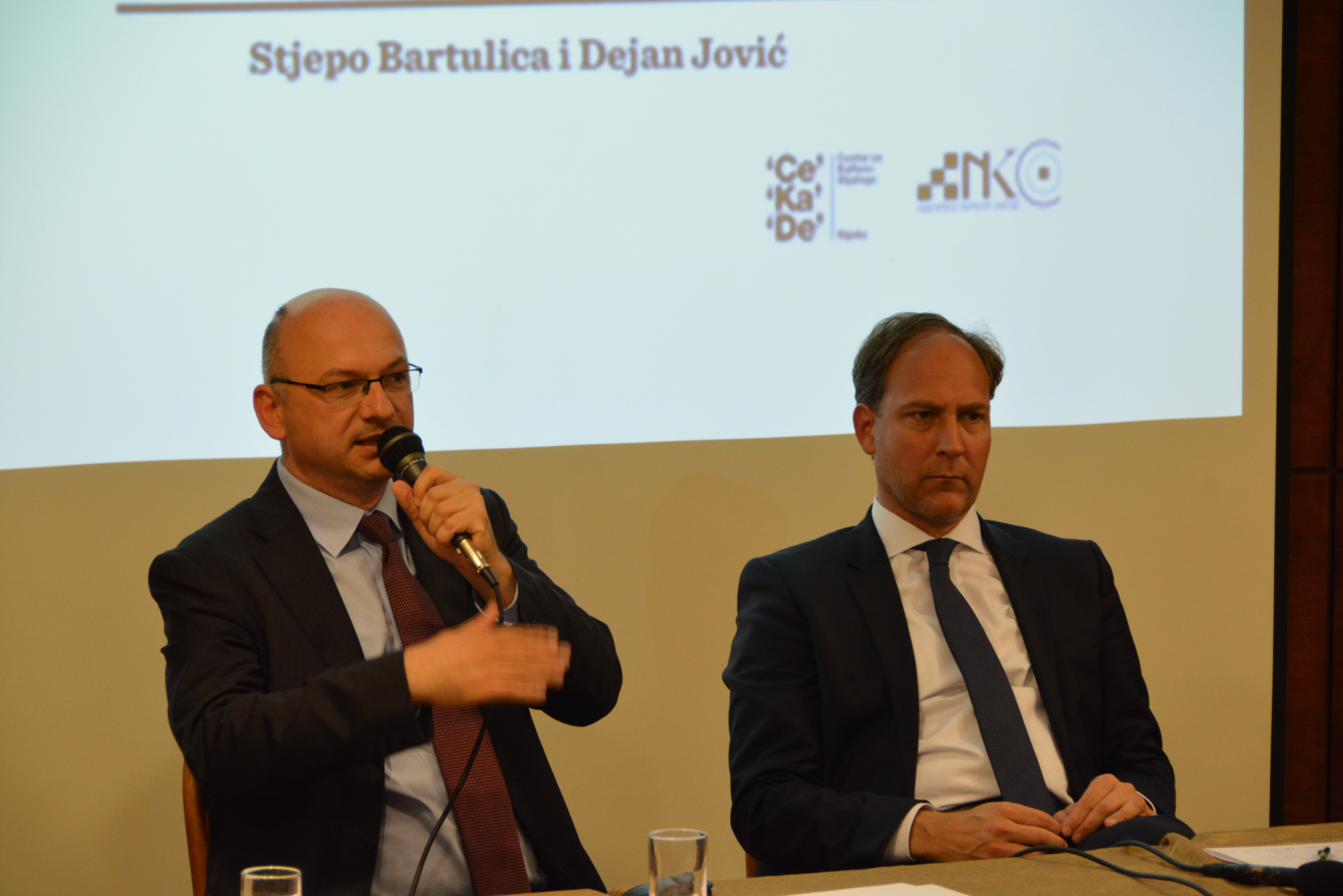
Dejan Jović and Stjepo Bartulica in HKD Napredak, Zagreb (2016).

Dejan Jović has been a Jean Monnet Fellow at the European University Institute in Florence and a lecturer at the Scottish University of Stirling. At the University of Stirling Jović was founder and director of the Centre for European Neighborhood Studies. Since 2015 he is guest professor at the University of Belgrade. Dejan Jović is the main editor of the Croatian Political Science Review journal since 2013. According to SCImago Journal Rank the Croatian Political Science Review was Q1 best quartile journal in the field of History in 2018. It was the sixth highest ranked political science and international relations journal in the entire Eastern Europe and 257th internationally among 503 ranked journals. In the field of History it was 10th among 109 ranked journals in Eastern Europe and 278th among 1217 ranked journals internationally.

== Publications ==
=== Books ===
- Uvod u Jugoslaviju (English: Introduction to Yugoslavia). Zaprešić: Fraktura; Srpsko kulturno društvo Prosvjeta, 2023.
- Rat i mit: Politika identiteta u suvremenoj Hrvatskoj (English: War and Myth: The Politics of Identity in Contemporary Croatia). Zaprešić: Fraktura. 2017.
- Yugoslavia: A State that Withered Away. West Lafayette, Indiana, United States: Purdue University Press. 2009.
- Jugoslavija - država koja je odumrla (English: Yugoslavia: A State that Withered Away). Zagreb & Belgrade: Prometej & Samizdat B92. 2003.
- Причините за распаѓањето на СФРЈ (English:Disintegration of Yugoslavia: Causes and Interpretations). Skopje: Templum. 2003.

=== Edited books ===
- Marksističke teorije međunarodnih odnosa (English: Marxist Theories of International Relations). Zagreb: Faculty of Political Science. 2018.
- Konstruktivističke teorije međunarodnih odnosa (English: Constructivist Theories of International Relations). Zagreb: Faculty of Political Science. 2016.
- Liberalne teorije međunarodnih odnosa (English: Liberal Theories of International Relations). Zagreb: Političke analize & Faculty of Political Science. 2014.
- Teorije međunarodnih odnosa: Realizam (English: Theories of International Relations: Realism). Zagreb: Politička kultura. 2013.
- Slobodan Milošević: put ka vlasti (English: Slobodan Milošević: Road to Power). Belgrade & Stirling: Institute for Contemporary History & Centre for European Neighbourhood Studies. 2008.

== Political and public engagement ==
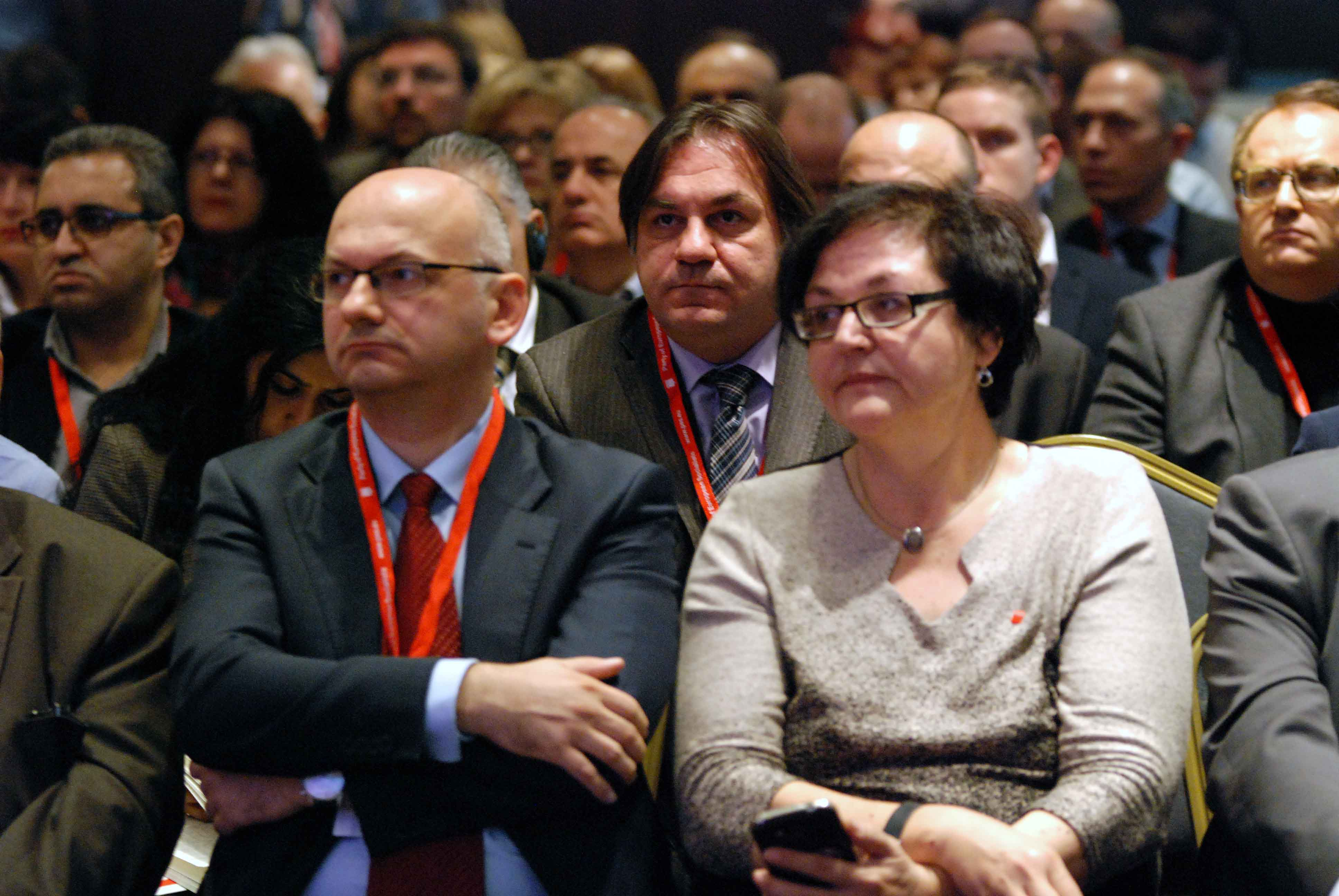
Dejan Jović next to Gordana Čomić at 2015 Challenges of Social Democracy in the Western Balkans conference in Belgrade organized by the Democratic Party and the Party of European Socialists

Jović was a special advisor at the Ministry of Foreign and European Affairs between 2004 and 2006. In the period between 2010 and 2014 Jović was the main political analyst for the President of Croatia Ivo Josipović. In 2017, he has signed the Declaration on the Common Language of the Croats, Serbs, Bosniaks and Montenegrins.

=== 2019 European Parliament election ===
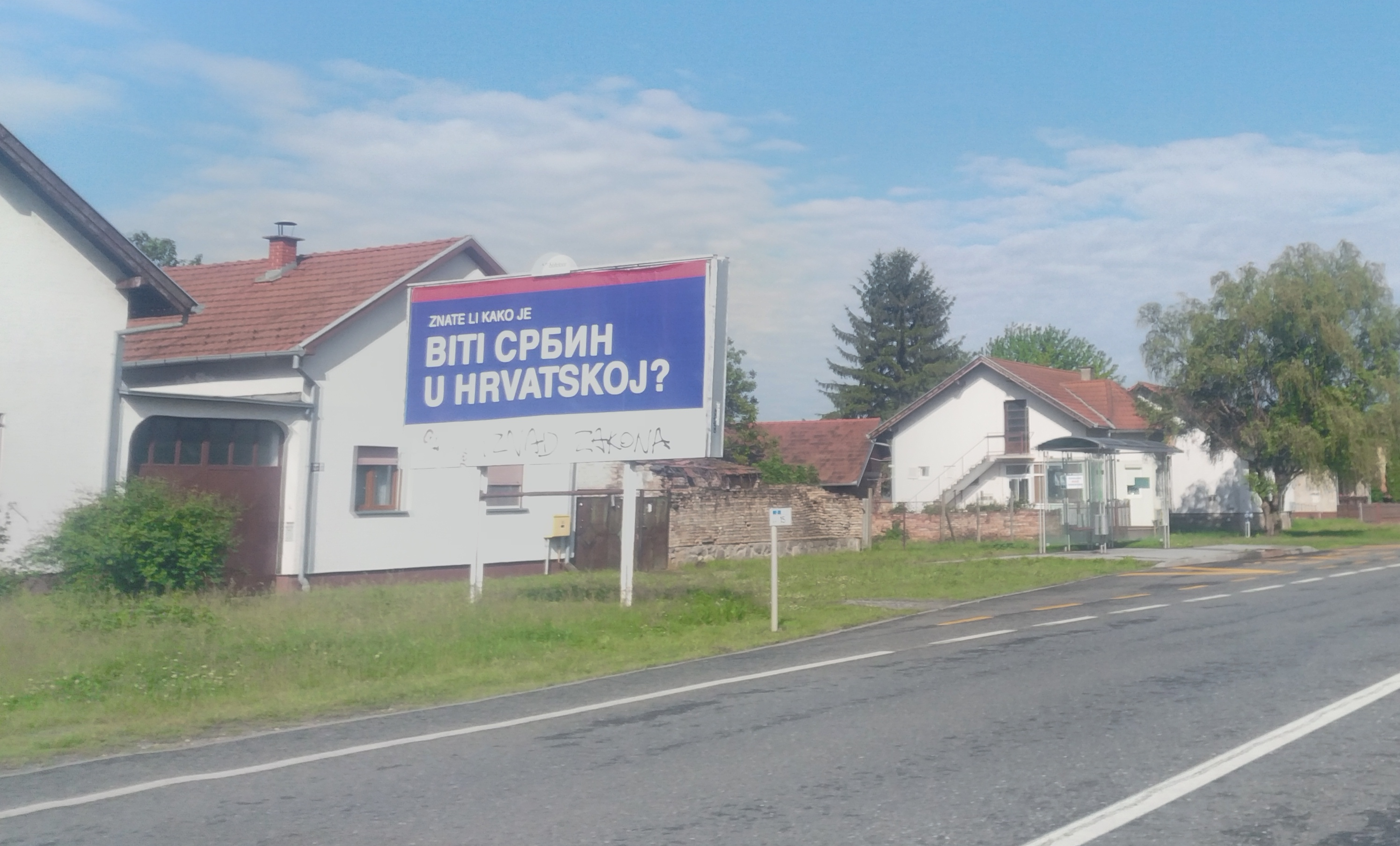
2019 election "Do you know how it is to be a Serb in Croatia?" jumbo poster in Vukovar with added graffiti stating "To be above the law".

In 2019, Jović was on the election list of the Independent Democratic Serb Party for the 2019 European Parliament election in Croatia. In an interview for Italian Osservatorio Balcani e Caucaso Transeuropa he explain his motivation to run as a non-party candidate on SDSS list by "desire to influence European politics" particularly related to Western Balkan integrations, academic duty to take active part in political life and to "express my solidarity with the Serbian community, not so much because of ethnicity, but because I think that the Serbian community is a trait of Croatia as a country". Jović was second on the list, just behind party leader Milorad Pupovac. Campaign was marked by SDSS jumbo posters with inscription "Do you know how it is to be a Serb in Croatia?" in which the word 'Serb' was written in Serbian Cyrillic. As it was expected by campaign leaders jumbo posters were target of widespread nationalist vandalism and destruction which underlined the issue of ethnic intolerance and discrimination. The party did not manage to reach 5% threshold to enter the European Parliament and instead received 28,597 votes or 2.66% yet some commentators perceived campaign as an important public relations success and results as expected.

=== Criticism and controversies ===
==== Jugoslavija – država koja je odumrla ====
Dejan Jović and his book Jugoslavija – država koja je odumrla (Yugoslavia: A State that Withered Away), published in 2003, were heavily criticized by the Serbian historian and professor of history at University of Belgrade Olivera Milosavljević in reviews and articles published by now inactive Serbian weekly magazine Republika where she claimed that the book contains numerous falsehoods, contradictions and un-academic methodology, citing his downplay of the SANU Memorandum and describing an apologetic depiction of Slobodan Milošević, among other things.

==== 2014 book review ====
In 2014, when serving as the senior advisor to the President of Croatia, in his book review for the Croatian Political Science Review Jović expresses approval of the book First Do No Harm: Humanitarian Intervention and the Destruction of Yugoslavia written by David N. Gibbs and published by the Vanderbilt University Press in 2009. Gibbs' book was criticized by Marko Hoare who accused Gibbs of denying the genocide in Srebrenica, promoting conspiracy theories and eschewing or falsifying sources. Jović's positive review of the book caused the North American Congress of Bosniaks of "silently denying Serbian aggression and genocide". Hoare previously criticized Jović's own book Slobodan Milošević's Place in Serbian History, accusing the author of being an apologist of Slobodan Milošević and the Yugoslav People's Army during the war in the 1990s. Jović responded by stating that the accusations are "completely tendentious and incorrect, and the campaign itself has political rather than academic motives", he also defended Gibbs by claiming he had never denied genocide in Srebrenica, that he is a distinguished professor of history at the University of Arizona whose book had a number of positive reviews in academic journals, and that the same people who are now accusing him as a genocide denier for a book review have previously accused many others of the same, including the Washington Times and The Guardian. His claims were, however, disputed by Hoare in a subsequent response to his response which stated: "It is dangerous to both Croatia and Bosnia and Hercegovina for someone holding such views, and with such poor analytical judgement and grasp of reality, to occupy the position that he does."

==== 2014 remarks on the 1991 Independence referendum ====
During the same year, Jović was sacked from his political advisory position by President Ivo Josipović after he claimed in his article that 1991 Croatian independence referendum was "very non-liberal. Maybe they were 'democratic' if by 'democracy' we mean only the determination of those who have more and who less [votes]. But they were certainly not liberal" and that it can not be compared with Scottish independence referendum arguing that, unlike the Croatian one, every opinion was considered legitimate and was equally present in public debate. This statement was described by President Josipović as "harmful and wrong", who expressed his opinion on the incomparability of the situation in Croatia (Yugoslav crisis) and Scotland (established democracy) at the time of two referendums. President sacked Jović quoting differences of opinion shortly before the 2014–15 Croatian presidential election, while politicians from major opposition right-wing Croatian Democratic Union (HDZ) expressed opinion that he was sacked because his opinions were damaging Josipović's re-election prospects. The left-leaning British political website OpenDemocracy opined that sacking of Jović was the result of "(re)establishment of a certain dogmatism in interpreting or discussing about the past". Balkan Insight described Jović's statements as "highly controversial", and cited denunciations by some politicians from both Social Democratic Party (SDP) and HDZ, while 24sata columnist Tomislav Klauški criticised Josipović's move instead and asked if it is possible to comment meaningfully and non-passionately the independence referendum 23 years after it took place.

==== Other criticisms ====
Former professor emeritus of history at Yale University and a consultant for the Bosnian Institute, Ivo Banac, described Jović as an "ordinary falsifier of history", while in the same interview political analyst Žarko Puhovski commended Jović's argumentation as better than average in Croatian scientific community.

In 2017, a docent at the Faculty of Political Sciences in the University of Zagreb, Krešimir Petković, filed a request for Jović to be removed from the editorial board of Croatian Political Science Review, accusing him of "giving academic legitimacy to forgeries" and the "absence of academic procedures of fact checking" following the publication of an article on Croatia–Slovenia border disputes by German political scientist and European People's Party spokesman Thomas Bickl. Petković claimed that the article was uncritical towards the Drnovšek–Račan agreement and that without evidence Bickl ascribed agreement's failure to Croatian traumatic experience in the period of the Croatian War of Independence. Petković ultimately resigned from the position of one of the reviewers for the journal.

In 2021, following Jović's statements on Twitter, in which he described President Zoran Milanović's remarks towards Bosnia and Herzegovina and Milorad Pupovac as "cultural racism", he was subsequently described by Milanović as a "Kumrovec undertail" in a Facebook post on his official profile. In his Facebook response, Milanović criticized Jović for publishing his post in English, berated his scholarly credibility and electoral legitimacy of Milorad Pupovac, stated that a Croat from Vojvodina would never dare to speak like Jović and described Belgrade as a bazaar.
