= Death to fascism, freedom to the people =

Yugoslav Partisan motto

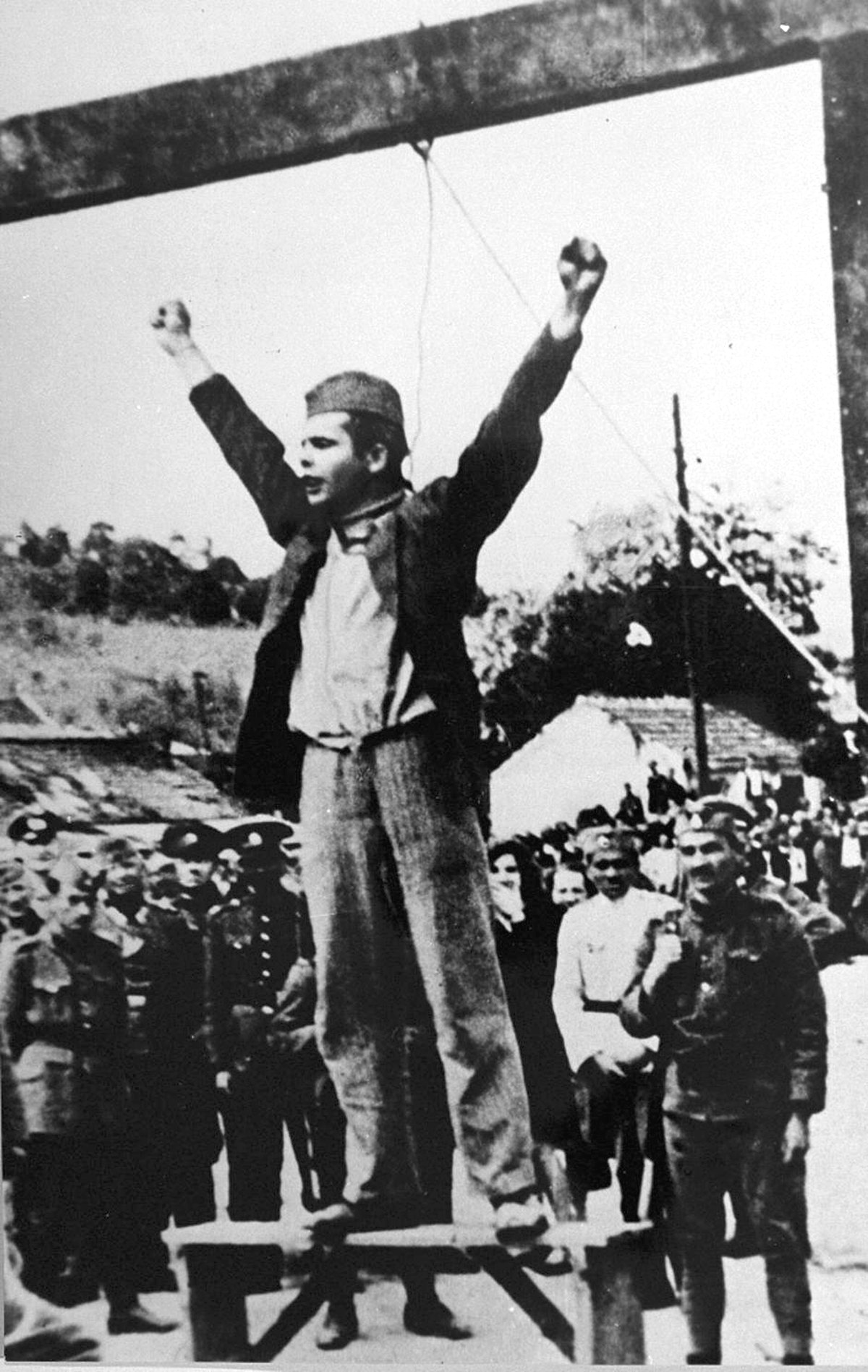
Yugoslav partisan fighter Stjepan Filipović shouting "Death to fascism, freedom to the People!" seconds before his execution by a collaborationist Serbian State Guard unit in German-occupied Valjevo

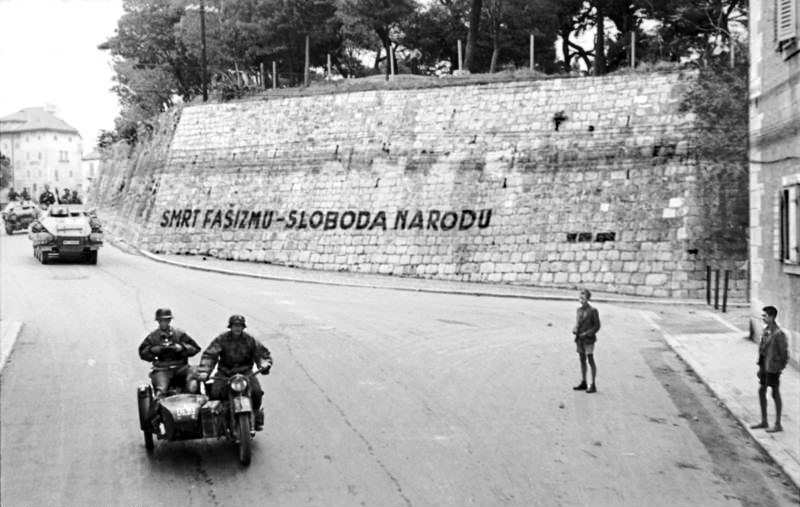
The slogan written on a wall in Split, September 1943

"Death to fascism, freedom to the people!" (Note: Serbo-Croatian: Smrt fašizmu, sloboda narodu! / Смрт фашизму, слобода народу!; Slovene: Smrt fašizmu, svoboda narodu!; Macedonian: Смрт на фашизмот, слобода на народот!, romanized: Smrt na fašizmot, sloboda na narodot!; Albanian: Vdekje fashizmit, liri popullit!) was a motto of the Yugoslav Partisans. First introduced by the Communists, it was afterward adopted as the official slogan of the entire resistance movement. Under early Yugoslav influence, Albanian Partisans also adopted the slogan. (Note: Albanian: Vdekje fashizmit, liri popullit!) During World War II and for a few subsequent years, it was also used as a greeting formulation among members of the movement, both in official and unofficial correspondence, often abbreviated as "SFSN!", or in Albanian as "VFLP!", when written and accompanied by the clenched fist salute when spoken (one person usually saying "Smrt fašizmu!", the other responding with "Sloboda narodu!"). It was frequently invoked in post-war socialist Yugoslavia and Albania.

== History ==
The slogan was part of the Communist Party of Yugoslavia's 1941 call to arms for the people of Yugoslavia. The Bulletin of the Partisan Supreme Headquarters used the slogan in its first issue dated 16 August 1941. The August 1941 edition of the Croatian daily newspaper Vjesnik, then the primary media publication of the Partisan resistance movement, featured the statement "Smrt fašizmu, sloboda narodu".

The slogan became popular after the execution of Stjepan Filipović, a Yugoslav Partisan. Filipović was hanged in Valjevo by a Serbian State Guard unit. As the rope was put around his neck on 22 May 1942, Filipović defiantly thrust his hands out and denounced the Germans and their Axis allies as murderers, shouting "Death to fascism, freedom to the people!". At this moment, a subsequently-famous photograph was taken from which a statue was cast.

== Reception ==
In a survey about hate speech conducted by the journal Politička misao in 2018, 47% of citizens in Croatia said they supported banning the public use of the slogan "Death to fascism, freedom to the people", while 41% were against its ban. The same report also documents an increase of proclivity to ban the local fascist slogan "Za dom spremni" at 50% of those surveyed. According to authors, advocacy for banning these phrases among citizens can be explained by negative historical legacy and transgenerational traumas.

== See also ==
- "They shall not pass"
- "Venceremos"
