= Drago Kovačević =

Croatian Serb politician and writer (1953–2019)

Minister of Information of the Republic of Serbian Krajina
- In office May 1995 – August 1995
- Prime Minister: Milan Babić
- Preceded by: Borivoj Rašuo
- Succeeded by: Position abolished

Mayor of Knin
- In office 1994 – August 1995
- Preceded by: Milan Babić

Personal details
- Born: 1953 Knin, Croatia, Yugoslavia
- Died: 27 November 2019 (aged 65–66) Belgrade, Serbia
- Party: Socialist Party of Croatia (–1992); Serb Democratic Party (1992–1995)

Drago Kovačević (Serbian Cyrillic: Драго Ковачевић; 1953 – November 27, 2019) was a Croatian Serb politician and writer. He lived in Belgrade, Serbia and worked for the Serbian Democratic Forum.

== Biography ==
He was Minister of Information in Milan Babić's 1995 government of the separatist Republic of Serbian Krajina. He also succeeded Babić in the role of Mayor of Knin from 1994 to 1995 while it was part of the separatist republic. He later testified at Babić's trial before the International Criminal Tribunal for the former Yugoslavia.

Kovačević was a candidate for Čedomir Jovanović's electoral list in the 2012 and 2014 Serbian parliamentary elections.

He was a contributor to the weekly Novosti and the web portal Autograf.hr.

== Works ==
- Kavez, 2003
- NK Dinara, Knin: 1913-2013; ni manjeg grada ni većeg kluba, 2013
