= Monument to the Fighters of the Revolution (Serbia) =

- Споменик борцима Револуције
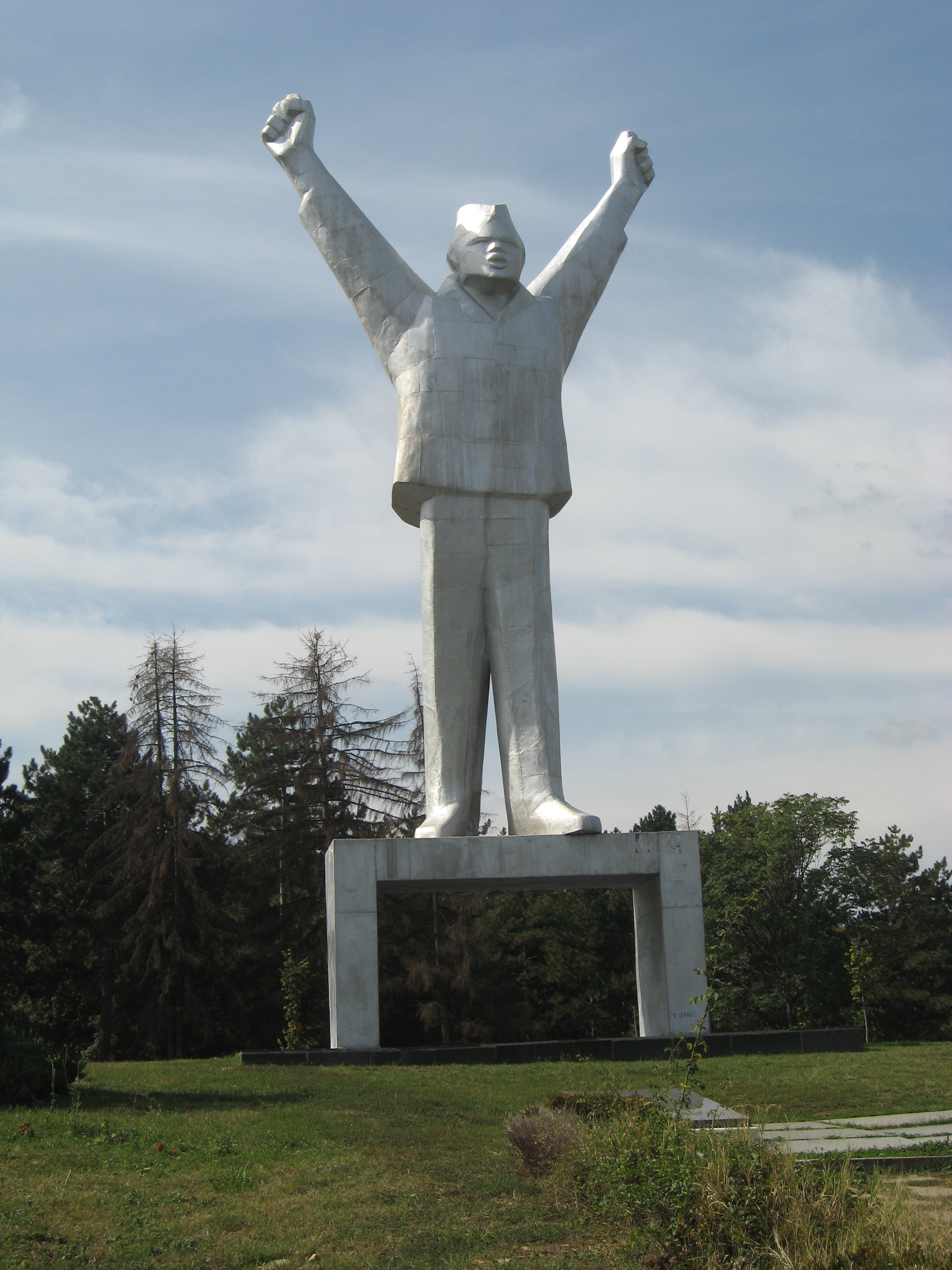
- Interactive map of Monument to the Fighters of the Revolution
- Location: Valjevo, Serbia
- Designer: Vojin Bakić
- Type: Memorial
- Material: Bronze
- Opening date: 23 October 1960
- Dedicated to: Stevan Filipović and the Partisan fighters of the Valjevo region

The Monument to the Fighters of the Revolution (Serbian Cyrillic: Споменик борцима Револуције), also known as the Monument to Stevan Filipović or simply the Valjevo Monument, is a memorial located in Valjevo, Serbia. It is dedicated to the National Hero of Yugoslavia Stevan Filipović and to the Partisan fighters from the Valjevo region who fought in the National Liberation War during World War II.

The monument was inspired by a famous photograph capturing Filipović’s final moments, in which he defiantly raised his fists and addressed the gathered crowd before his execution on 22 May 1942. The sculpture was created by the Serbian sculptor Vojin Bakić.

Situated on the plateau of Vidrak Hill overlooking the city of Valjevo, the monument dominates the surrounding landscape and is visible from the town below. The area around the monument has been landscaped as a memorial park. Before its construction, the site was home to an old municipal and military cemetery, where soldiers and hospital staff who died from typhus during the early years of World War I had been buried. Several of these older gravestones remain visible near the monument today.

Bakić’s work was officially unveiled on 23 October 1960. It is protected as a cultural monument. From an artistic standpoint, this sculpture marks a significant stage in Bakić’s creative development, following his break with socialist realism. It reflects his transition toward abstraction, characterized by the crystallization of form and an exploration of cubist principles. The Monument to Stevan Filipović is considered one of the artist’s most iconic and influential works.

== Sources ==
- Belić-Koročkin-Davidović, Mirjana; Davidović, Radivoje (2012). Stevan Filipović : istina o istorijskoj fotografiji. Beograd: Čigoja štampa. COBISS 193196812
- Maković, Zvonko (2013). "Spomenička plastika Vojina Bakića (Vojin Bakić's Memorial Monuments)". u Vojin Bakić: Svjetlonosne forme : retrospektiva : Muzej suvremene umjetnosti, 7. 12. 2013 - 2. 2. 2014. / [autori tekstova Ješa Denegri ... et al.]. Zagreb: Muzej suvremene umjetnosti. pp. 163–216. ISBN 9789537615628.
- Prelog, Milan (1953). "Djelo Vojina Bakića" (PDF). Pogledi : časopis za teoriju društvenih i prirodnih nauka. 53/12. Zagreb: Društvo nastavnika sveučilišta visokih škola i saradnika naučnih ustanova u Zagrebu: 912–919. COBISS 49155084 COBISS 174654215
