= Novosti (Croatia) =

Croatian weekly magazine

- Editor-in-chief: Nikola Bajto
- Categories: Politics, Current affairs (from a left-wing perspective)
- Frequency: Weekly
- Circulation: 8,000
- Publisher: Serb National Council
- First issue: December 1999
- Country: Croatia
- Based in: Zagreb
- Language: Croatian, Serbian
- Website: www.portalnovosti.com
- ISSN: 1845-8955

Novosti (Serbian Cyrillic: Новости, lit. 'The News') is a Croatian weekly magazine based in Zagreb, published by the Serb National Council. The organization was established in 1997, based on the provisions granting the right to self-government for Serbs in Croatia as set in the Erdut Agreement.

The magazine, billed as an "independent Serb weekly" (samostalni srpski tjednik), describes its editorial policy as being primarily concerned with covering general news and publishing "critical writing about all the relevant political, social and cultural developments in Croatia". It also deals with issues related to the Serb community in Croatia and the development of civil society.

As of 2009 its circulation is 8,000. Its editor-in-chief is Ivica Đikić, formerly of Novi list daily. Over the time magazine published interviews with Noam Chomsky, Etgar Keret, Zygmunt Bauman, Henry Giroux, Srećko Horvat, Milorad Pupovac, Chris Hedges, Jacques Rancière, Vivek Chibber, Filip David, Georges Wolinski, Mladen Ivanić, Vesna Teršelič, Andrej Nikolaidis, Mirjana Karanović, and Edvin Kanka Ćudić

In 2019, Novosti celebrated publication of its issue number 1,000 at the Croatian Journalists' Association building in Zagreb. The event was attended by Milorad Pupovac, Nadežda Čačinovič, Budimir Lončar, Ivica Đikić, Vesna Teršelič, Drago Pilsel, Hrvoje Klasić, as well as ambassadors of Serbia, Slovenia, and Norway to Croatia.

== History ==
The first meeting of the presidency of the newly established Serb National Council which took place on 12 and 13 November 1997 at the Workers' Hall, Vukovar, received the report on the initiation of the Novosti project. The report specified Vukovar as the seat of the new publication with Zagreb as a subsidiary office. In the context of the completion of the UNTAES mission of the United Nations in the Eastern Slavonia, Baranja and Western Syrmia, the Government of Croatia allocated 800,000 Croatian kuna for the new publication.

The weekly Novosti was launched by the Serb National Council in 1999 in broadsheet format as a weekly publication primarily concerned with minority politics related to Serbs of Croatia. Since its first issue the magazine adopted a policy of linguistic pluralism and featured articles written in both Croatian and Serbian, and offered a mix of sections printed in Latin and Cyrillic scripts. However, its circulation was limited to subscribers and was not widely available in newsstands for the first ten years of its existence.

In 2009 the magazine underwent an extensive makeover in an effort to transform it into a weekly magazine which would also appeal to the mainstream public, with more space dedicated to commentary pieces and coverage of nationally significant political and cultural events, as well as investigative journalism. To that extent, the magazine hired a number of prominent columnists and intellectuals as commentators, including Viktor Ivančić (formerly of Feral Tribune), Boris Dežulović, Vladimir Arsenijević, Tomislav Jakić, and Igor Mandić, and was for the first time made available for purchase at newsstands.

The 2025 budget for Novosti was cut by 35%, which was condemned by the International Press Institute.

== Criticism ==
Political satire and social commentary are an integral part of editorial policy at Novosti. This at some points caused strong criticism among some Croatian nationalists with dogmatic views on historical events such as Croatian War of Independence, who saw ridicule of militarism, Croatian military and national symbols as unacceptable excess of limits of freedom of speech. Some of them were calling for cancellation of funding the newspapers from public money, criminal prosecution or censorship. Some mainstream politicians in Croatia, including the president Kolinda Grabar-Kitarović, warned the editors that they shall take care what they are writing about implicitly calling them to use self-censorship. President stated that she consider journal satire to be inappropriate and similar to cartoons of Muhammad in foreign press such as Charlie Hebdo. On 4 April 2017 Reporters Without Borders condemned "a campaign of lawsuits and verbal attacks that Croatian nationalist groups have been orchestrating for several months against Novosti, the newspaper of Croatia’s Serbian minority." Some of the sentences published in Novosti that made part of the Croatian public feel insulted were the following:

"Asshole Croatia is a nation state of assholes and their public service"

"Scientists brag that they found the reason for existence of an appendix, while for Croatian sovereignty, up to this day, no one knows what it serves for, or does it even exists...."

Initiators of the petition for repeal of the funding refer to the same tender criterion which enabled the funding of Novosti, which states: "those who promote intolerance towards any national minority or majority will be banned from contesting on [this] tender in period of 3 years."

== Contributors ==
- Drago Kovačević

== See also ==
- Tragovi: Journal for Serbian and Croatian Topics
- Feral Tribune
- Književni jug (1918–1919)
- Novi Plamen (2007–2015)
- Serbs of Croatia
