= Stjepan Filipović =

Yugoslav communist (1916–1942)

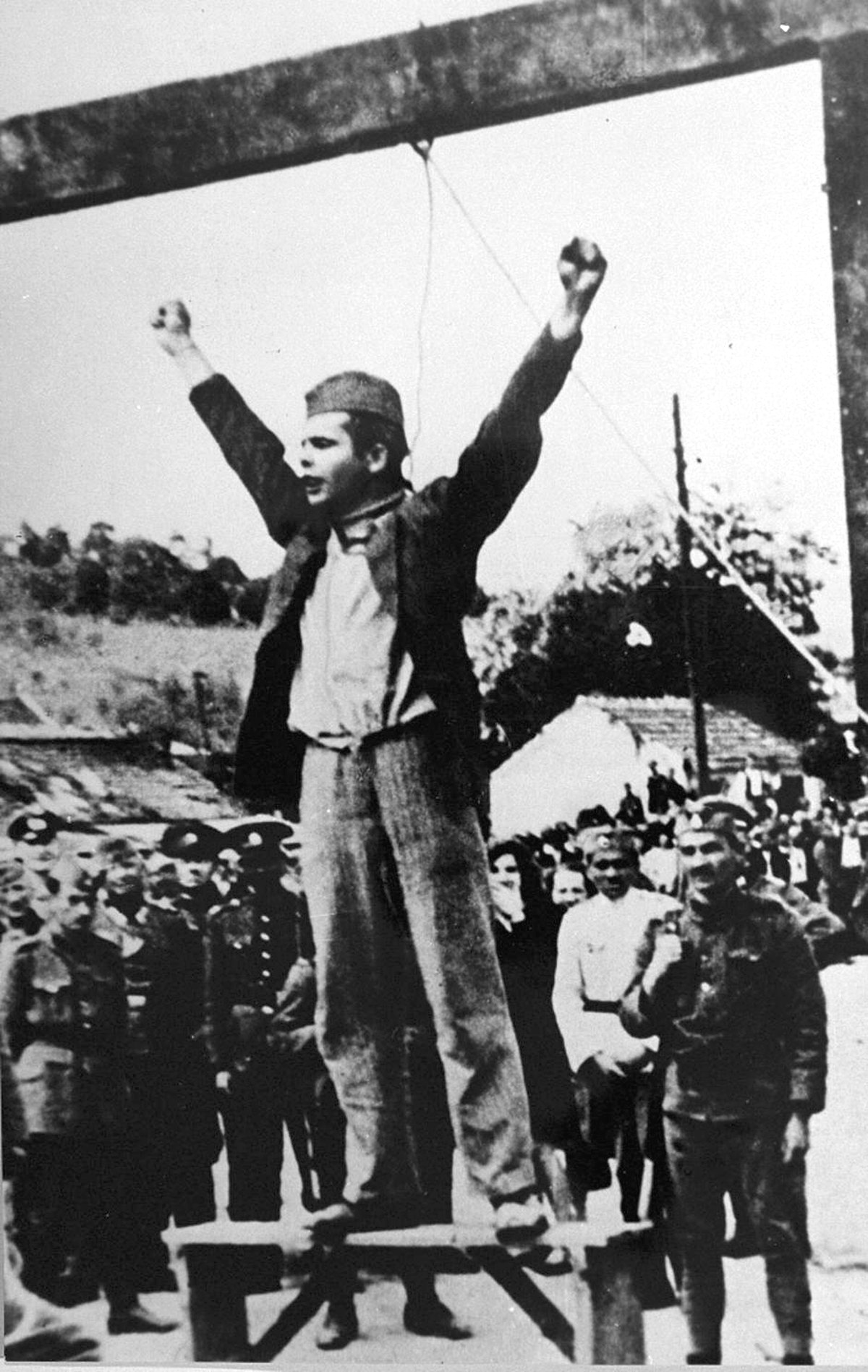
- Filipović at his execution on 22 May 1942
- Born: 27 January 1916; Opuzen, Kingdom of Dalmatia, Austria-Hungary
- Died: 22 May 1942 (aged 26); Valjevo, German-occupied Serbia
- Cause of death: Execution by hanging
- Honours: Order of the People's Hero

Stjepan Filipović (27 January 1916 – 22 May 1942) was a Yugoslav communist who led the Kolubara Company of the Valjevo Partisan Detachment during the 1941 Partisan uprising. He was captured and executed in 1942 in Valjevo. A photo of him taken shortly before his execution became a symbol of resistance against fascism in the Second World War, and was, among others, exhibited in the United Nations building in New York. He was proclaimed People's Hero of Yugoslavia in 1949.

== Biography ==
Stjepan Filipović was born on 27 January 1916 in Opuzen (modern-day Croatia) as the fifth child of Anton and Ivka Filipović. He was an ethnic Croat. The Filipović family moved throughout the Kingdom of Yugoslavia, so he lived in Županja, Mostar and Kragujevac. In Kragujevac, he studied locksmithing and mastered the basics of electrical wiring, carpentry and bookbinding. He joined the labour movement in 1937, but he was arrested in 1939 and sentenced to a year in prison. He joined the Communist Party of Yugoslavia in 1940.

== Death ==
When World War II in Yugoslavia started, the Partisans organized a Tamnava-Kolubara unit in Valjevo (modern-day Serbia) in 1941, and Filipović became its commander. He was captured on 24 December 1941 by the Chetniks of Kosta Pećanac.

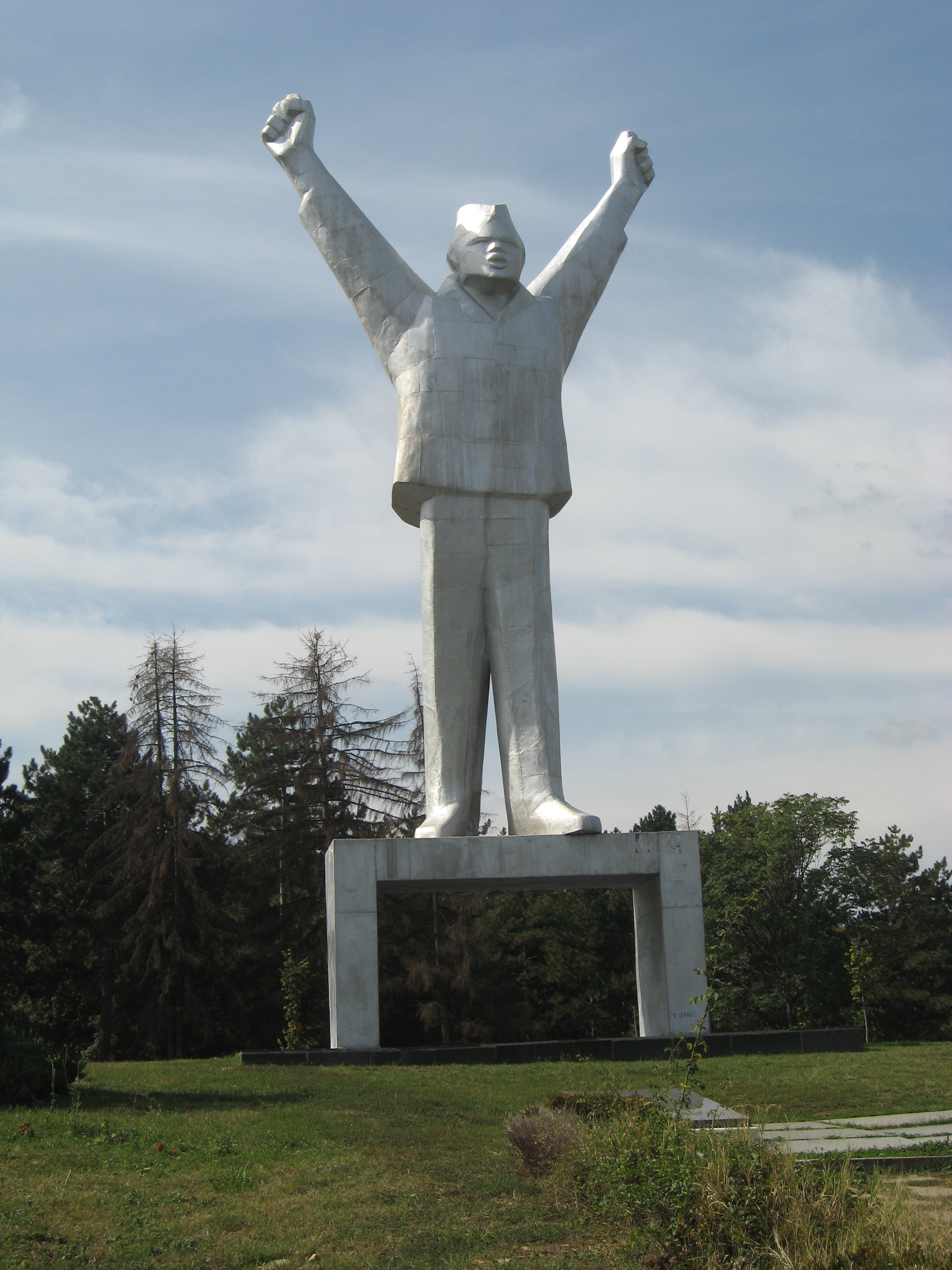
Monument to Filipović in Valjevo

On 22 May 1942, aged 26, Filipović was hanged in Valjevo by a Serbian State Guard unit. As the rope was put around his neck, Filipović raised his arms and shouted Smrt fašizmu, sloboda narodu! ("Death to fascism, freedom to the people!"). He urged the Yugoslav people to resist and implored them to never cease resisting. A photograph taken at this moment was widely reproduced and became a symbol of anti-fascist resistance. A statue of Filipović was cast, depicting his defiance at the gallows.

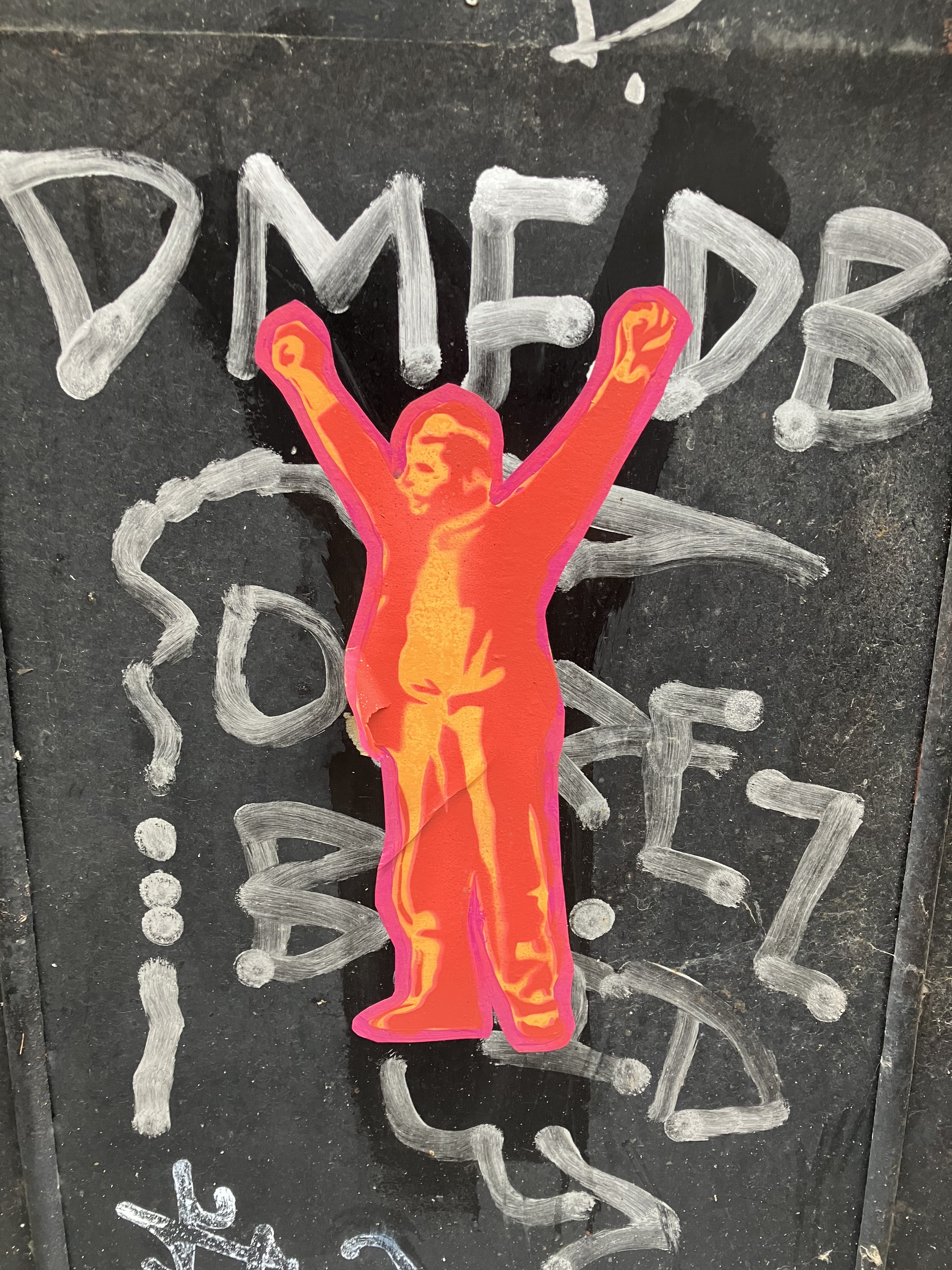
Stjepan Filipović paste-up in Belgrade

Filipović was declared a National Hero of Yugoslavia on 14 December 1949. The town of Valjevo has a statue dedicated to him, "Stevan Filipović". A monument was also erected in his home town of Opuzen in 1968, but was demolished in 1991.

His brother Šimun was shot by Germans in the Kragujevac massacre in Serbia; although he was an ethnic Croat, which could have saved him from death, he refused to say so, sharing his fate with citizens of Kragujevac. Stjepan's second brother Nikola was killed in May 1943 as a member of the 1st Proletarian Brigade.
