= Museum of Serbs of Croatia =

Defunct museum in Zagreb

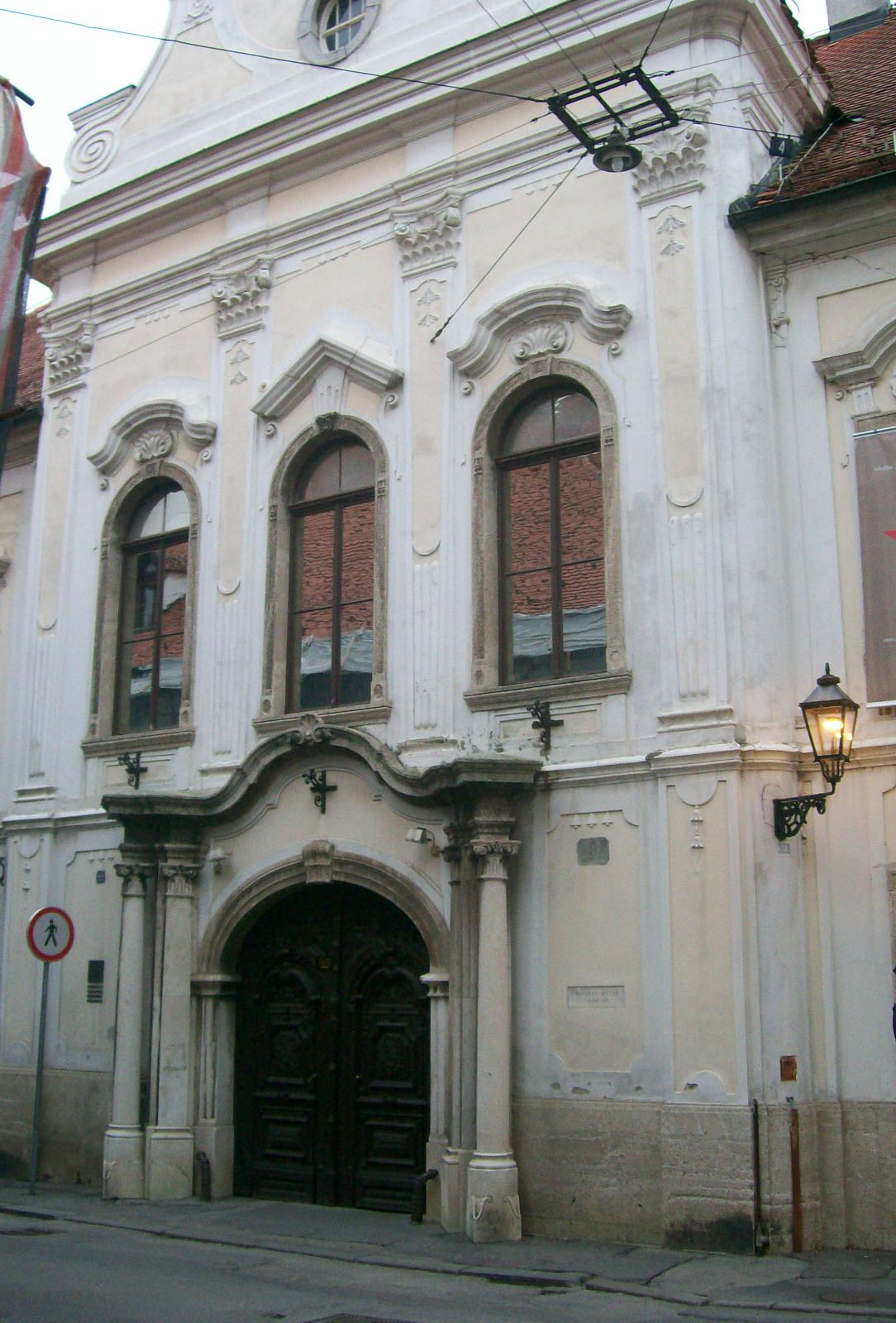
- In 1963 Museum of Serbs of Croatia became part of Museum of Croatian History
- Established: 1946
- Dissolved: 1963
- Location: Zagreb, Socialist Republic of Croatia

Museum of Serbs of Croatia (Serbo-Croatian: Muzej Srba u Hrvatskoj, Музеј Срба у Хрватској) was a public museum in Zagreb, which was specialized in history of Serbs of Croatia. Museum existed from 1946 till 1963 when it became part of Croatian History Museum. Today, part of the material is kept in Museum of Metropolitanate of Zagreb and Ljubljana, part in Prosvjeta, some in Museum of Croatian History and part of them were destroyed in mining of Museum of Metropolitanate of Zagreb and Ljubljana on 11 April 1992 during War in Croatia. In 2009, on 65 anniversary of Prosvjeta, organization has launched an initiative for restoration of museum work.

== History ==
During the World War II group of Croatian museum professionals collected some number of artifacts from churches and monasteries of Serbian Orthodox Church in Independent State of Croatia that escaped Ustaše destruction, and stored them in Museum of Arts and Crafts. After the end of war in 1946, on initiative of Main Board of Serbs in Croatia and Prosvjeta, from material from these collection and added non-religious materials, was established Museum of Serbs of Croatia as part of Museum of Arts and Crafts. In early in 1948 it became part of Museum of Croatian History. Since 1963 museum as division was annexed to Museum of Croatian History and after few years that division were dissolved.

== Sections ==
The museum collection was divided into five halls:

- 1.Since settling in Croatia till Great Serb Migrations in 1690
- 2.Art and craft works of the 18th century
- 3.Church, army and people in the 18th century
- 4.Citizenry and Enlightenment at the turn of the 18th into the 19th century
- 5.Exhibition of paintings by Serbian painters from Croatia

== See also ==
- List of museums in Croatia
- Serbs of Croatia
- Archives of Serbs in Croatia
