= Tomislav Jakić =

- Born: 23 March 1943 (age 83); Zagreb, Croatia
- Education: University of Zagreb
- Occupations: Journalist, television reporter

Tomislav Jakić (born 23 March 1943, Zagreb) is a Croatian journalist, TV reporter and former advisor to the 2nd Croatian president Stjepan Mesić.

== Early years ==
Tomislav Jakić was born on 23 March 1943 in Zagreb, Independent State of Croatia during World War II. His father was a state clerk and his mother was a teacher of German language. He spent his early life in Zagreb and graduated from the Faculty of Law, University of Zagreb.

Before graduating from his faculty, he decided to enter TV journalism and in 1966 he joined the Yugoslav Radio Television (JRT). At first, he worked as a small-time reporter but gradually he became a TV anchor and later a foreign policy reporter. One of his first assignments was a report about the Yom Kippur War in 1973 when he travelled to Egypt and was amongst the first foreign TV news crews to enter Sinai.

In the 1980s he went on a journalist seminar in the United States and was the first foreign TV reporter to enter a NORAD underground base in the Rocky Mountains. In 1979, he managed to negotiate in Vienna the opportunity of closely reporting the signing of the SALT II agreement which was supposed to be reserved only for American and Soviet TV crews but Jakić managed to include the Yugoslav crew as well. Due to his excellent knowledge of the German language, he was a regular reporter from Austria, West Germany and East Germany.

Working as a reporter at JRT in the 1960s, Jakić refused to enter the League of Communists of Croatia which was not a common thing to do. It affected him in doing his job. He was banned from reporting on high-profile Yugoslav politicians (especially Tito) and he was removed from news cases that involved going out of the country. After a few years, he was allowed to do reports outside the country but he remained banned from Tito.

Jakić was allowed to report on Tito only twice. Once he followed him in Austria and the second time in the Netherlands. In the 1970s, Jakić was approached by the Yugoslav secret police UDBA. He was asked to inform them about his trips abroad but he refused. For a while, he was under pressure but eventually they backed off him.

== Later career ==
In the late 1980s, he became editor of the news programme at JRT. In 1990, after the first Croatian parliamentary election, Franjo Tuđman came to power as president. Jakić was asked to be the main reporter on Tuđman's tour in the United States and Canada in autumn of that year. Jakić reported numerous incidents associated with Ustaše supporters during that tour, including the one where Franjo Tuđman almost held a speech under a picture of Ante Pavelić in Canada.

After his return from the tour, Jakić started witnessing the deterioration of his TV station which came under the rule of the new government and later renamed HRT. At first, all ethnic Serb or mixed-marriage employees were fired and banned from entering the station. After that, any employees who didn't support Tuđman and the new regime were also fired and banned. Jakić was critical of the new right-wing regime. In 1992, he quit his job at HRT.

In 1995 he moved to Prague and started working for Radio Free Europe. He reported on Croatia and the Croatian War of Independence. He wrote articles about the Croatian war crimes in Operation Storm. Soon later he returned to Croatia where for some time he wasn't able to find a job. At the time, he was invited by Silvije Degen to join the Social Democratic Action of Croatia where he became the party secretary for a couple of years.

In 1999, he returned to TV for the last time. He was called in Rijeka to become the TV director at Channel Rijeka which was under the control of the main opposition party, the Social Democratic Party of Croatia. He organised the first live coverage of the traditional Rijeka Carnival and organised the debate for the Croatian presidential election, 2000. In 2001, he resigned after his idea proposals were turned down.

== Advisor to Stjepan Mesić ==
After Tuđman's death in 1999 and the victory of the liberal-left coalition in the 2000 Croatian parliamentary election, Jakić tried to regain his old job at HRT but was offered only a job as TV director of the HRT Split local branch. He turned the offer down.

In 2000, he sent a job application to president Stjepan Mesić, who had won the presidential elections earlier that year. After some time and pressure, Jakić was accepted and became the president's advisor on foreign policy. He was not only his advisor but also wrote most of his speeches. Jakić was responsible for the buildup of new relations with the Federal Republic of Yugoslavia.

He went to Belgrade in 2001 and signed a document which was the beginning of the bilateral relationship between the Federal Republic of Yugoslavia and Croatia. After the September 11 attacks, Jakić and Mesić were strong supporters of an anti-terrorist global league. The idea never came to a true realisation. In 2002, Jakić wrote a speech for Stjepan Mesić in which he explicitly criticized the idea of a US-led military intervention in Iraq, upsetting the American diplomats. He was instrumental in Mesić's decision not to send Croatian troops to Iraq without UN approval.

Jakić gave his resignation to president Mesić in 2003 and became a columnist for Slobodna Dalmacija, in which he wrote in a column called Parallels. He wrote about foreign policy and the column lasted for about a year. He gave advice to Mesić for his 2005 campaign, and after Mesić won the elections for his second term, Jakić returned to his old advisory job.

Jakić was an organiser of the 2007 energy summit in Zagreb, where one of the guests was Vladimir Putin. The plan was to bring the South Stream through Croatia but it was never realised.

In 2010, president Mesić ended his second and final term as president. Jakić followed the president's footsteps and retired from politics. As of 2016, he is a columnist for Novosti and deals primarily with foreign policy. He published an autobiography in 2010 titled Nisam zavijao s vukovima (I didn't howl with the wolves).

In 2017, Jakić signed the Declaration on the Common Language of the Croats, Serbs, Bosniaks and Montenegrins.
