= Croatian Political Science Review =

- Discipline: Political science
- Language: Croatian and English
- Edited by: Dejan Jović (since 2013)

Publication details
- History: 1964–present
- Publisher: Faculty of Political Science of the University of Zagreb (Croatia)
- Frequency: quarterly in Croatian annually in English
- Open access: open access

Standard abbreviations
- ISO 4: Croat. Political Sci. Rev.

Indexing
- ISSN: 0032-3241 (print); 1846-8721 (web)

Links
- Journal homepage

Croatian Political Science Review (Croatian: Politička misao, literal translation: Political Thought) is the oldest academic journal published by the Faculty of Political Science of the University of Zagreb in Croatia. It is one of the leading interdisciplinary social sciences journals in Croatia and in the countries of the former Socialist Federal Republic of Yugoslavia. Croatian Political Science Review is published quarterly in Croatian and an annual English edition has been published since 1992. The journal was established in 1964 and its articles are regularly available in Academic Search Complete, Political Science Complete, SocINDEX, Central and Eastern European Online Library, ProQuest, Directory of Open Access Journals, Portal of scientific journals of Croatia and other platforms.

According to SCImago Journal Rank the Croatian Political Science Review was Q1 best quartile journal in the field of History in 2018. It was the sixth highest ranked political science and international relations journal in the entire Eastern Europe and 257th internationally among 503 ranked journals. In the field of History it was 10th among 109 ranked journals in Eastern Europe and 278th among 1217 ranked journals internationally.

== See also ==
- List of political science journals
