= Archives of Serbs in Croatia =

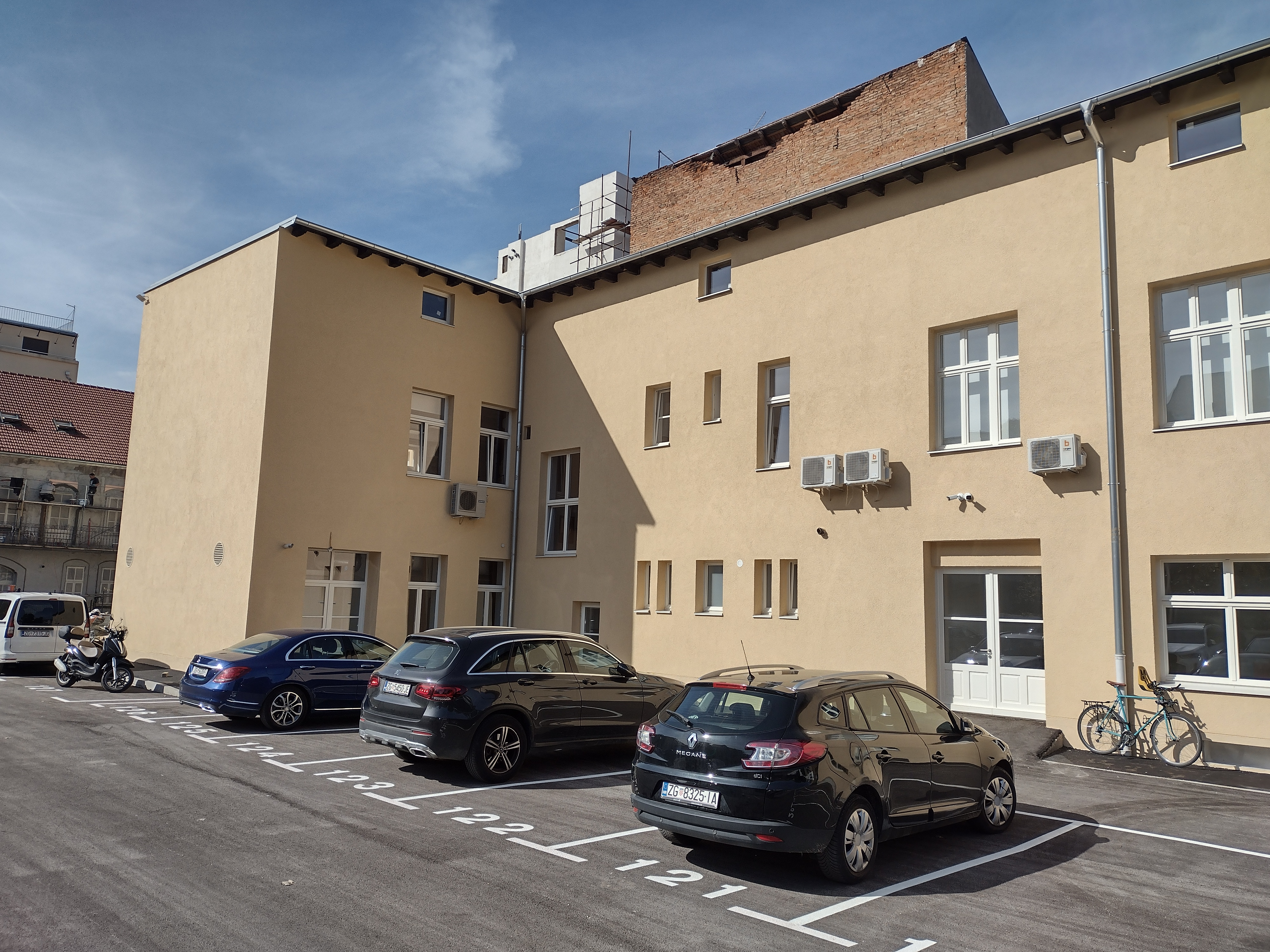
- The archives building

Agency overview
- Formed: 2006; 20 years ago
- Headquarters: Preradovićeva 21, Zagreb, Croatia; 45°48′35″N 15°58′28″E
- Parent agency: Serb National Council & SKD Prosvjeta
- Website: Archives of Serbs in Croatia

The Archives of Serbs in Croatia (Serbo-Croatian: Архив Срба у Хрватској, Arhiv Srba u Hrvatskoj) in Zagreb is the central minority-run institution responsible for preservation of archival materials related to Serbs of Croatia. The archive collects materials related to the history of Serbs in Croatia to ensure greater security and accessibility of existing materials in one place.

The institution was established in 2006 by the Serb National Council, an elected political, consulting and coordinating body, and cultural and scientific organization SKD Prosvjeta. The archive is supervised by the Croatian State Archives, is a part of the Croatian Archival Information System, and adheres to the International Standard for Describing Institutions with Archival Holdings (ISDIAH) standards. The archive is the primary publisher of the peer-reviewed open access academic journal Tragovi: Journal for Serbian and Croatian Topics.

== History ==
The archives originally focused on collecting documentation related to the Serb National Council but has expanded their scope over the years to include a wide range of materials on the history of Serbs in Croatia, including materials from families, individuals, and copied documents from other institutions like the Croatian State Archives. The archive was initially led by Filip Škiljan. Over the years they have expanded its scope to include a wide range of materials related to the history of Serbs in Croatia. In 2008, the Croatian State Archives officially granted the Archives of Serbs in Croatia a license as a recognizing it as a creator of archival material.

Since 2018, the Archives of Serbs in Croatia has co-published the journal Tragovi: Journal for Serbian and Croatian Topics. Edited by Dejan Jović, this academic publication concentrates on Croatia–Serbia relations and encompasses a multidisciplinary approach, covering historical, political, legal, economic, cultural, and various other subjects. In 2020 archive organized a conference commemorating 25th anniversary of the signing of Erdut Agreement.

== Collections and access ==
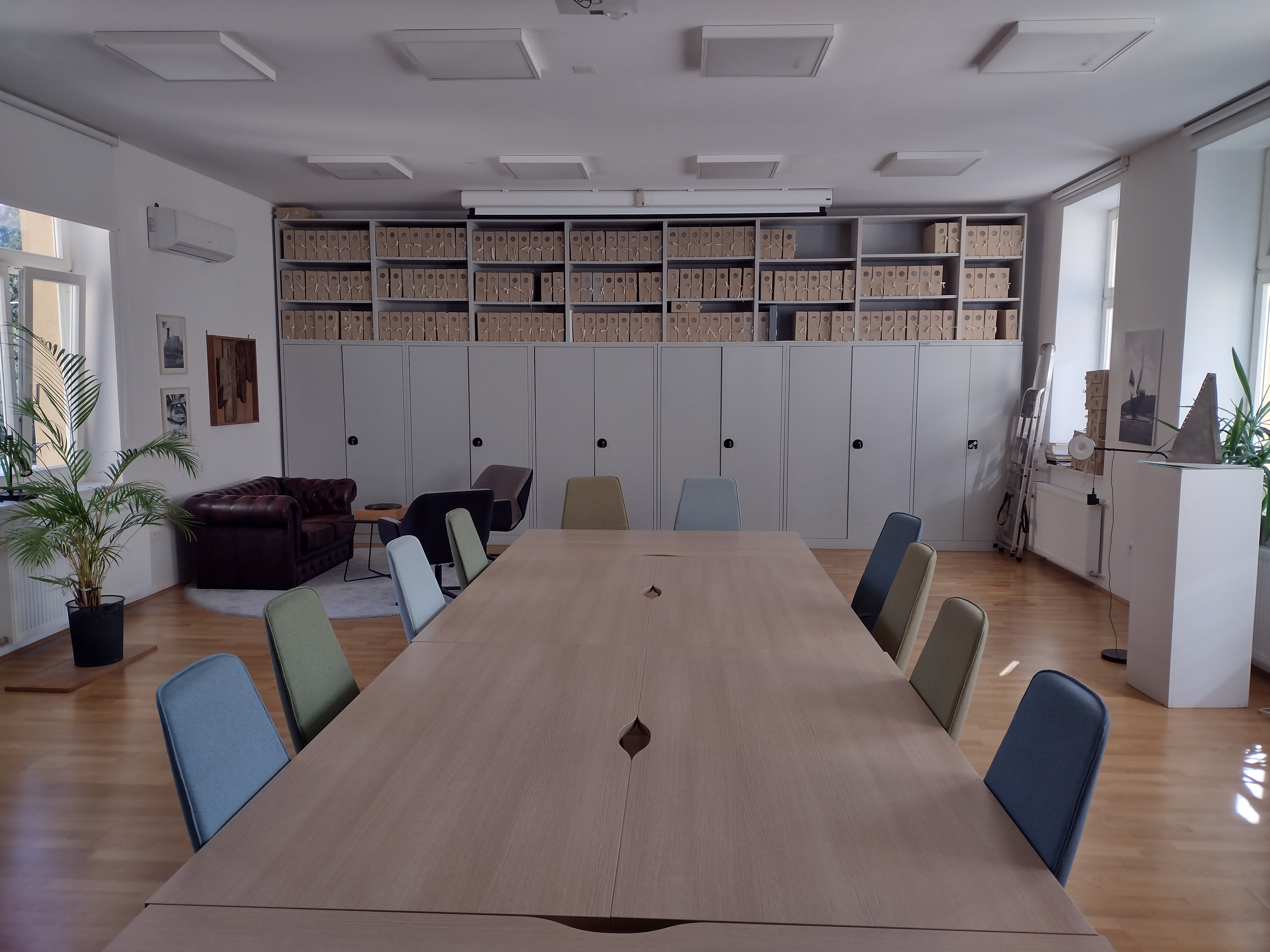
Main reading room

The Archives of Serbs in Croatia preserve original materials generated by the activities of the Serbian National Council (since 1997), various organizations, and the work of prominent individuals. As of 2023, the Archives preserved between 110 and 120 meters of archival material. It also holds copies of documents related to Serbs in Croatia, sourced from state archives, cultural institutions, as well as from organizations like the Serb Democratic Forum, the Independent Democratic Serb Party, the Serbian Orthodox Church in Croatia, the Joint Council of Municipalities, and others.

The institution houses personal collections, including those of prominent individuals such as Divna Zečević, Milorad Pupovac, Svetozar Livada, Slavko Goldstein, Vojin Bakić, and others. The archives also house audio-visual materials, including oral histories of events significant to the political and cultural history of Serbs in Croatia. Furthermore, the archive includes substantial materials related to the National Liberation War during World War II and materials related to the Yugoslav Wars of the 1990s, alongside a library of several thousand books and a comprehensive collection of press materials from the Serbian community, including publications like Novosti, Prosvjeta, Ljetopis SKD Prosvjeta, Bijela pčela, Artefakati and Identitet.

== See also ==
- List of archives in Croatia
- Serbs of Zagreb
- Museum of Serbs of Croatia
