= Central and Eastern European Online Library =

Repository of digital documents

Logo

The Central and Eastern European Online Library (CEEOL) is a repository of full text indexed documents in the fields of Humanities and Social Science publications from and about Central and Eastern Europe. The collections include native language sources from and about Central, East and Southeast Europe's humanities and social sciences in the form of journal articles, eBooks and grey literature.

The subject areas include anthropology, culture and society, economy, gender studies, history, Judaic studies, fine arts, literature, linguistics, political sciences and social sciences, philosophy, religion, law.

Updated daily, the CEEOL coverage grows by approximately 4,000 newly included journal articles every month. A significant number of the included journals are represented with a complete archival collection. The CEEOL eBook collection development started in 2016 offering an ever-growing number of eBooks, as well as backlists of the publishing houses. The CEEOL Grey Literature Collection project provides researchers with access to more than 4,000 grey literature items.

CEEOL may be considered as the virtual successor of Palais Jalta – Ost/West Europäisches Kulturzentrum eV (East/West European Cultural Centre “Palais Jalta”), a non-profit organisation that organized a significant number of symposia, political and cultural debates, and exhibitions between 1989-2003 with a focus on Central, East and Southeast European societies, their cultures and issues.

The first release of CEEOL was developed in 1999 and was operated until the end of 2015 by Questa.Soft GmbH in Frankfurt am Main. A redeveloped, cloud-based CEEOL repository was launched on 1 January 2016 and is operated by the Central and Eastern European Online Library GmbH (CEEOL GmbH) in Frankfurt am Main.
