= SKD Prosvjeta =

Serbian cultural and scientific organization

Serbian Cultural Society Prosvjeta

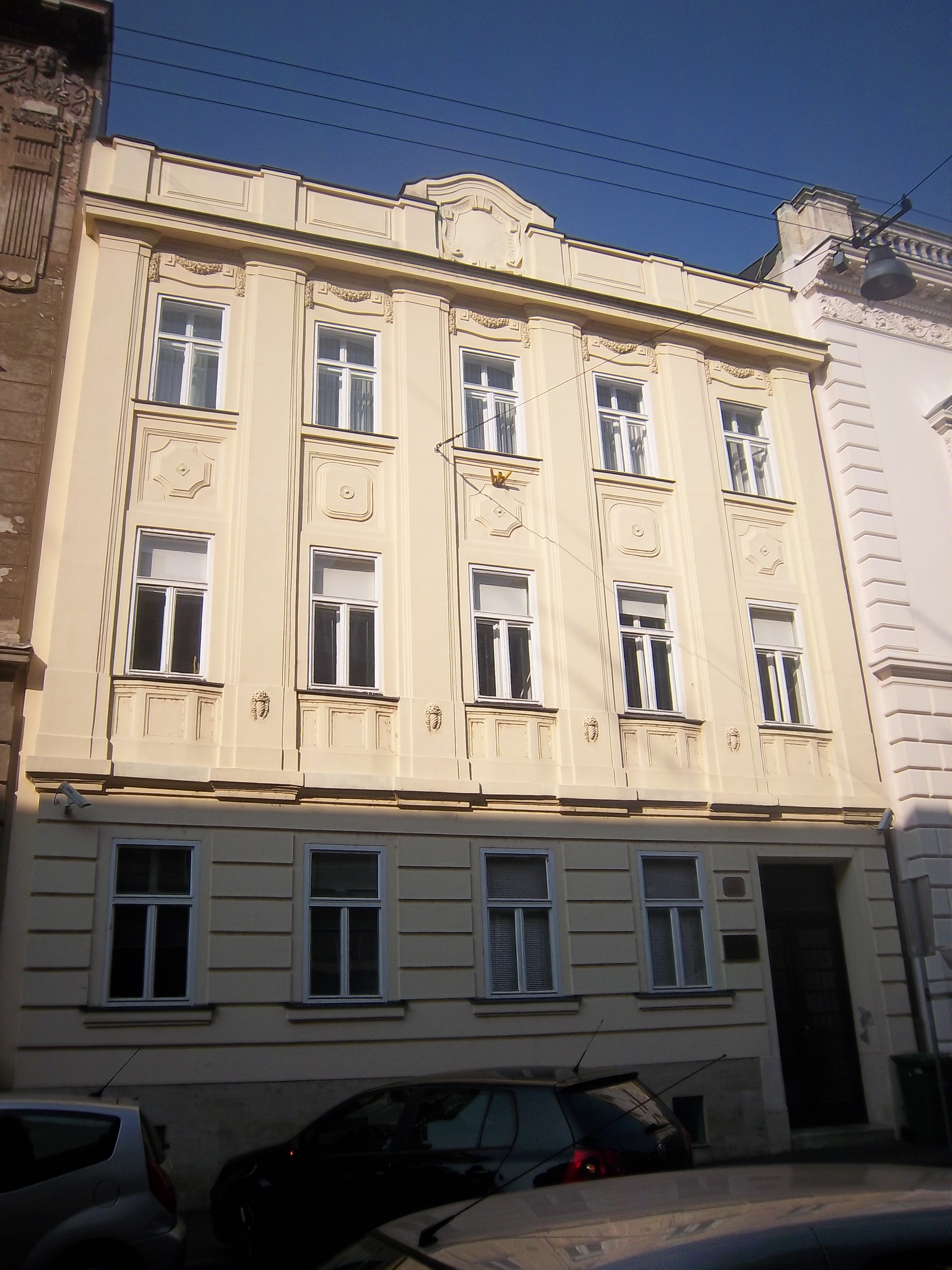
- SKD Prosvjeta headquarters in Zagreb
- Formation: 1944
- Type: non-governmental organization
- Headquarters: Zagreb
- Members: 2,200
- Official language: Serbian
- President: Nikola Vukobratović
- Budget: 1,800,000 €
- Website: skd-prosvjeta.hr

The Serbian Cultural Society "Prosvjeta" (Serbian: српско културно друштво „Просвјета“, СКД „Просвјета“, srpsko kulturno društvo „Prosvjeta“, SKD „Prosvjeta“) is an independent, non-governmental cultural and scientific organization for promoting culture of and among Serbs of Croatia.

The organization was established during World War II in Yugoslavia on 18 November 1944 under the auspices of the State Anti-fascist Council for the National Liberation of Croatia, during the genocide of Serbs in the Nazi puppet state of Croatia. In 1971, together with Matica hrvatska, it was disbanded on the grounds of promotion of nationalism and remained closed until 1993.

== History ==
The SKD Prosvjeta was established on 18 November 1944 during the World War II in the town of Glina. It was established as one among few new Serb institutions, first of which was Serb MP's club of the State Anti-fascist Council for the National Liberation of Croatia. First president of the SKD Prosvjeta was professor Dane Medaković from Zagreb.

As the prospect of an Allied and Partisan victory in World War II became increasingly likely, the Communist Party of Yugoslavia sought to address the demands of the Prečani - Serbs living in the territories of present-day Croatia and Bosnia-Herzegovina - who had been the primary victims of the Ustaše regime’s systematic persecution and mass atrocities in the Independent State of Croatia. Prečani Serbs initially constituted a significant majority, and towards the end of the war large segment of the entire Yugoslav Partisan forces, while in 1945 they also constituted 43% of membership of the Communist Party of Croatia. Primary task of the new organization in the initial period was to fight illiteracy in rural areas. Other ambitious plans included intention to establish the future Museum of Serbs of Croatia, central library, student dormitory as well as to develop cooperation with Croatian Writers' Association, Croatian Painters' Association, Music Association and Association for Cultural Cooperation with Soviet Union.

During the Croatian Spring (Maspok), a political conflict that took place from 1967 to 1971 in the Socialist Republic of Croatia, SKD Prosvjeta came to the forefront of Croatian Serb nationalist discourse. A plan put forward by the League of Communists of Croatia reformists to revise elementary and middle school literature and history curricula so 75 percent of the coverage would be on Croatian topics drew complaints from SKD Prosvjeta, which argued that the plan was a threat to Serb cultural rights. SKD Prosvjeta also objected to the League of Communists of Croatia's attempts to reinterpret the wartime Partisan struggle as a liberation of Croatian nation within the Yugoslav framework. By 1971, SKD Prosvjeta demanded that the Serbian language and Cyrillic script be officially used in Croatia alongside the Croatian language and Latin script, as well as legislative safeguards guaranteeing the ethnic equality of Serbs. SKD Prosvjeta rejected the federal model advocated by the ZAVNOH and the League of Communists of Croatia, arguing that nationalism was no longer needed in Yugoslavia. Furthermore, SKD Prosvjeta denounced the work of Matica hrvatska and asserted that the Serbs of Croatia would preserve their ethnic identity by relying on Serbia's help regardless of the borders of the republics.

Finally, SKD Prosvjeta's Rade Bulat demanded the establishment of an autonomous province for the Croatian Serbs, and there were calls to grant autonomy for Dalmatia as well. The Central Committee of the League of Communists of Croatia declared that no region of Croatia could make any legitimate claim to autonomy of any kind and labeled calls for regional Dalmatian autonomy as treason to the Croatian nation. Such responses were in line with the League of Communists of Croatia's objective of national homogenisation. To that end, the League of Communists of Croatia blocked the option of declaring one's ethnic identity as regional in the 1971 census. In 1971, after Maspok, organization work was suspended together with work of Matica hrvatska.

Initiative for reactivation of SKD Prosvjeta work came in 1990, and it was implemented in 1993.

== Central Library of Serbs of Croatia ==
Central Library of Serbs of Croatia
- Središnja knjižnica Srba u Hrvatskoj; Централна библиотека Срба у Хрватској
- Location: Zagreb, Croatia
- Established: 26 January 1996

Collection
- Items collected: Serbian literature, Croatian literature, Western literature, Marxist philosophy
- Size: 23,000 books and publications

Access and use
- Access requirements: Open to general public (for use of material outside the library membership required)

Other information
- Director: Velimir Sekulić
- Employees: 2
- Website: Централна библиотека Срба у Хрватској

The Central Library of Serbs of Croatia was established in 1996 as a central library of Serbs of Croatia (one of ten central ethnic community libraries in Croatia) financed by Ministry of Culture . Its missions include obtaining, processing, and disseminating Serbian library materials and informing the public.

=== History ===
SKD Prosvjeta began its first library activities during World War II in Yugoslavia within Yugoslav Partisans. On 4 January 1948, SKD Prosvjeta established its first central library in Zagreb. At that time the library possessed 40,000 books and publications. In 1953, library was closef made and its stock was deposited in Museum of Serbs of Croatia, National and University Library in Zagreb, and Yugoslav Academy of Sciences and Arts.

During the period of the Socialist Federal Republic of Yugoslavia there were no initiatives for special libraries for Serbs of Croatia since general libraries had an adequate number of titles from Serbian literature. In the years before, during and after the Croatian War of Independence interethnic relations in Croatia were drastically disrupted which, among other things, resulted in the mass removal and destruction of literature that conflicting sides considered inappropriate or subversive.

In 1996, on the day before Saint Sava feast day, SKD Prosvjeta re-opened library. In its initial stock the library had 6,200 books, most of those from city libraries. The initial idea of the State Office for Ethnic Minorities was to establish the central library for Serbs of Croatia in the village of Gomirje where Gomirje Monastery was located but since SKD Prosvjeta took the initiative the library was finally established in Zagreb. In the following years the library took about 15,000 Serbian literature titles from city libraries in Zagreb and Zagreb County. In this way, titles from that area were protected from recycling. Some of the titles were also sent to local subcommittees and high schools like Gymnasium Vukovar.

== Structure ==
SKD Prosvjeta has subcommittees in the following settlements in Croatia:

Locations of SKD Prosvjeta subcommittees
Locations of SKD Prosvjeta subcommittees in Eastern Slavonia not shown on first map

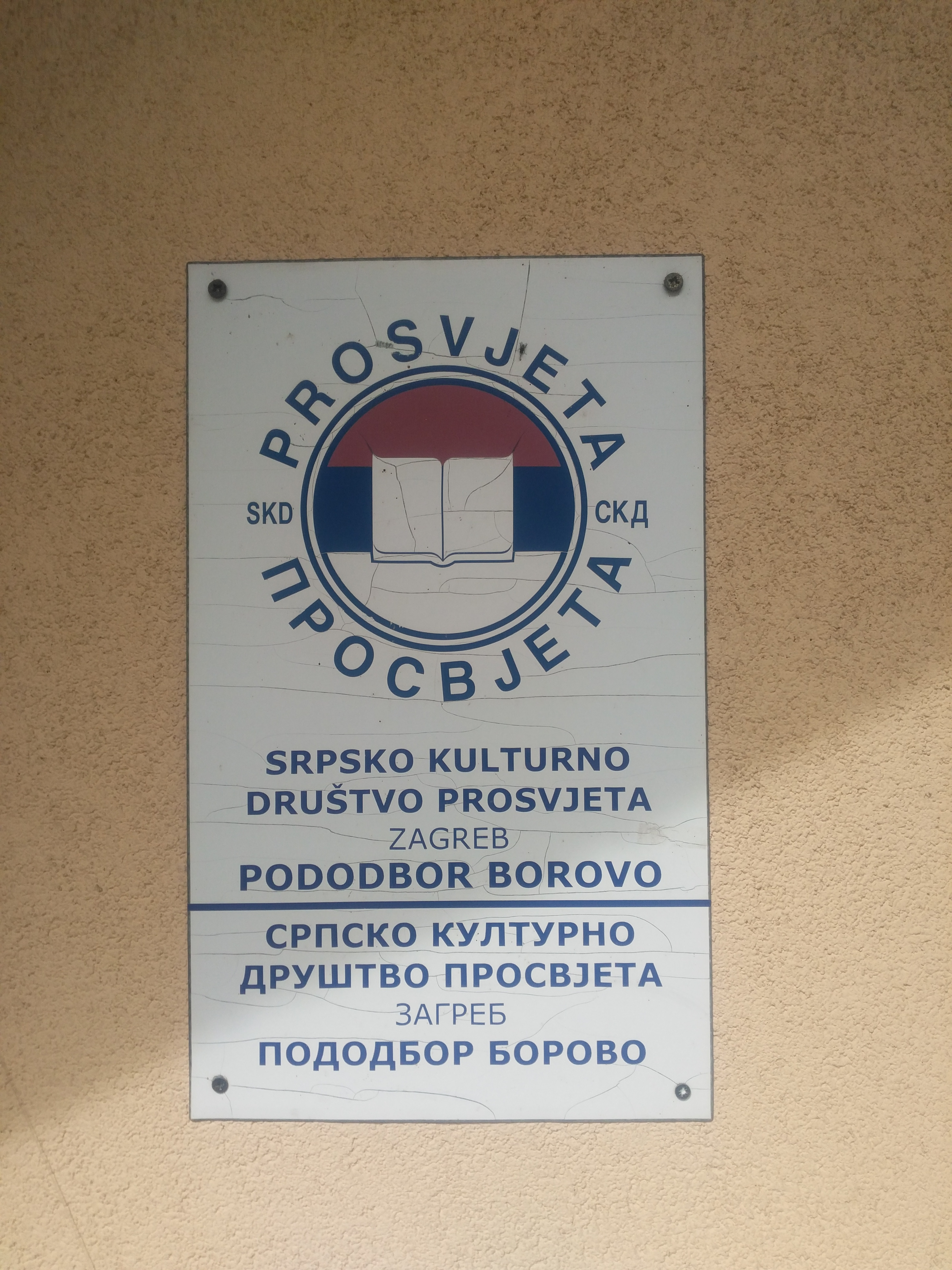
SKD Prosvjeta subcommittee in Borovo

| County | Local Subcommittees |
|---|---|
| Bjelovar-Bilogora | Daruvar; Moslavina Garešnica |
| Brod-Posavina | Okučani-Rajić |
| Istria | Bujština |
| Karlovac | Donje Dubrave; Karlovac; Krnjak; Ogulin; Vojnić |
| Lika-Senj | Korenica; Udbina; Vrhovine |
| Osijek-Baranja | Beli Manastir; Bijelo Brdo; Dalj; Darda; Jagodnjak; Kneževi Vinogradi; Osijek |
| Požega-Slavonia | Zapadna Slavonija |
| Primorje-Gorski Kotar | Gomirje; Srpske Moravice; Rijeka; Vrbovsko |
| Šibenik-Knin | Biskupija; Kistanje; Knin |
| Sisak-Moslavina | Dvor; Glina; Mali Gradac; Petrinja; Sisak; Vrginmost |
| Split-Dalmatia | Split |
| Virovitica-Podravina | Virovitica |
| Vukovar-Syrmia | Bobota; Borovo; Bršadin; Markušica; Mirkovci; Negoslavci; Ostrovo; Pačetin; Trpinja; Vera; Vukovar |
| Zagreb | Zagreb |

== Activities ==
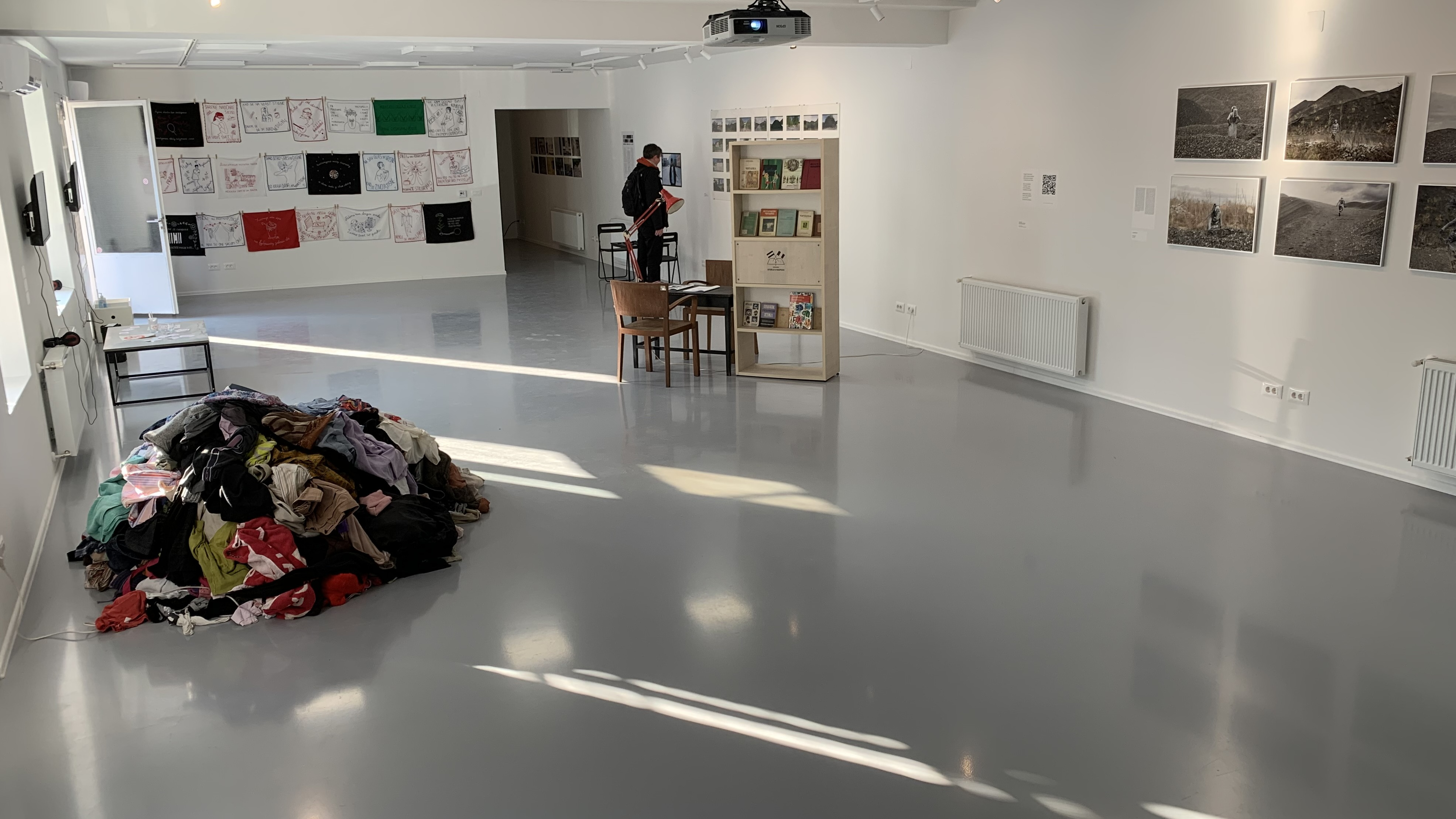
Umjetnost približavanja exhibition, 2021

Drama Studio "EHO" was founded in 2002 and today operates under the supervision of actress Svetlana Patafta.

Prosvjeta Publishing House has two bookstores in Zagreb, one of them at Petar Preradović Square.

== See also ==
- Serbs of Croatia
- Archives of Serbs in Croatia
- Days of Serbian Culture

== Sources ==
- Irvine, Jill (2007). "The Croatian Spring and the Dissolution of Yugoslavia". In Cohen, Lenard J.; Dragović-Soso, Jasna (eds.). State Collapse in South-Eastern Europe: New Perspectives on Yugoslavia's Disintegration. West Lafayette: Purdue University Press. pp. 149–178. ISBN 978-1-55753-460-6.
- Ramet, Sabrina P. (2006). The Three Yugoslavias: State-building and Legitimation, 1918–2005. Bloomington: Indiana University Press. ISBN 978-0-253-34656-8.
