= Gordana Đilas =

Serbian poet, librarian and bibliographer

- Born: Gordana Đilas; 23 December 1958 (age 67) Nakovo, Kikinda, FPR Yugoslavia
- Occupation: Writer, poet, bibliographer

Gordana Đilas (Serbian Cyrillic: Гордана Ђилас; born 23 December 1958) is a Serbian poet, librarian and bibliographer.

== Biography ==
Gordana Đilas graduated from “Dušan Vasiljev” Secondary School in Kikinda and attended the Faculty of Philosophy in Novi Sad, where she graduated in Yugoslav and World Literature in 1982. In 2011, she earned a master's degree at the Faculty of Philology in Belgrade, in Librarianship and Information Sciences. She worked on gathering material for the Srpski biografski rečnik (Serbian Biographical Dictionary) (1984). She taught Serbian Language and Literature at “Đorđe Bešlin” Secondary School, in Тitel (1985/1986), and at the School of Chemistry in Novi Sad (1986/1987), after which she worked for the Matica Srpska Publishing Company (1987/1989).

=== The Matica Srpska Library ===
She has been working at the Matica Srpska Library since 1989, in the Department for Cataloguing and Bibliographic Work, and as of 1992, she is Head of the Heritage Collection of Vojvodina. In 2007, she was appointed Deputy Head of the Department for Storage and Use of Publications, and in 2009 Head of the department. She acquired her Librarian's Professional Certificate at the Matica Srpska Library in 1989, after defending her research paper entitled “Katalog knjiga Rastka Petrovića u Biblioteci Matice srpske” (Catalog of Books by Rastko Petrović in the Matica Srpska Library). She earned the title of senior librarian in 2002 and advisor in 2005.

She has organized the following exhibitions in the Matica Srpska Library: Silvije Strahimir Kranjčević, Srpska književna zadruga, Momčilo Nastasijević, Svetozar Miletić and Matica Srpska, Glasnik Društva srpske slovenosti, Branko Radičević, Matica Srpska: 1826–2001 and Aleksandar Tišma. She is President of the Subsidiaries of the Matica Srpska Library, the University of Novi Sad and colleges in Vojvodina. Since 1999, she is an Associate Member of Мatica Srpska. She has been a member of the editorial board of the periodical Glas biblioteke, (Чачак) and the Board of the Matica Srpska Department of Lexicography since 2012. She has published a series of articles in the Matica Srpska Library Annual about significant figures in the history of the Matica Srpska Library – Jovan Radonić, Jovan Đorđević, Jovan Subotić, Borislav Mihajlović Mihiz, Jovan Jovanović Zmaj, Mileta Jakšić and Milutin Jakšić, Kamenko Subotić, Milan Savić, Aleksandar Sandić, Žarko Vasiljević, Dimitrije Kirilović, Vasa Stajić, Marko Maletin, Franjo Malin, Kosta Milutinović and Nikola Milutinović, Konstantin Peičić, Triva Militar, Jovan Bošković, Svetislav Banica, Toma Teodorović and Jovan Subota Mladenović.

She took part in creating the following accredited programs: Assisting Library Users, 2014, Bibliography, and Bibliographical Research and Compiling Personal Bibliographies, 2015. She participated in numerous library conferences and literary gatherings.

== Bibliographical work ==
She compiled and published selective bibliographies of: Matija Bećković, Momo Kapor, Borisav Stanković, Vujica Rešin Tucić, Sava Damjanov, Milan Pražić, Simon Grabovac, Vladimir Kopicl, Ivan Negrišorac, Đorđe Pisarev, Duško Vrtunski, Branko Andrić Andrla, Petko Vojnić Purčar, Raša Popov, Žarko Zolotić, Miodrag Perišić, Jasna Melvinger, Katalin Ladik, Milan Nenadić, Selimir Radulović, Trifun Dimić, Pero Zubac, Blagoje Baković, Đorđo Sladoje, Andrej Živor, Andrej Tišma, Nikola Kitanović, Olivera Radulović, Špiro Matijević, Zlata Kocić, Radovan Mićić, Marija Jovancai, Dušica Grbić, Anđelko Erdeljanin, Oto Fenjveši, Nenad Grujičić, Nedeljko Radlović, Novica Tadić, Ranko Jovović, Bratislav Milanović, Stevan Raičković, Sava Mrkalj, Petar Krdu, Dušan Radak, Žarko Komanin, Marija Šimoković, Slobodan Rakitić, Dragomir Brajković, Svetislav Jovanov, Nenad Mitrov, Stevan Pešić, Emsura Hamzić, Tomislav Z. Longinović, Ivan Čolović, Gojko Tešić, Dušan Vojvodić, Momir Vojvodić, Franja Petrinović. She is working jointly on Srpski biografski rečnik (Serbian Biographical Dictionary) and Leksikon pisaca srpske književnosti (A Lexicon of Serbian Authors). She is the assistant director for storage and use of publications at the Matica Srpska Library. She has published nine books of poetry and a book of selected poetry. Her poems have been translated into Ruthenian, Romanian and Swedish.

== Works ==
=== Poetry ===
- Pred ogledalom (Before a Mirror), Matica srpska, Novi Sad, 1985;
- Gospodine, gospodine, (Sir, Sir)Matica srpska, Novi Sad, 1989; ISBN 86-363-0124-6
- Carski vrt (Imperial Garden), Društvo književnika Vojvodine, Novi Sad, 1996;
- Zvezda juga (South Star), Svetovi, Novi Sad, 2002; ISBN 86-7047-404-2
- Usputna stanica (Way Station), Braničevo, Požarevac, 2005; ISBN 86-7315-021-3
- Učitelj sećanja (Memory Teacher), Novi Sad, 2009; ISBN 978-86-913091-0-7
- Sećanje koje se nije dogodilo(A Memory That Never Was), Novi Sad, 2011; ISBN 978-86-7188-127-2
- Druge stvari (Other Things), Zavod za kulturu Vojvodine, Novi Sad, 2012; ISBN 978-86-85083-58-7
- Bila sam poslušno drvo (I Was an Obedient Tree) (selected and new poems), Orpheus, Novi Sad, 2012; ISBN 978-86-7954-117-8
- Sever, udaljen zvuk (North, a Distant Sound), Povelja, Kraljevo, 2015; ISBN 978-86-81355-75-6

=== Essays ===
- Šest poslenika Biblioteke Matice srpske (Six Employees of the Matica Srpska Library), Matica Srpska Library, Novi Sad, 1998; ISBN 86-80061-23-9

=== Bibliographies ===
- Bibliografija INDIS 1976-2009 (with Svetlana Vučković), FTN, Novi Sad, 2010.ISBN 978-86-7892-283-1.
- Bibliografija radova akademika Mileve Prvanović, Srpska akademija nauka i umetnosti, OgranakNovi Sad, 2012. ISBN 978-86-81125-83-0.

=== Edited books ===
- Reči i vreme, a book of selected texts by Milan Pražić, Matica Srpska Library, Novi Sad, 2002.ISBN 86-80061-28-X.
- Otvoreni svet, a book of selected translations of Duško Vrtunski, Matica Srpska Library, Novi Sad, 2003.ISBN 86-80061-31-X.
- Tribina mladih: 1954–1977 (with Nedeljko Mamula), Kulturni centar Novog Sada, Novi Sad, 2004.ISBN 86-7931-012-3.
- Mapa sveta Petrovaradinske tvrđave(with B. Popržan, N. Mamulaand Đ. Pisarev), Likovni krug, Novi Sad, 2005.ISBN 86-86071-00-7.
- Kleine Bibliograpfie des Schriftenausches: a small bibliography on the exchange of publications by Georg Strien; (bibliographic materials of the exchange of publications collected by Надежда Хотеева, Любовь Катц, Thomas Mann, Gordana Đilas, Вера Прияшникова, Reference Services Department of the National Library of Poland, Adrian Shindler, Nijole Vasiliauskaite), Helsinki, 2008;
- Moja biografija, by Đorđe Lazarević (with Drago Njegovan), Novi Sad City Library, 2013. ISBN 978-86-82275-87-9.

== Awards ==
- Pečat varoši sremskokarlovačke, for the book of poems Učitelj sećanja, 2010,
- Milica Stojadinovic-Srpkinja, for the book Sećanje koje se nije dogodilo, 2011,
- Annual award of Nakovo, for outstanding contribution to cultural and educational development of Nakovo, 2014,
- Rade Drainac Award for the book Sever, udaljen zvuk, 2016.
