= Antonije Hadžić =

- Антоније Хаџић
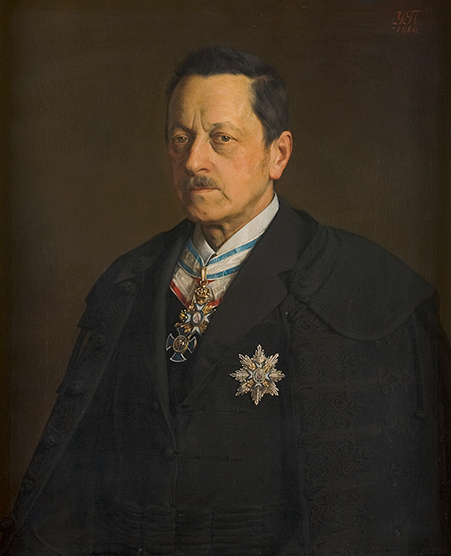
- Portrait of Hadžić by Uroš Predić, 1900
- Born: 20 November 1831; Subotica, Austrian Empire
- Died: 17 January 1916 (aged 84); Novi Sad, Austria-Hungary
- Occupations: Playwright, stage director, editor
- Awards: Order of St. Sava; Order of Prince Danilo I Order of Franz Joseph

Antonije Tona Hadžić (Serbian Cyrillic: Антоније Хаџић; 20 November 1831 – 17 January 1916) was the secretary and president of the Matica Srpska, playwright, and director of the Serbian National Theater and editor-in-chief of the Letopis (Chronicle) of the Matica Srpska.

== Biography ==
Antonije was born on 20 November 1831 in Subotica, to father Sava and mother Marija.

In Subotica, he attended elementary school (1840–1843) and six grades of high school (1843–1850). He then completed the remaining two years of high school in Pest. In the same city, he studied philosophy (1850–1852) and law (1852–1857). As a pupil and student, he played in the Serbian amateur theater and was also the president of the Serbian youth association Peodnica in Pest.

== Matica Srpska ==
At the General Assembly on 22 August 1859 in Pest, he was elected secretary of the Matica Srpska. One of the first tasks in office was to realize the initiative of the former president of the Matica, Platon Atanacković, to move the Matica from Pest to Novi Sad, which he did in 1864 together with [Candić. He remained secretary until 1895 when he served as president (1896–1911). . As the editor of the Letopis (Chronicle) of Matica Srpska (1859–1869 and 1876–1895), he was extremely agile, and his editorial policy reflected the maturing of the political consciousness of the young towards the democratic and freedom-loving ideals of European citizenship. He also published Matica's magazine for literature and entertainment Matica three times a month, from 1865 to 1870.

== Serbian National Theater ==
While he was with Matica in Pest, together with Laza Kostić, he organized plays for the benefit of the Serbian National Theater. He also obtained statutes that could serve as a model for the first constitution for the Srpsko Narodno Pozorište (SNP), he collected decor, costumes, props, as well as plays for translation for the first repertoire, and he also personally translated and prepared some of them. When he moved to Novi Sad, he completely dedicated himself to the theater: he was the deputy's head, then the head of the Association for the Srpsko Narodno Pozorište (SNP), the president of the Theater Department, the manager, the playwright, and the director. From 1875 to 1903, he was represented as manager by Dimitrije Ružić, but Hadžić still managed the theater.

Hadzic wrote literary and theater reviews, portraits of actors, short stories, historical articles, and minor discussions, translated plays from the Hungarian language, adapted domestic plays (Grabancijas by Ilija Okrugić Sremac and Stanoje Glavaš by Djura Jakšić) for the theater, staged the Mountain Wreath by Njegoš with a prologue by Laza Kostić (1902). With Gligorije Geršić, Antonije Hadžić translated Othello (1886) and independently translated the third act of King Lear (1873). He wrote a one-act comedy Love is not a joke (1871) and with Jovan Djordjević an allegory in two parts with music by Davorin Jenko's Markov Saber (1873). He initiated and edited the Theater (1871—1908) and the edition Zbornik pozorišnih dela of the Srpsko Narodno Pozorište (Serbian national Theatre) in 1872.

He was an activist of the United Serbian Youth and the editor-in-chief of its newspaper Mlada Srbadija (1870–1871) until he was transferred to Belgrade.

Hadžić and poet Jovan Jovanović Zmaj often corresponded with one another. In a letter to Hadžić, Zmaj referred to the great men of letters of both Hungary (Vorosmarty, Petofi, Arany) and Serbia (Branko, Njegoš, Sarajlija and speculated how well they must be fraternizing in the celestial world before the Almighty.

Antonije Hadžić was awarded the Order of Saint Sava I class, II class (1894) and III class (1898); the Order of Prince Danilo I, III degree (1895); the Cross of Franz Joseph I (1908), and he also received the title of court advisor.

He was buried in the Almaški cemetery in Novi Sad.

A street in Novi Sad bears his name.

== See also ==
- Matica Srpska
- Mihailo Polit-Desančić
- Milan Savić (author)
- Jovan Jovanović Zmaj

== Sources ==
- Glasnik Istorijskog drustva u Novi Sadu, Novi Sad, 1931;
- Matica srpska 1826–1926, Matica Srpska, 1927. p. 534;
- "Biography of Antonio Hadžić" on the website of the Encyclopedia of the Serbian National Theater". www.snp.org.rs. Retrieved 8 August 2018;
- "Antonije Hadžić, secretary of Matica Srpska" – In: Školski list, 15 May 1889;
- "Encyclopedia of Novi Sad." Book 30, Fog-Schush. Novi Sad: Novi Sad Club "Good News". 2009. p. 107—109;
- Acović, Dragomir (2012). "Glory and honor: Decorations among Serbs, Serbs among decorations". Belgrade: Official Gazette. p. 561;
- "Thirty tombstones with graves of prominent political, cultural and public workers", at the Almaški cemetery in Novi Sad." www.spomenicikulture.mi.sanu.ac.rs.

== Literature ==
- "Encyclopedia of Novi Sad". Book 30, Fog-Schush. Novi Sad: Novi Sad Club "Good News". 2009. p. 107—109.
