= Đilas =

Đilas or, old orthography Djilas (Serbian: Ђилас) is a Serbian surname.

Đilas is also a Serb clan originating in Montenegro from the Vojinović noble family.

== People ==
- Dragan Đilas (born 1967), Serbian politician and former mayor of Belgrade
- Gordana Đilas (born 1958), Serbian poet, librarian and bibliographer
- Milovan Đilas (1911–1995), Yugoslav politician and author
- Vladimir Đilas (born 1983), Serbian footballer
