= Georgije Magarašević =

Serbian writer (1793–1830)

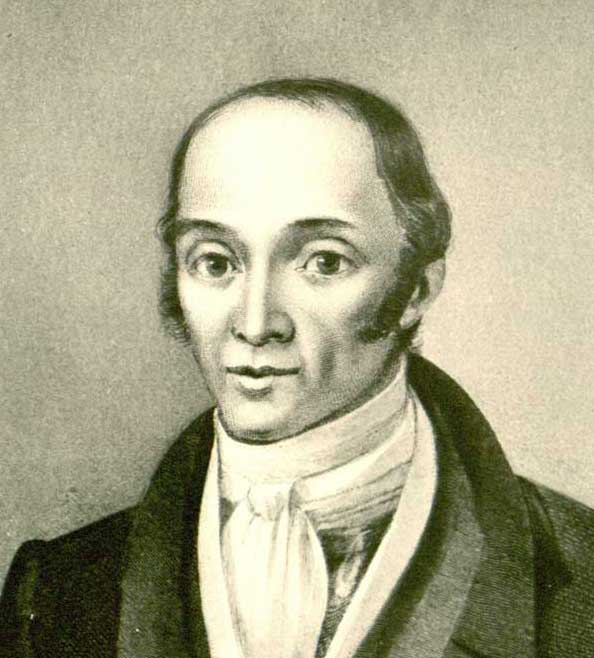
Illustration of Magarašević, published in Знаменити Срби 19. века (1901)

Georgije Magarašević (10 September 1793 in Adaševci – 6 January 1830 in Novi Sad), was a writer, historian, bibliographer, editor and publisher, dramatist, translator and collector of folk proverbs from the Austrian Empire. He was ethnically Serbian. He belongs to the same generation of Serbian writers as Dimitrije Davidović, Teodor Pavlović, Danilo Medaković, all of whom expressed in some degree their indebtedness to Dositej Obradović and Vuk Karadžić.

== Biography ==
He was born on 10 September 1793 in the Serbian village of Adaševci in Srem, in what was once the Serbian Military Frontier and today is Vojvodina, Serbia. He was educated in the Gymnasium and Theological College of Sremski Karlovci. He went to the University of Pest to study philosophy and natural sciences. In 1813, he became a professor at Sremski Karlovci's Theological College and in 1817 professor of history, literature, and philosophy at Novosadska Gimnazija (the Gymnasium of Novi Sad).

== Literary critic ==
In 1822, he published his first work under the title Nove istroičeske pamtivostonosti života Napoleona Bonaparta. He was the first to tackle the question of literary history in a more consistent manner than local authors before him. In his three letters about Serbian literature published in the "Serbski letopis" ("Serbian Annals"), Magarašević made a distinction between universal literary history, literary history of a certain epoch, and national literary history of the "fatherland".

Magarašević participated in the debate between the proponents of the vernacular and those of the Slavonic-Serbian language, and he considered Dositej Obradović the first modern Serbian writer, though he also accepted some of Vuk Karadžić's ideas on the vernacular language "revolution".

According to Magarašević, national literature could not be written in a dead or artificial language, only in a living everyday one, because literature was the mirror of a nation, its culture, its literacy, and its character. Imitating old literary models could be rewarding and illuminating but could not match the original because it lacked a national context, language, and subject.

== Founder of Serbski letopis ==
Magarašević was the man with the idea which ignited others founder of Matica Srpska to make it happen. In fact, he received much encouragement from Lukijan Mušicki and Pavel Jozef Šafárik, the director of the Gymnasium at Novi Sad, where Magarašević was professor.

Matica srpska began operating in 1824 when the Austrian authorities permitted Magarašević to publish a literary and scholarly journal entitled Serbski letopis (Serbian Annals). Magarašević had little financial backing but soon found benefactors who supported his efforts, and in time somehow the writers and editors of the publication developed into a learned society. The society successfully overcame the pressures applied by mistrustful Austrian officials as well as later financial difficulties.

Magarašević was the first to tackle the question of literary history in a more consistent way than anyone else before. In his three editorials about Serbian literature published in the Serbski letopis, Magarašević made a distinction between universal literary history, literary history of a certain epoch, and national literary history of the "fatherland."

== Death ==
Georgije Magarašević died of consumption at Novi Sad on 6 January 1830. He was 35 years old.

== Works ==
Magarašević's earlier works include:

- "Nove istroiceske pamtivostonosti zivota Napoleona Bonaparta"(Buda, 1822);
- "Istorija najvazniu politićni evropeiski priklocenij ot Vienskog mira 1809 do 1821 godine" (Vienna, 1823);
- "Kratka vsemirna istorija" (Buda, 1831); "Putovanje po Srbiji" (1827);
- "Duh spisanija Dositejevi" (1830); "Dositejeva pisma" (1829); and
- "Iz arhipastorskog rada mitropolita Pavla Nenadovića", in Brankovo kolo, XXXV, reprinted in 1903.

== Sources ==
- Translated and adapted from Jovan Skerlić's Istorija nove srpske književnosti (Belgrade, 1914, 1921), pages 153-155
