= Zmaj Children Games =

Festival in Serbia

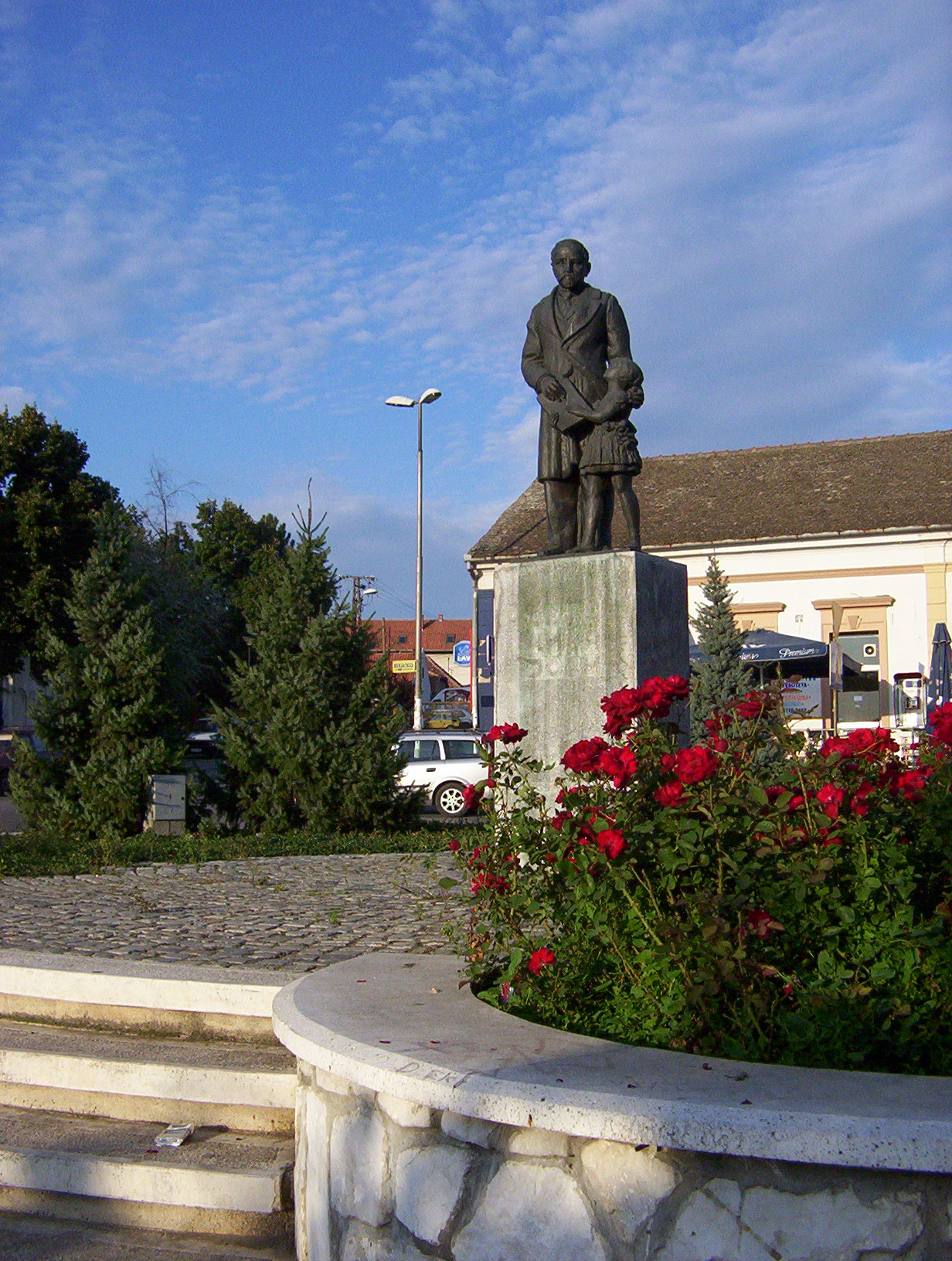
Statue of Jovan Jovanović Zmaj in centre of Sremska Kamenica

Zmaj Children Games (Serbian: Змајеве дечије игре / Zmajeve dečije igre) is one of the biggest festivals for children in Serbia and the Novi Sad region. Named after Jovan Jovanović Zmaj, one of the most famous Serbian poets and writers of children's literature, the festival is held annually in June and December in Novi Sad, the capital of the Serbian province of Vojvodina.

The first festival was held in June 1958 under the name "Festival of literature for children, drama and puppet theatre" ("Фестивал дечије поезије, драме и луткарског позоришта"). Its organizer is Matica Srpska in Novi Sad. In 1969, the name was changed to Zmaj Children Games.

The main idea behind the festival is to gather writers, illustrators, critics, publishers, editors and readers of children's literature from Serbia and beyond. The Zmaj Children Games have their own publishing in the form of the magazine "Детињство" (Childhood) and hold a gathering of well respected children's literature authors in Zmaj Jovina Street 26.

Every June for a few days, children's plays, concerts, and shows gather children from Novi Sad and its surrounding region in Zmaj Jovina Street (the main street in Novi Sad's city centre).

== See also ==
- Sremska Kamenica, Novi Sad neighborhood, home to the Zmaj museum in the home of Jovan Jovanović Zmaj.
