= Vasa Stajić =

Serbian writer and philosopher (1878–1947)

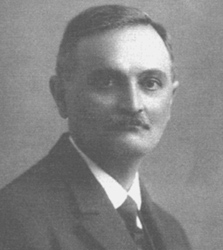
Vasa Stajić, writer and philosopher

Vasa Stajić (10 February 1878 – 10 February 1947) was a Serbian writer and philosopher. He was born in Mokrin in 1878, and died in Novi Sad in 1947 where he spent most of his life. He was secretary of the Serbian Cultural Society from 1920 to 1922 and its president twice (1935–36 and 1947). A statue of him appears in front of the Serbian Cultural Society.

Stajić wrote several biographies of famous people and families. He was one of the most important figures of modern cultural and political Vojvodina.

== Early life ==
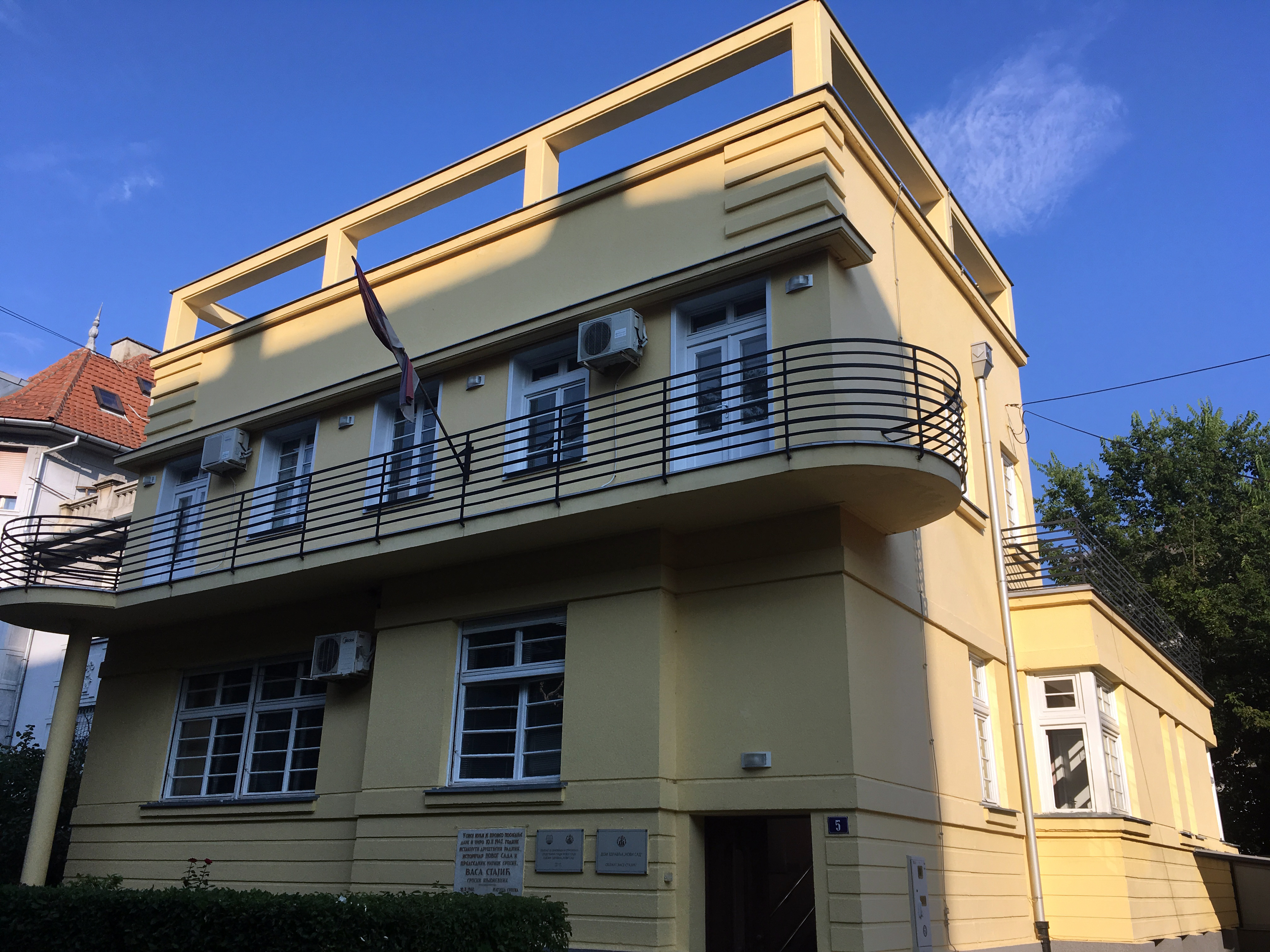
Stajić's house in Novi Sad

Stajić was born in Mokrin. He went to high school in Kikinda, Sremski Karlovci and Senj. As a student he was expelled from the Karlovci Gymnasium. He studied law, then philosophy in Budapest, Paris and Leipzig. He graduated in 1902 in Budapest. In 1904 and 1905, he taught at Pakrac and at Pljevlja gymnasium, where he had a colleague, professor and historian Gligorije Elezović.

Vasa Stajić published a socialist journal called Novi Srbin and Prosveta magazine and, because of his ideas, he was frequently arrested and questioned by the authorities. In Novi Sad, he became secretary of the Matica srpska, one of the most important Serbian cultural institutions of the Kingdom of Serbs, Croats and Slovenes and of the Kingdom of Yugoslavia, and in 1921 and 1936 he was editor of "Letopis" (Chronicle), the official organ of this institution.

He has written more than twenty books, including Novosadske biografije (Biographies of Novi Sad) in six volumes and Velikokikindski dištrikt (The District of Velika Kikinda). He also published studies on Svetozar Miletić (1926) and Jovan Jovanović Zmaj (1933) as well as more than 100 scholarly articles. After World War II, he was president of Matica srpska, a position he held until his death. There are schools in Mokrin and Novi Sad named after him.

Cultural offices
| Preceded by Radivoje Vrhovac | President of Matica Srpska; 1935–1936 | Succeeded by Aleksandar Moč |
| Preceded by ? | President of Matica Srpska; 1945–1947 | Succeeded by ? |
