= Jovan Bošković =

Serbian philologist and politician (1834–1893)

Jovan Bošković (Serbian Cyrillic: Јован Бошковић; 19 February 1834 – 7 January 1893) was a Serbian professor, philologist, librarian, and politician.

== Biography ==
Bošković was born in Novi Sad to his father Stevan, a bootmaker originally from Veliki Bečkerek, and his mother Marija. He allegedly comes from the family line of the famous general Simeon Zorić, a Serb in the service of Imperial Russia during the rule of Empress Catherine the Great.

He graduated from the Novi Sad Gymnasium in 1850, and continued his university education in the north of Hungary (today's Slovakia), in Modra (1850/51) and Požun, where he graduated in 1852 with a bachelor's degree. During the Slovak years, he met and befriended Martin Hattala, Ján Kalinčiak and Ľudovít Štúr, whose work he translated into Serbian. He studied law in Vienna. He spoke several languages: Slovak, Czech, Hungarian, German, Ancient Greek and Modern Greek. In addition to studying law, he also attended lectures on Slavic philology by the famous professor Franc Miklošič together with Đuro Daničić. In Vienna, he was also an associate of Vuk Karadžić, whose enthusiastic supporters he would become.

== Career ==
After returning to Novi Sad, he worked for a while as a clerk in the law office of Jovan Subotić, and in 1859 he moved to Serbia. In Belgrade, he first worked as a private teacher for children from respectable homes, and in 1861 he was appointed professor of the Savamal lower grammar school. The following year, he worked as a professor at the high school in Kragujevac and the high school in Belgrade. His Excerpt from Serbian Grammar (1863) was published several times and was a textbook in high schools until the grammar of Stojan Novaković.

When Đura Daničić left the Velika škola in 1865, Bošković came to his place, where he taught subjects in Slavic philology. He remained in this position until 1871, when he was fired after defending the autonomy of the Velika škola. He then returned to Novi Sad, where he was the chief school supervisor of Novi Sad's Serbian school board, a librarian and the assistant secretary of Matica Srpska. For some time he edited the Zastava and the organ Letopis (Chronicle) of the Matica Srpska.

In 1875, he went to Serbia again, and was invited to take over the position of librarian of the National Library of Serbia and curator of the National Museum of Serbia. He remained in these positions until 1880, when he was re-elected professor of Slavic philology at the Velika škola. From 1883 to 1891 he was the secretary of the Serbian Academic Society (Srpsko učeno društvo). As the Court was merged with the Serbian Royal Academy, Bošković became a member. He was awarded the Order of Saint Sava for his many accomplishments.

== Politician ==
During his stay in Novi Sad, he was twice elected a member of the National-Church Assembly in Sremski Karlovci (1872 and 1874) on the list of the Serbian People's Liberal Party. In the Principality of Serbia, he was twice a member of the National Assembly, a member of the school commission, the main educational council and the Constituent Board. When the government of Jovan Avakumović was formed in 1892, Bošković became the Minister of Education and Church Affairs.

== Writer ==
He was a well-known fighter for the correctness of language and the use of the vernacular in literature. His grammar marked the practical victory of Vuk's principles. He has written a large number of articles on language, theater reviews, and obituaries. He was also engaged in translation work, publishing books by older writers and bibliography. He published Poems by Branko Radičević (Pančevo, 1879) and Ivan Gundulić's Osman (Zemun, 1889) with a preface and comments. Towards the end of his life, he began collecting writings on the purity of language and style, but out of the planned eight, he published only two volumes on the Serbian Language.

== Cultural activity ==
He was one of the founders of the National Theater in Belgrade, a member and later vice-president of the theater board, and during the Serbian-Turkish wars of 1876-1878. years and interim administrator. From 1871 to 1875 he was a member of the Board of Directors of the Serbian National Theater in Novi Sad. He was one of the founding members and a member of the first Board of the Serbian Archaeological Society in 1883. Bošković was in 1868-1869. at the head of the Belgrade Singing Society ".

He died suddenly of a heart attack in Belgrade in 1893. He was buried at state expense as a distinguished citizen of Serbia.

== Bibliography ==
- Translation of Ľudovít Štúr book about Narodnim pesmama i pripovetkama slovenskim (1857)
- Excerpt from Serbian Grammar 1 (Novi Sad, 1863)
- Excerpt from Serbian Grammar 2, Serbian Syntax (Belgrade, 1864)
- Documents on the riots at the Great School (Belgrade, 1871)
- The Science of Language and Its Task (Belgrade, 1871)
- On the Serbian language 1-2 (Belgrade, 1887-1888)
- O narodnosti i o negovanju srpske narodnosti nastavom i vaspitanjem (Beograd, 1887)
- Vuk Stefanović Karadžić (Belgrade, 1888)
- Review of the contents of the 90 books of the Gazette of the Serbian Academic Society: 1841-1847-1891: by writers, by profession and chronologically (Belgrade, 1891)
- Letters on Serbian and Croatian Literature (Belgrade, 1892)
- Jovan Ristic (Belgrade, 1898)
