= Stevan Branovački =

Serbian politician and lawyer

Stevan Branovački

Stevan Branovački (13 June 1804 – 8 February 1880) was a Serbian lawyer, politician, mayor of Novi Sad, president of Matica Srpska and one of the founders of the Serbian National Theater.

== Biography ==
A descendant of the Branovački family from Senta, he was born on 13 June 1804 in Senta, where he finished primary school, as well as the first grade of high school, with a private Hungarian tutor. He finished the second grade of high school in Subotica, and completed his secondary education in Baja and Szeged, where he also studied philosophy, and law in Požun. After graduating in 1826, he served in the Bačka district in Stari Bečej, then in 1828 at the Royal Table in Budapest, where he passed the bar exam with excellent results. After that, he opened a law office in Senta.

Between 1842 and 1848, Branovački was a deputy senator in the magistracy of the Potisk district. In 1848, he was elected the district chief of the Solgabir family, which was the first choice in Bačka County for this title from the ranks of people who were not nobles. He spent the year 1849 in Zemun and Belgrade, and in 1850 he became the district commissioner, and then the last captain at the Serbian repression district in Bačka. After the cessation of the existence of this district in 1857, he became a district judge in Novi Sad.

In 1851, he came to Novi Sad, where he worked as a lawyer, judge, and Member of Parliament.

In 1861, he was elected a member of the Hungarian Parliament, and also in 1865, and on that occasion, he was elected to the first Hungarian delegation, and in 1869 he was elected mayor of Novi Sad. He did a lot for the urban development of the city. In 1872 and 1875, he was a member of the Serbian National Church and People's Assembly in Sremski Karlovci. At the assembly in 1875, under his presidency, the patriarch was elected. He was one of the founders of the Serbian National Theater, a participant in the founding of the Society for the Serbian National Theater (1861), and the first president of that society (1861-1868).

He was the president of the Serbian church community in Novi Sad (1868-1872) and one of the patrons of the high school. For several years, beginning in 1868, he was president of the First Commercial and Craft Bank.

He was first elected in 1867, and from 1872 until the end of his life he was the president of the permanent Matica Srpska, the oldest Serbian literary, cultural, and scientific institution. In Novi Sad, he lived in Lebarska Street (today it is called Svetozar Miletić Street No. 8).

He was not inclined to write — only a few parliamentary speeches and interpellations remained from him, which is why he was called the Serbian Cato.

The tombstone of Stevan Branovoački, at the Uspek Cemetery in Novi Sad, is a protected cultural monument, registered in 1968.

== Notes ==
He was born on June 1 according to the Julian calendar.
