= Teodor Pavlović =

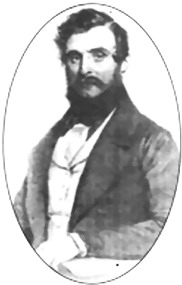
Teodor Pavlović

Teodor Pavlović (24 February 1804 – 12 August 1854) was a Serb writer, publicist, translator and editor who lived in the Austrian Empire. Pavlović was the founder of the Gallery of Matica Srpska, and the editor of the oldest literary monthly in Europe Annals of Matica Srpska.

== Biography ==
Teodor Pavlović, son of Paul Pavlović and Jelisaveta Matić, was born on 14 February 1804 in a small village called Dragutinovo, now known as Karlovo, in today's municipality of Novo Miloševo in Banat, Vojvodina. Upon completing grammar school, his father sent him to the best high schools in the region, first to Hatzfeld in former Torontal county, then Temisvar, Velika Kikinda, Sremski Karlovci and finally in Segedin. When he graduated in Segedin he was fluent in Latin, Church Slavonic, German, Hungarian, and Romanian. At the suggestion of a friend, Konstantin Peičić, he then went to Pozun (Bratislava) where he studied law and liberal arts, graduating in 1827 with a law degree.

Pavlović was more devoted to the cause of Serbian cultural development than to his own law practice. He was named editor-in-chief of Letopis (the official chronicle of Matica srpska) in 1832, a post he held until 1841.

He established the Serbski Narodni List, a Serbian political newspaper, inaugurated on 1 June 1835 in Buda (now Budapest). Later, the name of the paper was changed to Serbske Narodne Novine which continued publishing with minor interruptions until 1849. Pavlović became the first secretary of Matica Srpska in 1837. Thanks to the efforts of Pavlović, his friends Sava Tekelija, Jovan Nako, Baron Fedor Nikolić of Rudna, Petar Carnojević, Vladika Platon Atanacković, Prince Mihailo Obrenović, Metropolitan Stefan Stanković, Bishop Evgenije Jovanović, Aleksa Simić, and others, joined the institution and helped establish it.

Pavlović died in Sremski Karlovci.

== Works ==
He translated from the German of Adolph Freiherr Knigge's "Uber den Umgang mit Menschen" (On Human Relations) into Serbian (Buda, 1831) and two works by Christoph Martin Wieland (1733–1813) entitled "Sympathien" (Sympathies) and "Dialogen des Diogenes von Sinope" also into Serbian, published in Buda, 1829).

In his original writings he gives portraits of his contemporaries; and he chronicled in his articles the many political scandals of which Vienna and Budapest were centers. They are invaluable for their social, political and literary history of the time.

Literary critic Jovan Skerlić wrote: "He was in the 1840s what Svetozar Miletić was in the 1860s and 1870s."

== Sources ==
- From Serbian Wikipedia: http://sr.wikipedia.org/sr-el/%D0%A2%D0%B5%D0%BE%D0%B4%D0%BE%D1%80_%D0%9F%D0%B0%D0%B2%D0%BB%D0%BE%D0%B2%D0%B8%D1%9B
- Jovan Skerlić, Istorija nove srpske književnosti (Belgrade, 1914, 1921) pages 152 and 153.
