= Mihailo Polit-Desančić =

Serbian politician and writer

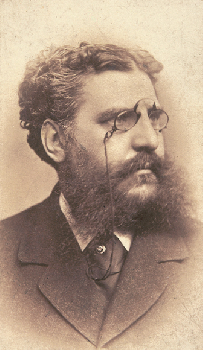
- Born: April 16, 1833; Novi Sad
- Died: March 30, 1920 (aged 86); Timișoara

Mihailo Polit-Desančić (Serbian Cyrillic: Михаило Полит-Десанчић; 16 April 1833 – 30 March 1920) was a Serbian politician, journalist and writer. He was a member of the Serbian Learned Society (Srpsko učeno društvo) and the Serbian Royal Academy (Srpska kraljevska akademija), predecessors of the current Serbian Academy of Sciences and Arts.

== Biography ==
Mihailo Polit-Desančić was born in Novi Sad, and was an Aromanian or had mixed Aromanian–Serb origins. In Vienna, he received a degree in jurisprudence and obtained another degree in Paris in political science.

A polyglot and scholar, he became a close collaborator of Svetozar Miletić and, with him, one of the most important political figures of the Serbs of Vojvodina of the time, integrated in the possessions of the House of Austria. He then published the periodical Branik, from 1890 the organ of the Serbian Liberal Party in Hungary. He was a member of the parliaments of Croatia and Hungary and a member of Sremski Karlovci's Ecclesiastical and School Council (Crkveno-školski sabor).

After the dissolution of Svetozar Miletić's party, he was a member of the Radical Popular Party (Narodna radikalna stranka) and a member of the People's Liberal Party (Narodna liberalna stranka) and the leader of the liberals of Vojvodina.

He died in Timișoara, and is buried in the Dormition Cemetery in Novi Sad, where his funerary monument is part of a set of 24 tombs of historical, cultural and other personalities inscribed on the list of protected cultural monuments (ID No. SK 1588) of the Republic of Serbia.

== Works ==
Among his works are Verenica Crnogorka (The Montenegrin Bride, 1863), the historical drama Branivoj knez Zahumski (Prince Branivoj of Zahumlje, 1868), the travelogue Putne uspomene (Travels Souvenirs), books of memories like Kako sam svoj vek proveo (How I passed through my century), Uspomene iz 1848–1849 (Memories of 1848–1849), Pokojnici (The Deceased) and four books entitled Besede (Words).
