= Jovan Subotić =

Serbian lawyer, writer, politician and academic

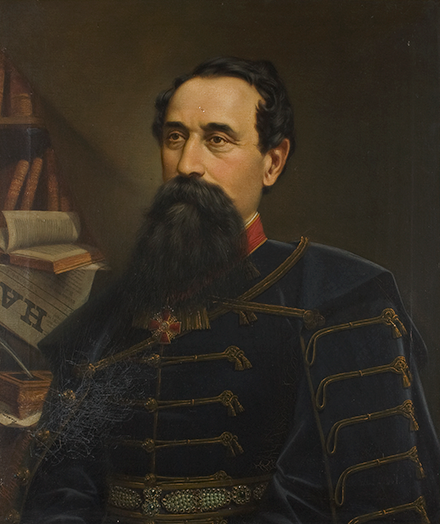

Member of the Diet of the Kingdom of Croatia and Slavonia
- In office 1865–1867

Personal details
- Born: 30 January 1817 Dobrinci, Austrian Empire
- Died: 16 January 1886 (aged 68) Zemun, Austro-Hungarian Empire
- Occupation: lawyer, writer and politician
- Awards: Order of Saint Anna

Jovan Subotić (30 January 1817 – 16 January 1886) was a Serbian lawyer, writer, politician and academic. An ardent Serbian and pan-Slavic patriot, Subotić was a delegate to the first Slavic Congress of 1848 and was a prominent Serb representative in the Habsburg monarchy.

== Biography ==
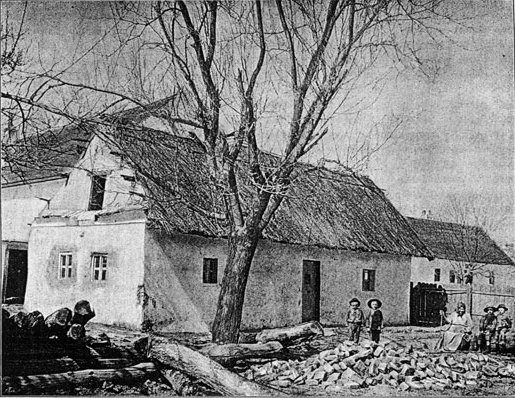
Birth house of Jovan Subotic in Dobrinci

Jovan Subotić was born in the village of Dobrinci in Srem on 30 January 1817. After completing his high school (gymnasium) education in Sremski Karlovci and Segedin, he proceeded in 1833 to the University of Pest. He was among the most popular students of his time and served as president of the Serbian Students' Union. Before going to the university he had published some verses, and while still at the university put forth a book of collected poems under the title of Lira in 1837, and in 1843 another volume of poems entitled Bosilj. In 1840 he left the University of Pest with two doctorate degrees, one in philosophy (1836) and another in jurisprudence (1840). He then settled in Pest where he opened a law practice; and began contributing regularly to Srbski Narodni list.

The Serbski letopis, later renamed Letopis Matice srpske (Annals of the Matica Srpska) was by then well established as a quarterly and, because it had only two editors during this period, was much more stable. Teodor Pavlović remained as editor until he became ill in 1842. He was succeeded by Subotić for the period 1842–1853. Letopis improved considerably under Subotić's leadership.

Also, Subotić took additional duties as state censor for Serbian and Romanian publications; and got heavily involved in politics. The private collection of Sava Tekelija's 4,000 books was moved from Arad to Budapest on 30 March 1843, the Library of Matica Srpska became the largest Serbian library outside of Serbia. Subotić directed the Library from 1842 and 1843, and in 1842 he began publishing the first Serbian current bibliography in "Letopis." He prepared this bibliography with the idea that the Library should be the book center for Serbs living in Hungarian-occupied Serbian territory.

Subotić was a member of the Serbian Royal Academy of Sciences and Serbian Learned Society.

He was married to Savka Subotić (1834–1918), a progressive proponent of women's education, and a founding member of several Serbian women's organizations. They had seven children: Dejan, Žarko, Vid, Verica, Vojislav, Branislav, and Ozren. Žarko and Vida, died as children; Vojislav became a famous doctor in Serbia, and Dejan (Dean) went to study in Imperial Russia and became a lieutenant general and governor-general in the Russian Far East.

== Patriot ==
Subotić was an ardent Serbian patriot, and during the 1848 Revolution he distinguished himself by his steady resistance to Hungarian pretensions on territories populated by Serbs. He was actively involved in the 1848 Serbian National Movement as a Budapest delegate, representing the Serbian nation in the Austrian Empire, and then as a member of the Serbian Central Committee in Karlovci. He left in his autobiography a vivid recollection of the historic first Slav congress uniting representatives from many Slav countries, then under the Austrian yoke. In 1848 he was sent as a delegate to attend the Prague Slavic Congress, 1848, a culmination of the initial phase of Pan-Slav cultural collaboration in the Habsburg Empire. The Council of the Serbs in Pest selected their delegates for Prague including Archimandrite Nikanor Grujić, a renowned orator, Archpriest Pavle Stamatović, who led that delegation, Djordje Stojković, and Jovan Subotić. The delegates from Serbia included the dean of Serbian thought, Vuk Karadžić, and the philologist Djura Daničić, Karadžić's ardent supporter. Subotić acted as the secretary.

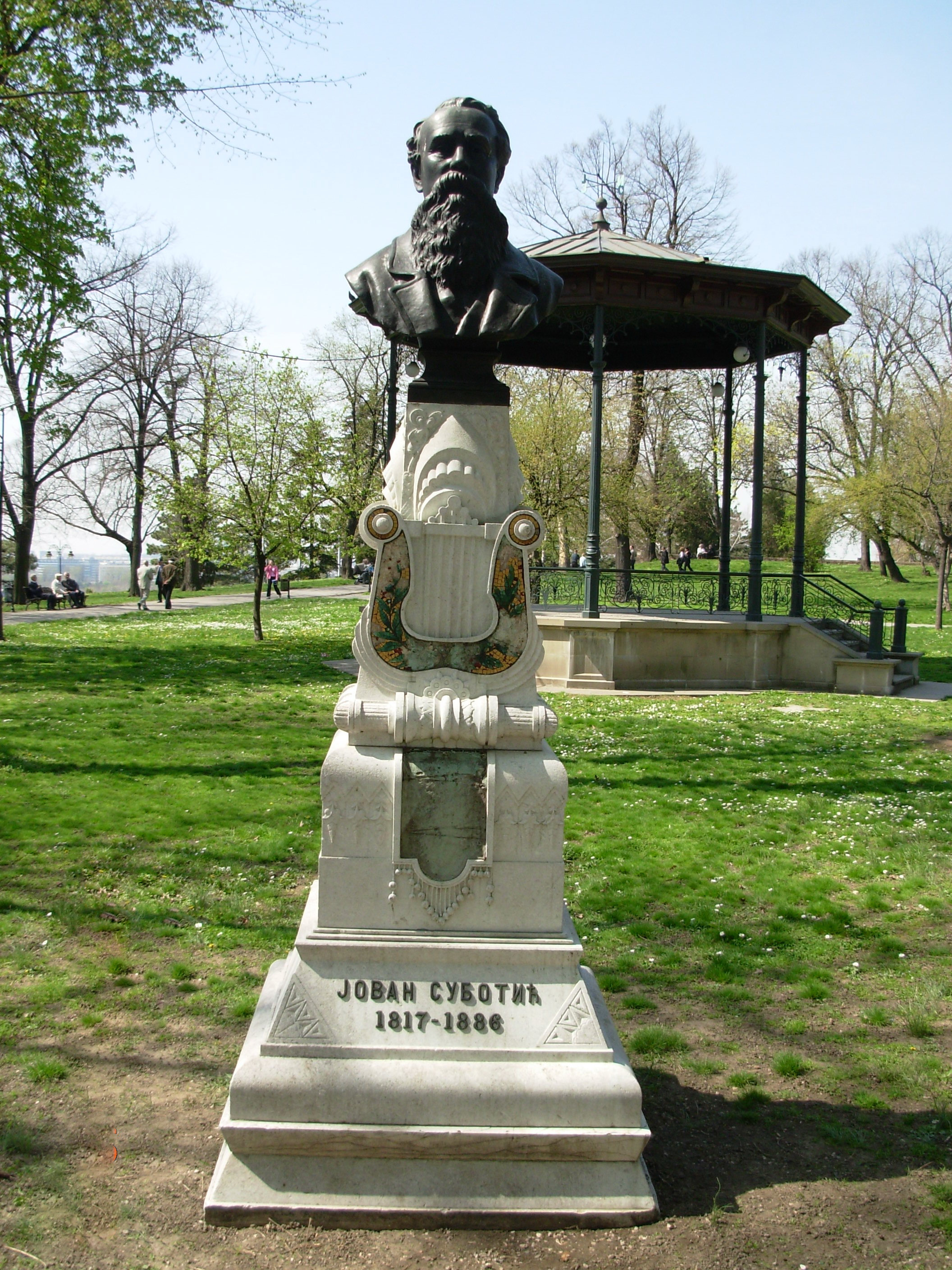
A monument to Jovan Subotić in Belgrade

According to several testimonies, Prague had a festive appearance due to the efforts of all its citizens. Banners were everywhere and all the houses were decorated. Jovan Subotić, a statesman and a member of the Serbian delegation gave his own account of this event. In his writings he commented on the disruption of the Congress in the aftermath of Vidovdan (Saint Vitus Day). The congress itself is not described in much detail, but Subotić includes some interesting recollections and evaluations of the historic meeting by Serbian delegates, and by the indomitable Mikhail Bakunin which illuminate more clearly the central theme of his book. According to Subotić's recollections, the celebration in the street of Prague were monitored and declared unruly by the Austrian authorities.

"We conferred and worked until the Orthodox All Saints Day. On this very day, the Slavic Liturgy was celebrated at St. Wenceslaus Square. Archpriest Pavle Stamatović and Archimandrite Nikanor Grujić were officiating....As soon as they (Austrian authorities) realized that the Congress turned against their plans, they became furious....and aimed to disband our Congress and arranged the bombing of Prague by General Alfred I, Prince of Windisch-Grätz...."

In his memoirs, Jovan Subotić recalled that the fateful events of 1848 propelled him irrevocably into the public life. He remembered the revolution in Vienna on March 13, which was soon followed by the revolution in Budapest on the 15th of the same month. The first demand addressed to the Parliament in Pest was the request for abolition of censorship. Subotić was among the petitioners and he subsequently lost the job that gave him 600 florins yearly.

His zeal for the national cause led him, in 1848 and 1849, to issue several news releases, articles and pamphlets, to which many of the foremost publicists in Serbia and Montenegro contributed, including Ilarion Ruvarac and Petar II Petrović Njegoš. For some time the Hungarians made it impossible for him to live in Hungarian-controlled Serbian territory, and when, in 1849, he returned to the Hungarian capital he found that his law practice had greatly diminished.

Later, he moved to Novi Sad. In 1861, he was chosen to become a deputy župan of the Syrmia County in the Kingdom of Croatia. During his time in Croatia, in 1862 he became a member of the Appeals Court in Zagreb. In 1865 he was appointed representative to the Zagreb Sabor where he played an important political role. He was elected to the Sabor and served from 1865 to 1867.

In 1867 Subotić attended the First All-Russian Ethnographic Exhibition and the Pan-Slavic Congress in Moscow, and as a result of it, he lost his government post.

He served as President of Matica srpska from 1868 to 1872.

From 1870 to 1872 he was the editor of a political journal called Srpski Narod (The Serbian Public) in Novi Sad. In 1873 he opened a law practice in Osijek, where he lived until 1884. He then moved to Zemun. He was also elected as a representative for Ilok and for Ruma in the Croatian Parliament. He remained there until his death on 16 January 1886.

== Playwright ==
As a playwright, Jovan Subotić achieved his purpose by encouraging national spirit and slowly developing the public's interest in the theater. As a result, two permanent theaters were built — Srpsko narodno Pozoriste (the Serbian National Theatre) in Novi Sad (1861) and Narodno Pozoriste (the National Theatre) in Belgrade (1869). Both are still leading institutions in Serbian theater life. He was a corresponding member of the Society of Serbian Letters (7 August 1844) and the Serbian Learned Society (29 July 1864).

== Works ==
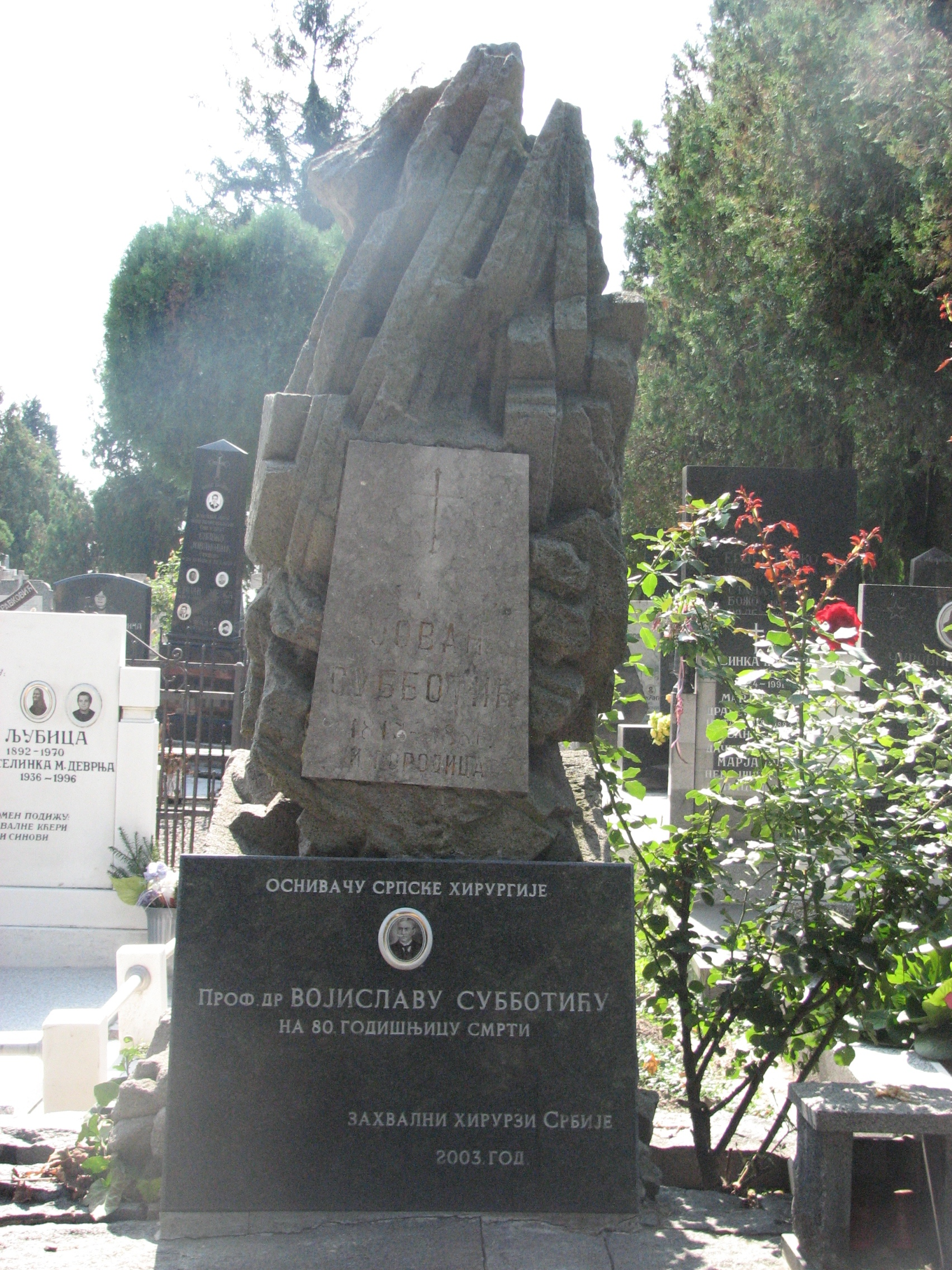
Subotic family grave in Zemun

- 1837: "Lira" (poems)
- 1838: "Potopljena Pešta"
- 1838: "Uvjenčana Nadežda" (dramatized allegory)
- 1843: "Bosilje" (lyrical poems and ballads )
- 1846: "Kralj Dečanski" (epic poetry)
- 1862: "Herceg Vladislav"
- 1863: "Nemanja" (drama)
- 1868: "Zvonimir" (drama)
- 1869: "Miloš Obilić" (tragedy)
- 1869: "Bodin"
- 1864: "Epilog"
- 1866: "Apoteoza Jelačića Bana"
- 1881: "Kaluđer" (roman).

In one of his works (epic poem on Nikola Jurišić) a subordinate theme was Skanderbeg.

Cultural offices
Preceded by Stevan Branovački	President of Matica Srpska; 1868–1872	Succeeded by Stevan Pavlović
