= Svetozar Miletić =

Serbian politician (1826–1901)

- Светозар Милетић
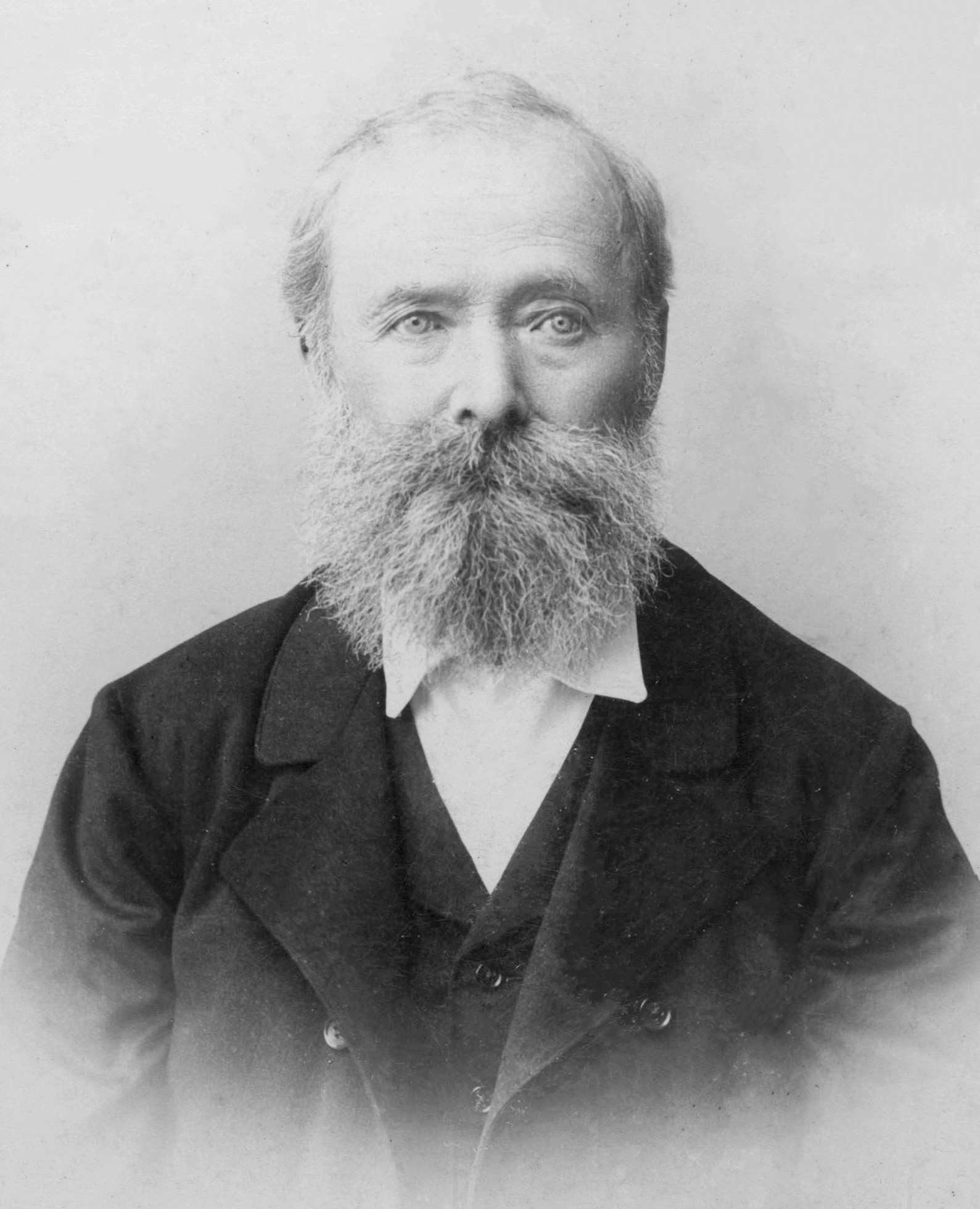
- Miletić c. 1900

27th and 30th Mayor of Novi Sad
- In office 24 April 1861 – 28 January 1862
- Preceded by: Gavrilo Polzović
- Succeeded by: Pavle Mačvanski
- In office 23 May 1867 – 30 May 1868
- Preceded by: Pavle Stojanović
- Succeeded by: Pavle Stojanović

Personal details
- Born: 22 February 1826 Mošorin, Austrian Empire
- Died: 4 February 1901 (aged 74) Vršac, Austria-Hungary
- Citizenship: Hungarian
- Party: Serb People's Liberal Party (after 1869)
- Occupation: Lawyer; journalist; politician; author

Svetozar Miletić (Serbian Cyrillic: Светозар Милетић; 22 February 1826 – 4 February 1901) was a Serbian lawyer, journalist, author, and politician who served as the mayor of Novi Sad between 1861 and 1862 and again from 1867 to 1868.

== Family ==
Miletić's ancestor was Mileta Zavišić, who came to Bačka from Kostajnica (present day Croatia) near the border of Bosnia where he led a company of three hundred men and fought against the Ottomans for thirty two years. Because the Ottomans wanted to punish him after they signed a peace treaty with the Austrians, Mileta moved to Bačka and changed his last name to Miletić. Mileta's son Sima, who was educated to be a merchant in Novi Sad, had fifteen sons and three daughters. Avram Miletić, the oldest of Sima's sons and grandfather of Svetozar Miletić, was a merchant and songwriter best known for writing the earliest collection of urban lyric poetry in the Serbian language. The second son of Avram Miletić, also named Sima like his grandfather, was a boot-maker and the father of Svetozar Miletić. Svetozar Miletić was the oldest of seven children born to Sima and Teodosija (née Rajić) Miletić in the village of Mošorin in Šajkaška, the Serbian Military Frontier, on 22 February 1826. His son-in-law Jaša Tomić, who was a publicist and leader of the Serbian radicals in Vojvodina, took up Miletić's mantle at the turn of the century.

== Education ==
Svetozar Miletić attended primary school in his hometown and was the "top student" there. He continued his education at the battalion center in Titel, in a German school. Sima Miletić took his son to Novi Sad to enroll him in a trade school, but when they stopped by a compatriot's house, a turning point occurred. When lawyer Aron Maletin saw the school report card with excellent grades in 17 subjects, he convinced Sima to give up his plan. Instead of enrolling in a trade, Sima enrolled his son in the Jovan Jovanović Zmaj Gymnasium in Novi Sad. In the memorial notes of the school states that Svetozar Miletić was "the best student that the Jovan Jovanović Zmaj Gymnasium ever had", according to the writer Jovan Hadžić. Svetozar was financially supported during his education by rich, prominent, and noble Serbs. At the request of Miloš Svetić, he received 100 forints annual assistance from the then Vršac bishop Josif Rajačić.

After passing his matriculation examination, he enrolled in 1844 at the Evangelical Lyceum in Bratislava, then called Požun, where he became involved in the work of the Serbian student group, which had 40 members and operated under the influence of Pan-Slavic ideas. They published the magazine Serbian Falcon, in which Miletić published his first literary and political texts. Fascinated by Pan-Slavism under the influence of Ľudovít Štúr, he added the name Sveslav to his name.

== Revolutions ==
After finishing his schooling, he moved on to study in Pest, Hungary, 1848, where he found himself at the beginning of turbulent events – civil revolutions that shook Europe that year and the following year. His colleagues accused him of being a traitor who wanted to bring the Russians to Hungary, and since the Serbs were not guaranteed safety in Pest and Buda at that time, Miletić returned to Šajkaška. Along the way, he rang all the church bells in every place, spreading revolutionary sentiment among the Serbs.

Immediately upon arrival, he went to Čurug and Nadalj, where he agitated against the departure of the Šajkaš Serbs to the front in Italy. The people protect him from arrest, and he goes to Belgrade via Sremski Karlovci, where he tries to influence the Serbian government to go to war against the Turks, and thus start a general Serbian uprising in the Balkans. The Serbian government, however, was unable to agree to this.

== May Assembly ==
Miletić returns to Karlovci, where he attends the May Assembly at which Serbian Vojvodina was proclaimed, a Serbian duke Stevan Šupljikac was elected, and a patriarch was proclaimed. He became a member of the Main Board, but the Patriarch Serbian Patriarch Josif Rajačić sent him to Zagreb, to agitate with Jovan Subotić among the Croats for the cause of Serbian Vojvodina, wanting to remove him from the center of events, due to his radical national stance. The two-month stay did not meet with understanding and support from the Croats, and Miletić returned to Vojvodina. Completely disappointed, he went to Mošorin and no longer actively participated in political events.

In 1849, he went to continue his studies, but to Vienna, where he managed to stay thanks to a more than generous scholarship from Mihailo Obrenović. He completed his studies in 1854, when he became a doctor of law. Then, for a while, he worked as a bailiff in Lugoš. He returned to Bačka in 1856, where he passed the bar exam in Novi Sad on 24 January 1856, and there in 1856-1857. opened a law office in Novi Sad's Dunavska street. He soon started a family and graduated from law school in 1866.

== Political life ==
He returned to political life with a series of texts in the Serbian Diary in which he discussed the situation in Europe at the time, especially in the Balkans, and mostly wrote about the state and prospects of creating a Serbian nation, especially in the Voivodeship of Serbia and the Timis Banat, into which the Serbian Voivodeship was transformed by the imperial decision (and such a Voivodeship was soon abolished and incorporated into Hungary). The most significant text that appeared in that period and that brought about a change in Serbian politics was published on the eve of Christmas 1861, under the simple title On Tucin-dan 1860. Since the Voivodeship had already been abolished by then, Miletić states that "the Voivodeship died, but that no one needed it as it was". However, it is much more important that something else died for the Serbs. Although he does not state precisely what, it is clear that he was referring to Serbian loyalty to Vienna and the Austrian emperor, from whom the Serbs expected confirmation of their rights and privileges. Miletić advocated the creation of Serbian Vojvodina, but within much smaller borders (more ethnically appropriate and expedient) than the Voivodeship. Serbian Vojvodina, in his opinion, should not be achieved “through the emperor”, but through cooperation and agreement with the Hungarians. However, when the Austro-Hungarian Compromise of 1867 occurred, the Hungarians turned their backs on the Serbs and began to fight against Serbian goals. From then on, Hungary was an even greater enemy for him than Austria. Both the Viennese court and the Hungarian government would repeatedly try to eliminate him politically and physically.

Miletić also advocated the ideas of liberal citizenship at local Serbian Orthodox churches and People's Councils. He often said: "We are Serbs, but also citizens." His ideals in public work were freedom, independence, and the unification of the Serbian people.

Like many other national leaders of non-dominant nationalities of the empire, such as Czechs František Palacký, Karel Havlíček Borovský, and Slovak Ľudovít Štúr, Miletić explicitly linked the emancipatory political demands to the national question, stressing the importance of securing national rights to achieve liberty: Only on a national basis will the real liberty of all peoples be established.

== Mayor ==
On 20 March 1861, he became the mayor of Novi Sad, the youngest in the city's history. His first associates in the Magistrate were Aleksandar Sandić, Jovan Jovanović Zmaj, and Jaša Ignjatović. As mayor, Miletić declared the Serbian language official, abolished the German Realka, and advocated for the construction of the City Hall in the Serbian part of Novi Sad. Although he had the absolute support of the Magistrate, the Hungarian government suspended him from this position. In the same year, he organized a celebration of the 100th anniversary of Sava Tekelija, with a distinctly anti-Austrian character. That year, he was also the president of the Serbian Reading Room when the Serbian National Theatre was founded under its auspices. He was elected mayor for the second time in 1867, but like the first time, it lasted only a year (until he was removed by the authorities).

== Matica srpska ==
Svetozar Miletić was an honorary member of Matica srpska since 1861. In 1864, Miletić was also involved in the relocation of Matica srpska from Pest to Novi Sad. In 1864, Miletić became a member of the Literary Department of the Matice Srpska and soon its vice-president.

== Newspapers ==
In 1866, he started as the owner and publisher of the political newspaper Zastava, the most important and influential newspaper among Serbs in Austro-Hungary. He was, with short interruptions, its long-term editor, but also the author of a huge number of invaluable texts.

== Party ==
In 1869, under his leadership, the Serbian People's Liberal Party was established – the first organized national movement among Serbs in the Habsburg Monarchy. Although the scope of work of this party, or national movement, was primarily directed towards Serbs in the Monarchy, a good part of its program (adopted only in 1869) also dealt with general national interests and issues, and was in a certain way also a national program in itself.

== Member of Parliament ==
Miletić was a member of both the Hungarian and Croatian Parliaments, one of the organizers of the first assembly of the United Serbian Youth - the first all-Serbian political organization, and later he would also be involved in the establishment of the Society for the Liberation and Unification of Serbia. From May 1867, he was again at the head of the Novi Sad Magistrate, and at that time his closest associates were Laza Kostić and Kosta Trifković. Miletić was again in the fight against the Hungarian authorities. During this term, thanks to his merit, the colors of the Serbian tricolor became the official colors of the city of Novi Sad, and as he continued his efforts to build the City Hall in the Serbian region and became a serious obstacle to the authorities, he was suspended after a year, and soon after he was arrested and sentenced to one year in prison in a staged trial. He was elected several times as a member of the Hungarian Parliament: in 1865 (representing the Bečej district), 1869, 1872, 1875 (three times the Baščaid district), and in 1881 (representing Šajkaška). He was active for a long time in the convocations of the Serbian Church and People's Assembly in Karlovci: 1864 (represented by Kulpin), 1868 (Novi Sad), 1869 (Bečej and Otočac), 1872 (Novi Sad), 1875 (Šajkaška), and 1881 (Novi Sad).

== Prison ==
Miletić was first imprisoned in 1870/1871, for a full year, from October to October. Upon his return from the Vác prison, he was welcomed very solemnly in all Serbian circles, and the speech at the reception was given by Sofija Pasković. But while he was in prison, the Serbian political scene began to disintegrate. He was told that he would be left alone if he did not make some compromise, and he replied: "I started it myself". His popularity was at its peak when he was released from prison, and wherever he appeared, large demonstrations were organized for him, which drove the Hungarian government to despair. All Serbian eyes were fixed on him, and Zmaj used to say: "Raise children from the cradle so that they may remember his image!"

He expanded his activities to other areas where Serbs lived, especially during the uprising in Herzegovina. This time, the Hungarian government decided to permanently stand in his way.

But from the second suffering in 1876, things were different. He was sentenced in 1878 to five years in prison. According to the testimony of Miletić's daughter, recorded by Jovan Jovanović Zmaj, the state prosecutor in the trial was Vasa Popović, he was tried by Judge Jerković, and he was arrested by Police Chief Maša Manojlović. He languished in prison for several years, until he was released on November 15, 1879. The Serbian Church and People's Assembly demanded that Miletić be released. This time, the Serbian leader was broken upon his release.

== Illness ==
On 5 July 1876, he was arrested in his apartment in Novi Sad, and then, in another trial, sentenced to six years in prison. In prison, he was mistreated both physically and mentally, his associates abandoned him, and in addition to other problems he had, he began to get mentally ill. He left the Vaca prison "lonely and sick". He was ill from 1879 until his return from Budapest in 1890, as if he had recovered. The first time was in 1882 and again in 1884, with increasingly serious disorders. After his release from prison, his condition seemed to improve for a while, but the illness then returned in 1892 in an even more severe form. He did not recover for the rest of his life and did not participate in political life anymore. Lazar Tomanović wrote that Miletić was a martyr for the Serbian people, that due to his imprisonment, he had damaged his physical (sciatica) and spiritual health, and that he was deteriorating every day. When he was released from prison at the age of 54, he looked like an old man of 70. Tomanović regretted that he could not visit him in the Vienna suburbs, where he was being treated 1883. year, during the excavation of the bones of Branko Radičević.

In 1896, he moved to his son, Slavko Miletić, a "practical" doctor in Vršac, where he spent the last years of his life peacefully. He died in Vršac, 4 February 1901, at the age of 75, and was buried at the Uspenski Cemetery in Novi Sad.

Svetozar was married to Anka Milutinović († 1925), and they had two children: a son, Dr. Slavko Miletić, a physician in Vršac, Minister of Public Health in several governments (1920–1927), and a daughter, Milica Tomić, married to politician and journalist Jaša Tomić, in Novi Sad.

His nephew, the son of his younger brother, is the Bulgarian philologist Ljubomir Miletić.

== Legacy ==
He is included in The 100 most prominent Serbs.

A feature film about Miletić's life titled "Ime naroda" was produced in 2020.

== Works ==
- Na Tucindan (1860; Before Christmas)
- Istočno pitanje (1863; The Eastern Question)
- Značaj i zadatak srpske omladine (1866, The importance and the task of the Serbian Youth movement)
- Federalni dualizam (1866; Federal dualism)
- Osnova programa za srpsku liberalno-opozicionu stranu (1869; The basic program of the Serbian liberal-opposition party)
- O obrazovanju ženskinja (1871; On the education of women)

== Gallery ==
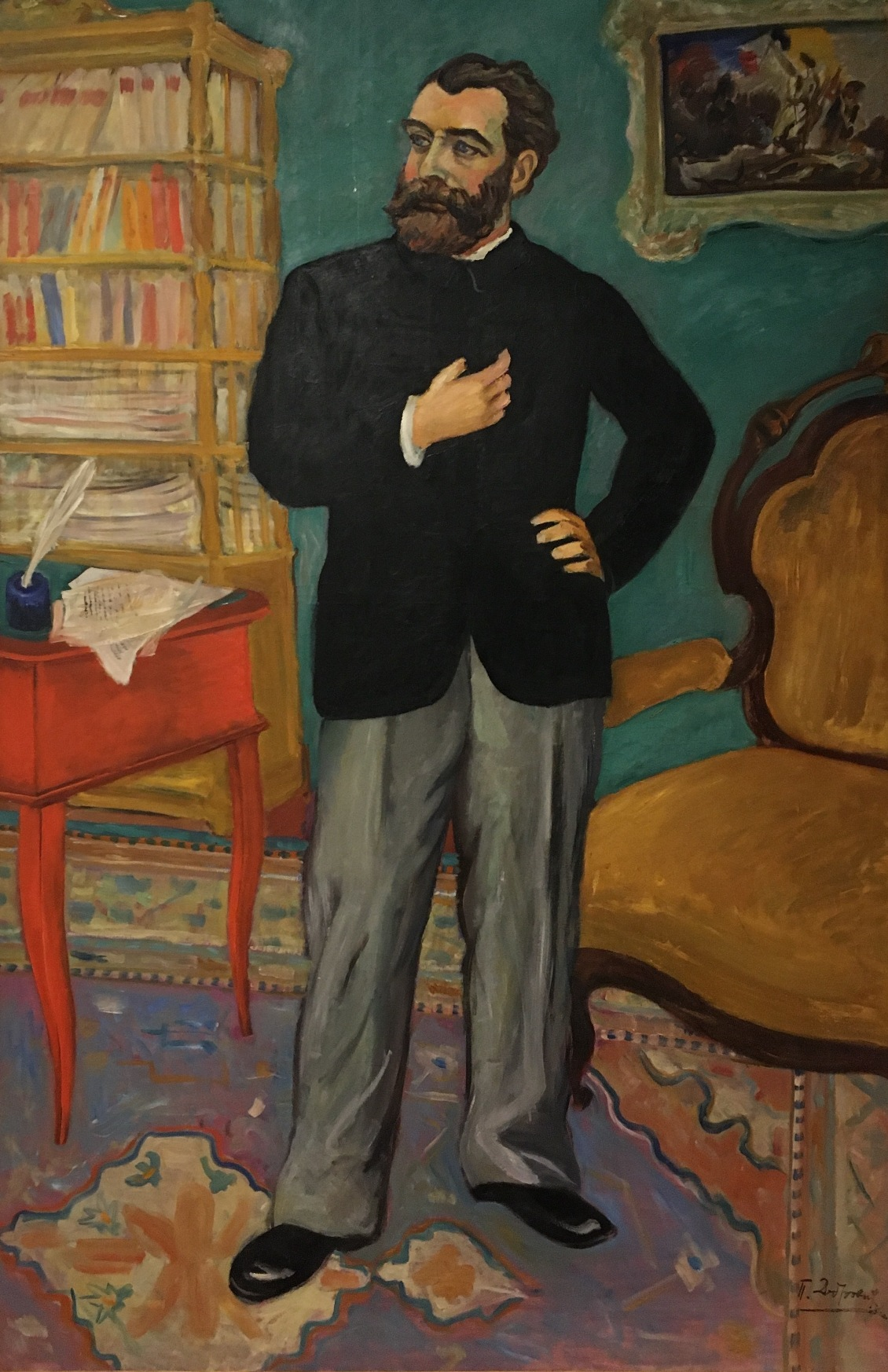
Portrait of Miletić by Petar Dobrović

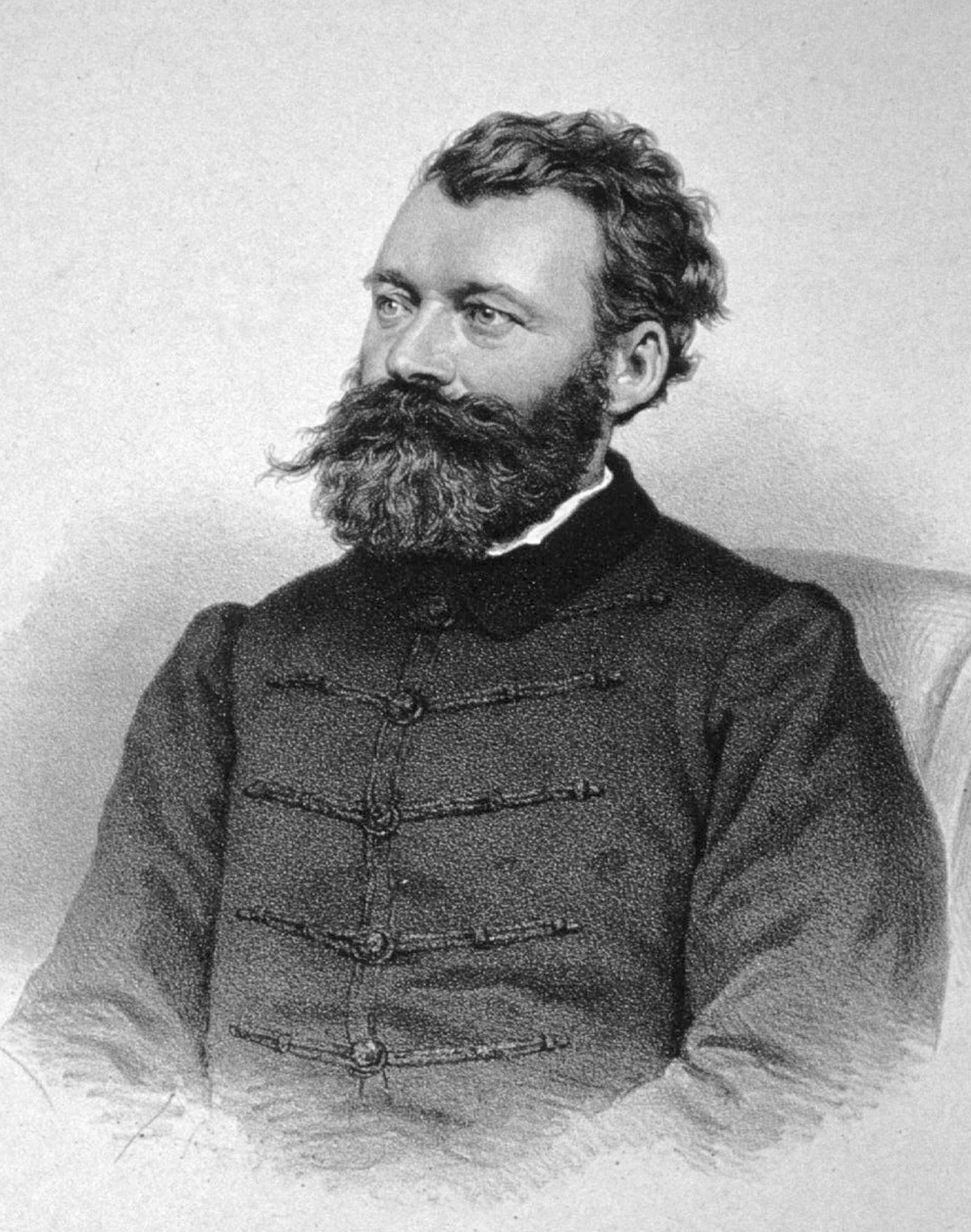
A 1867 lithograph of Miletić by Josef Kriehuber

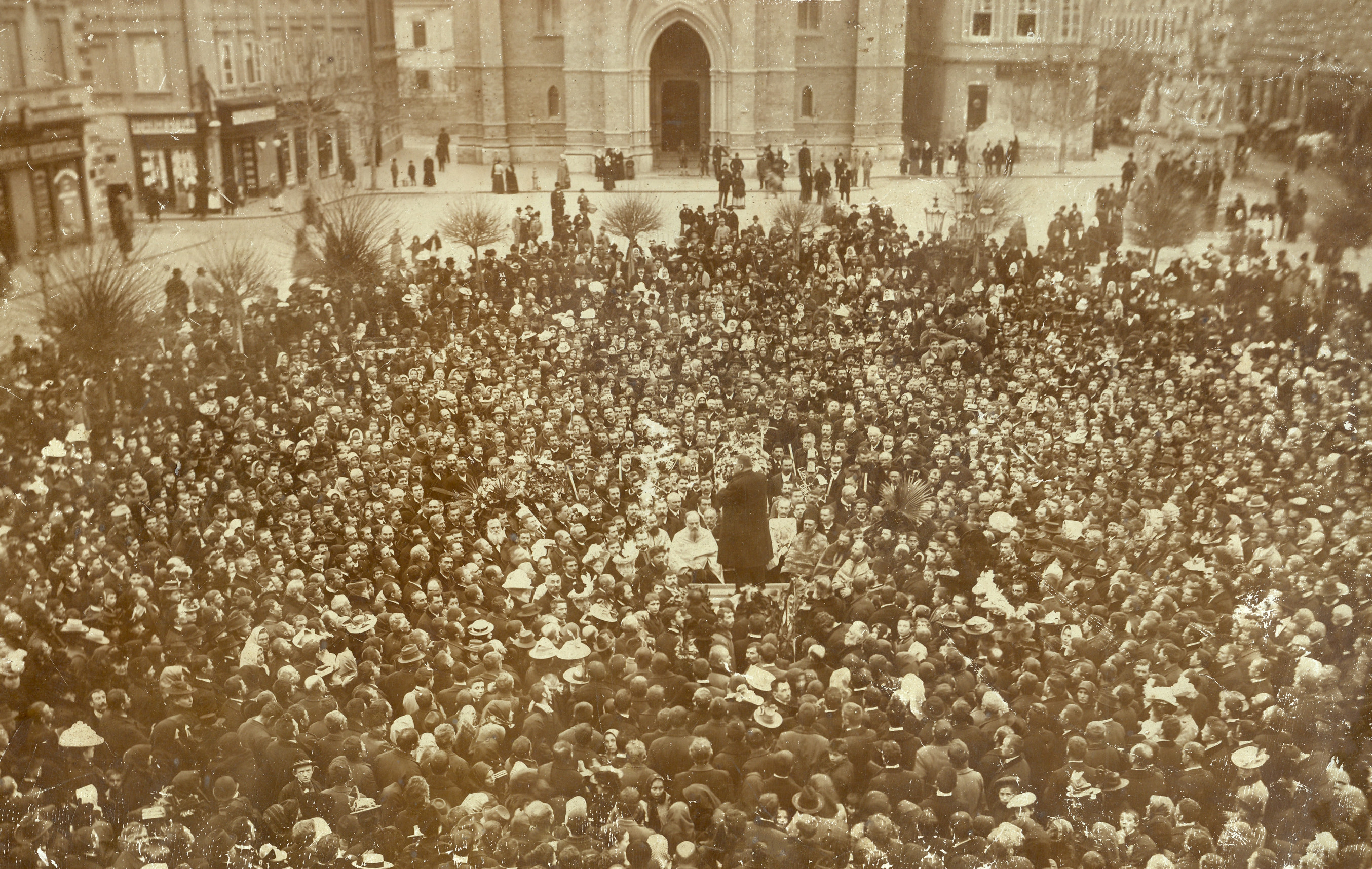
Funeral of Miletić

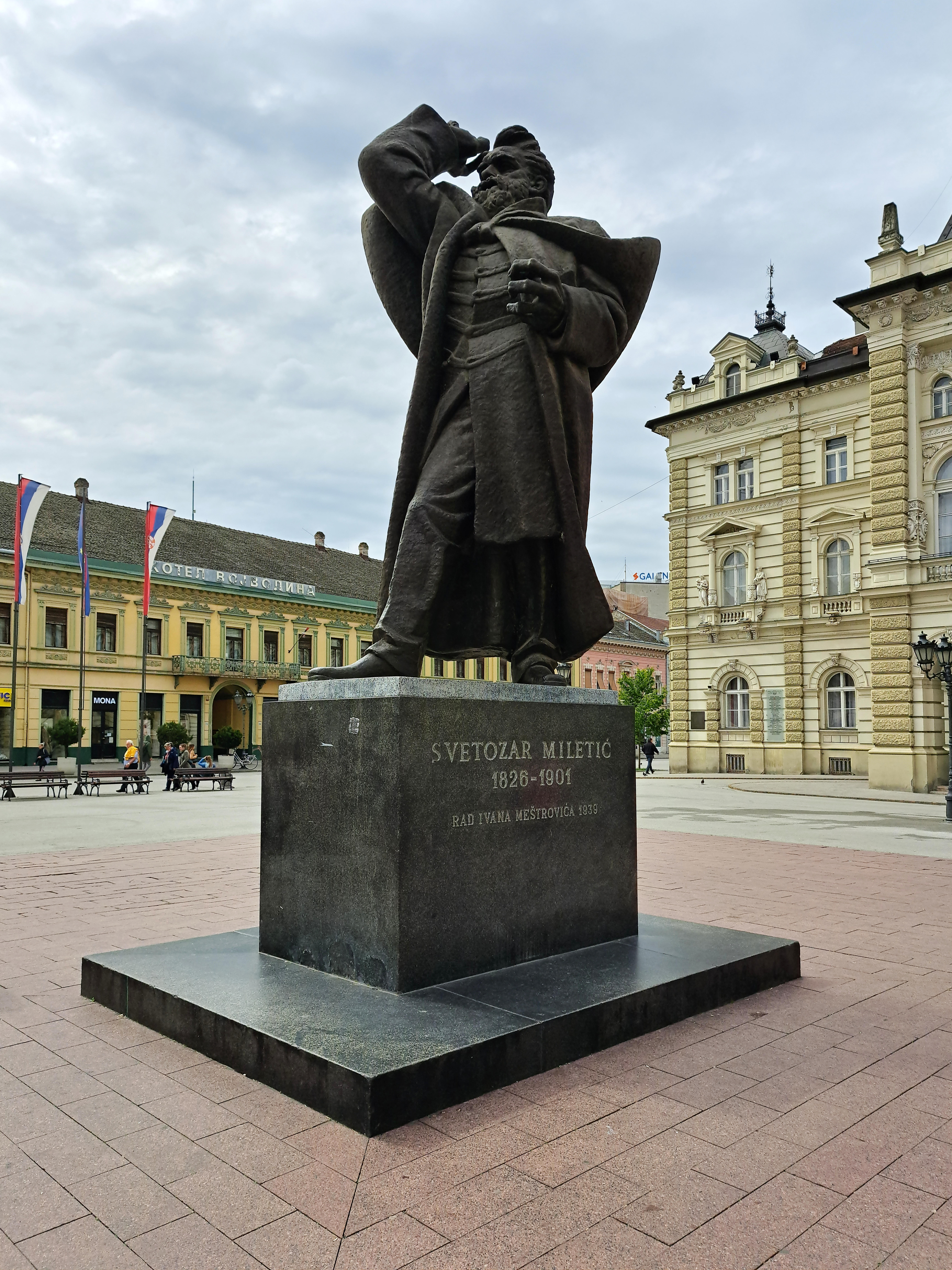
Monument to Miletić by Ivan Meštrović in Novi Sad

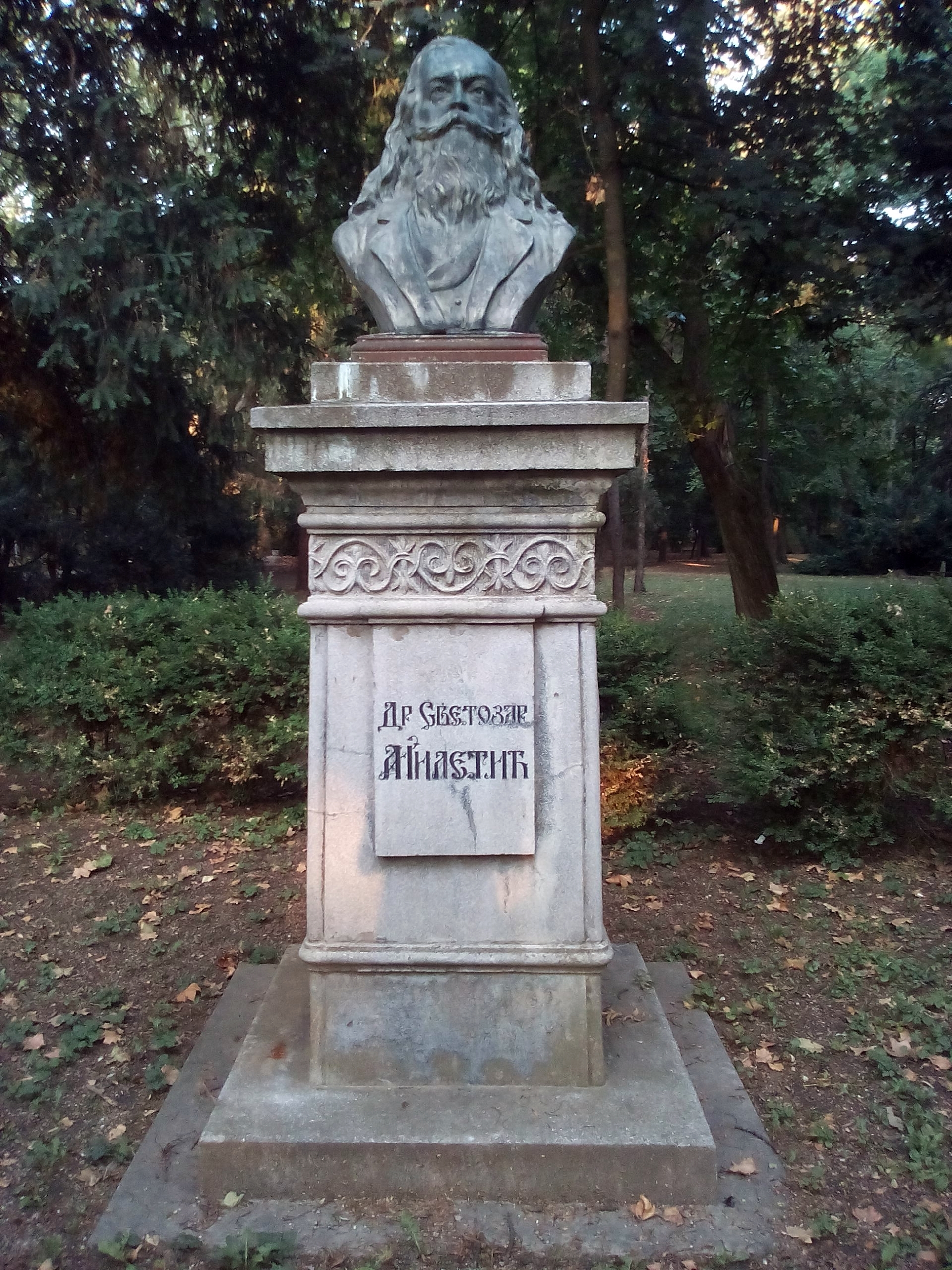
Bust in Vršac

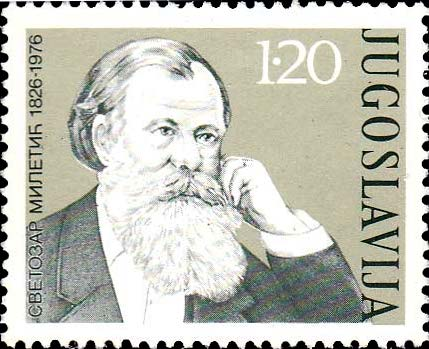
Miletić on a 1976 stamp of Yugoslavia

== See also ==
- History of Vojvodina
- Politics of Vojvodina

== Bibliography ==
- Jovan Mirosavljević, Brevijar ulica Novog Sada 1745–2001, Novi Sad, 2002.
- Vasa Stajić, "Svetozar Miletic" in The Slavonic Review, 1928, p. 106–113.

| Preceded by Gavrilo Polzović | Mayor of Novi Sad; 1861–1862 | Succeeded by Pavle Mačvanski |
| Preceded by Pavo (Pavle) Stojanović | Mayor of Novi Sad; 1867–1868 | Succeeded by Pavo (Pavle) Stojanović |
