= Jovan Djordjević =

Serbian futsal player

Djordjević
Personal information
- Full name: Jovan Djordjević
- Date of birth: 22 January 1985 (age 41)
- Place of birth: SFR Yugoslavia
- Position: Winger

Team information
- Current team: Marbo Intermezzo

International career
Years	Team	Apps	(Gls)
- Serbia

Jovan Djordjević (born 22 January 1985), is a Serbian futsal player who plays for Marbo Intermezzo and the Serbia national futsal team.
