= Jovan Jovanović Zmaj =

Serbian poet and physician (1833–1904)

Jovan Jovanović Zmaj Јован Јовановић Змај
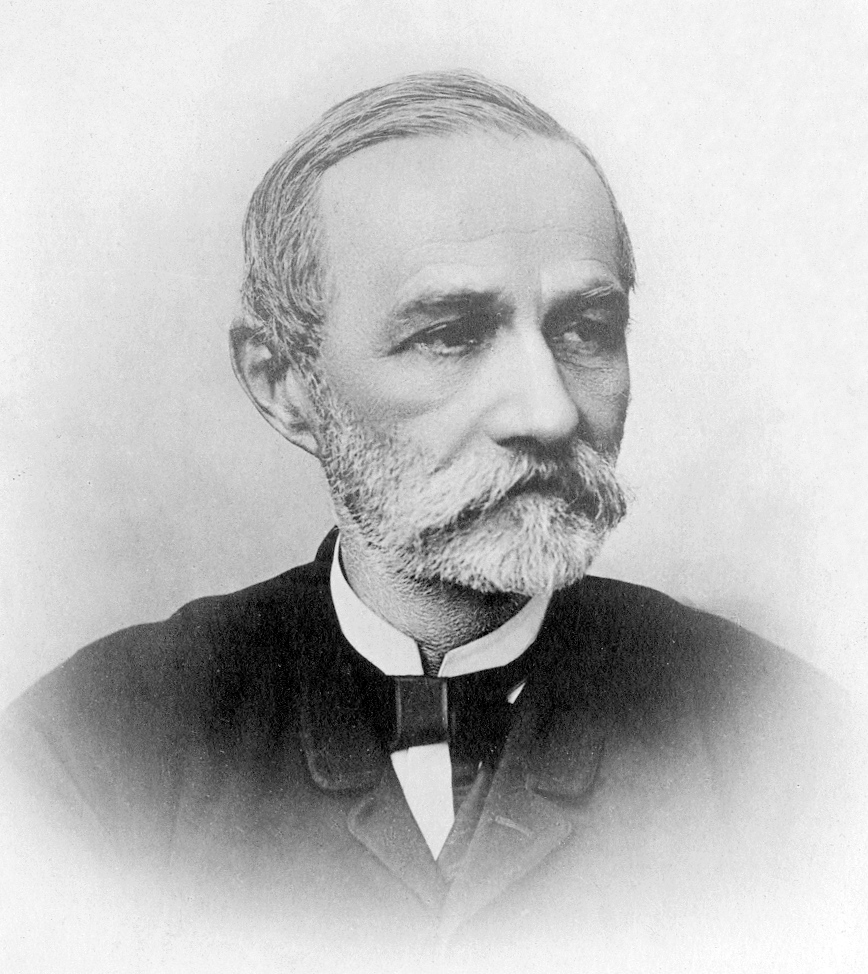
- Born: Jovan Jovanović; 24 November 1833; Újvidék, Kingdom of Hungary, Austrian Empire (today Novi Sad, Serbia)
- Died: 1 June 1904 (aged 70); Kamánc, Austria-Hungary (today part of Novi Sad, Serbia)
- Citizenship: Serbian
- Spouse: Ruža Ličanin
- Writing career
- Pen name: Zmaj
- Notable works: Đulići, Đulići uveoci, Pevanija, Druga pevanija

Signature
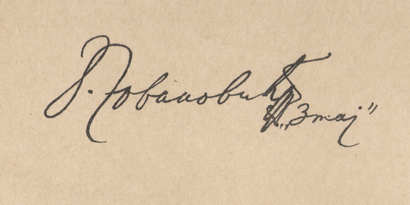

Jovan Jovanović Zmaj (Serbian Cyrillic: Јован Јовановић Змаj, pronounced [jɔ̌v̞an jɔv̞ǎːnɔv̞it͡ɕ zmâj]; 24 November 1833 – 1 June 1904) was a Serbian poet, translator and physician.

Jovanović worked as a physician; he wrote in many poetry genres, including love, lyric, patriotic, political, and youth, but he remains best known for his children's poetry. His nursery rhymes have entered the Serbian national consciousness and people sing them to their children without knowing who wrote them. Jovanović also translated the works of some of the great poets, such as Russians Lermontov and Pushkin, Germans Goethe and Heine, and the American Longfellow.

Jovanović's nickname Zmaj (Змај, 'dragon') derives from the 3 May 1848 assembly. (Note: Written in Serbian Cyrillic ("3.мај."), the dot, indicating an ordinal number, was mistakenly left out and was thus read as "3мај".)

== Biography ==
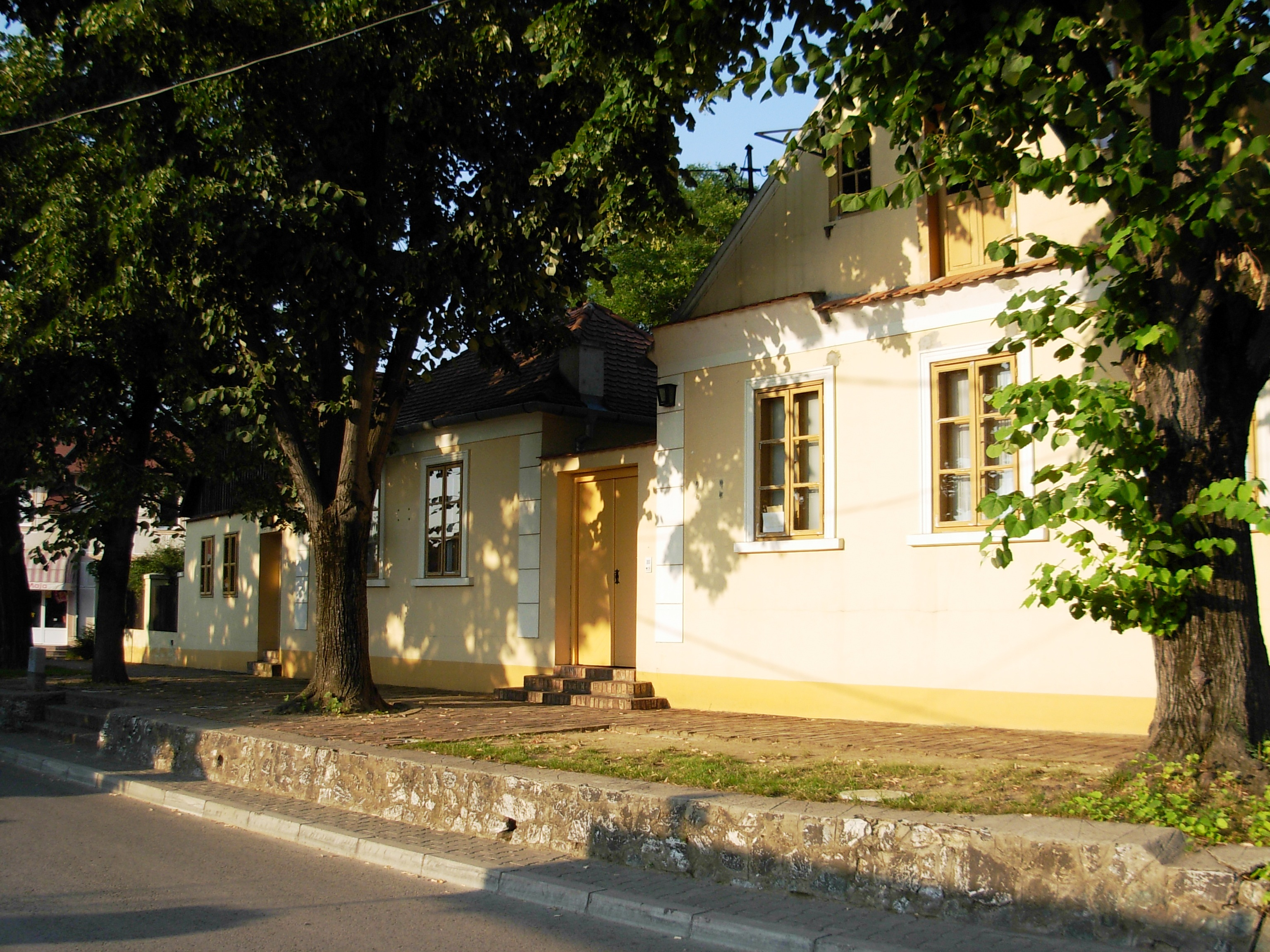
House of Jovan Jovanović Zmaj in Sremska Kamenica

Zmaj was born in Újvidék, which was then part of Bács-Bodrog County (Kingdom of Hungary, Austrian Empire; today Novi Sad in Serbia), on 24 November 1833. His family was old and noble, and had roots in modern-day North Macedonia. His father came from a family of Aromanian descent, which is something that neither Zmaj nor other people from his epoch discussed, probably meaning that his family was fully assimilated. His mother, Marija, hailed from a distinguished Serb family, descended from the town of Srbobran, and was the daughter of Pavle Gavanski. The Jovanovićs lived in Vojvodina as of the 18th century. Zmaj's father Pavle served as the mayor of Novi Sad after the Hungarian Revolution of 1848 and his three brothers were soldiers, government officials and Serbian patriots. In his early childhood he showed a desire to learn by heart the Serbian national songs that were recited to him. As a child he began to compose poems. He finished elementary school in the town, and attended secondary school in Halas and Preßburg (today Bratislava), later studying law in Ofenpesth (Budapest), Prague and Vienna. This was his father's wish but his own inclinations prompted him to take up the study of medicine. Zmaj then returned to his native city, where he accepted prominent official position. A year later, his poetic instincts caused him to leave his job to devote himself entirely to literary work. In 1870, Zmaj returned to Novi Sad to work as a doctor, motivated by the tuberculosis from which his wife and children were suffering.

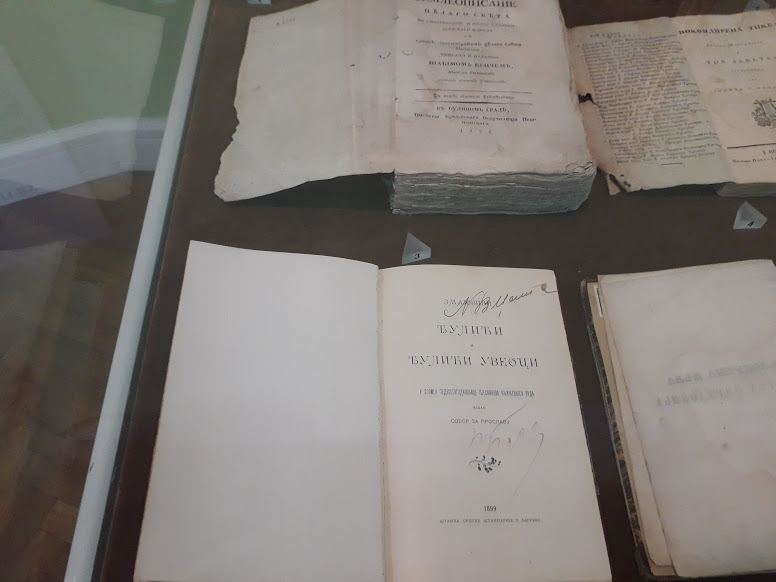
Zmaj's "Roses" and "Faded roses", exponats in Museum of Vojvodina

His literary career began in 1849 and in 1852 his first poem was printed in a journal called Srbski Letopis (Serbian Annual Review); he contributed to this and to other journals, notably Neven and Sedmica. From that period until 1870, besides his original poems, he made many translations of works by Sándor Petőfi and János Arany to Serbian from Hungarian, from Russian the works of Lermontov, as well as some German and Austrian poets. In 1861 he edited the comic journal Komarac (The Mosquito), with Đorđe Rajković. That same year he started the literary journal Javor and contributed many poems to these journals.

In 1861, Zmaj married; during the years that followed he produced a series of lyrical poems called Đulići, which probably remains his masterpiece. In 1862, greatly to his regret, he discontinued his journal Javor. He was politically engaged and sympathized with the ideas of the United Serbian Youth, a movement that attracted a number of influential figures in Serbian public life in the 1860s and 1870s.

In 1863, Zmaj was elected director of the Tekelianum at Budapest. He renewed the study of medicine at the university and became a doctor of medicine. Zmaj wrote a lot of articles on hygiene, health and diet, and several scientific works. He also devoted himself to the education of Serbian youth. During his stay in Budapest he founded the literary society Preodnica, of which he was president. In 1864 he started the satirical journal "Zmaj" ("The Dragon"), which was so popular its name became a part of his own. In 1866, his comic play "Šaran" was given with great success.

In 1870, he began working as a physician. He was also an active advocate of cremation. Matica Srpska, the Serbian Medical Society and Serbian Literary Guild made Zmaj a full member.

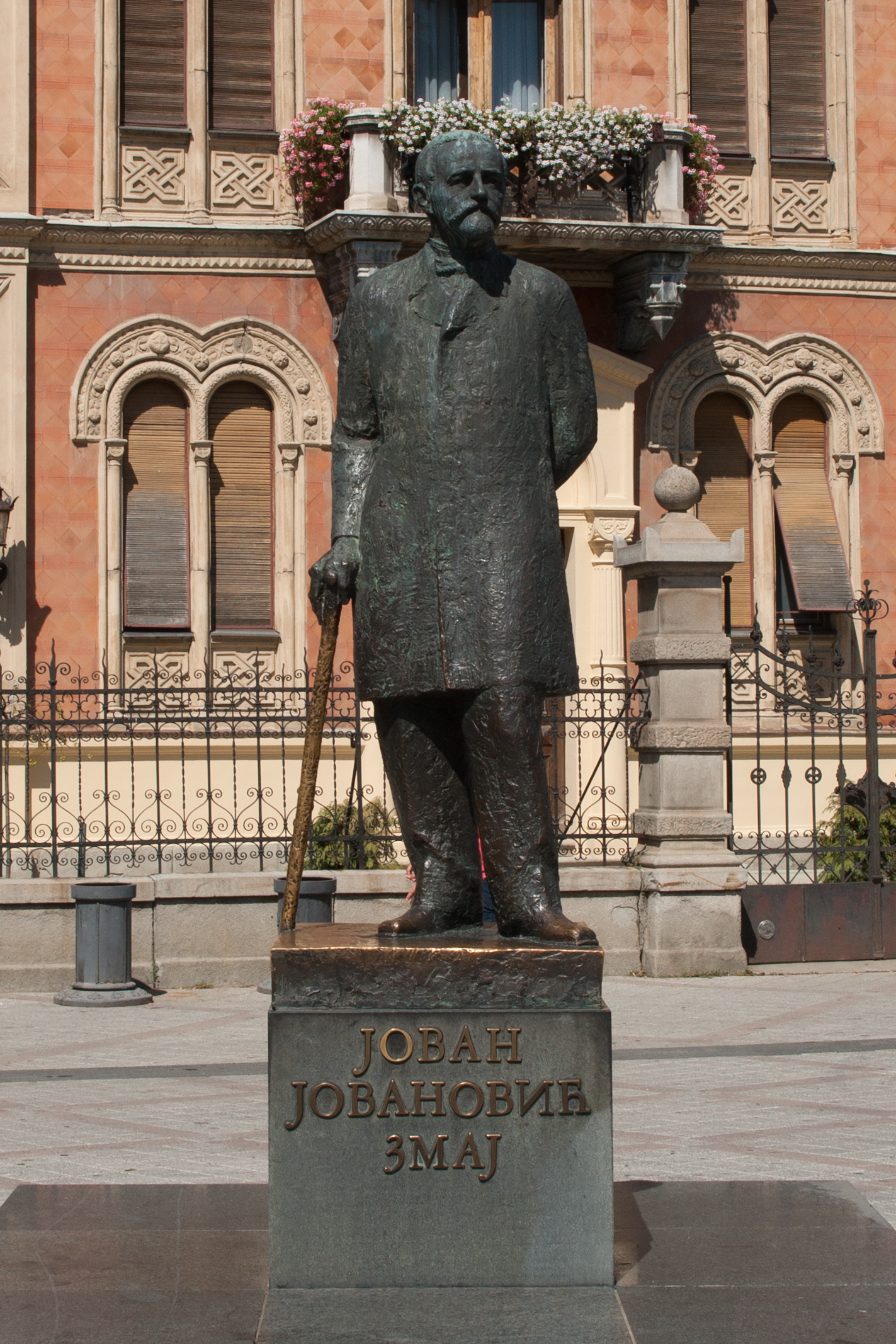
Monument to Zmaj in Novi Sad

The death of his wife in 1872 was followed by that of the couple's only child who outlived her mother, out of his five children. He was very sad and wrote many sad poems. In 1873 he started another comic journal, the Žiža. In 1877 he began an illustrated chronicle of the Russo-Turkish War, and in 1878 began his popular comic journal Starmali. During this period he wrote poems and prose, including short novels.

He considered that the Serbian nation should be above the religious divide.

Zmaj died on 1 June 1904 in Kamánc (today Sremska Kamenica, part of Novi Sad, Serbia).

== Literary works ==
Zmaj wrote lyrical songs under the collective titles Đulići (Little Rosebuds) and Đulići Uveoci (Faded Little Rosebuds), his most-creative work. He wrote six large volumes of his Pevanija (The Book of Songs), and several smaller collections including satires, epigrams, and children's songs. His work was published in the United States by Robert Underwood Johnson, who was editor and publisher of New York City's Century Magazine and a good friend of Nikola Tesla. Tesla himself translated some poems by Zmaj. In the following we have the poet's definition of poetry:

Where is Pain and dire Distress,
Songs shall soothe like soft caress;
Though the stoutest courage fails,
Song's an anchor in all gales;
When all others fail to reach,
Song shall be the thrilling speech;
Love and friends and comfort fled,
Song shall linger by your bed;
And when Doubt shall question, Why?
Song shall lift you to the sky.

Zmaj is best known for his poetry for children and was one of the first authors of comic strips in Serbia.

== Legacy ==
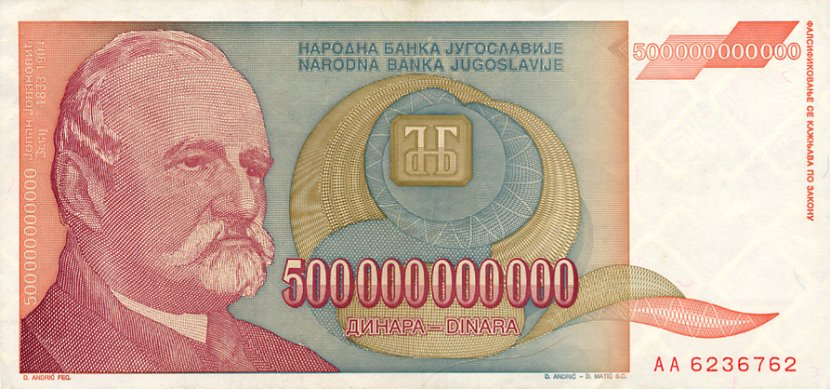
Zmaj was featured on the five-hundred billion Yugoslav dinar banknote.

The Zmaj Children Games (Змајеве дечје игре/Zmajeve dečje igre), one of the biggest festivals for children in Serbia, are named after Jovan Jovanović Zmaj. The town of Sremska Kamenica bore the name Zmajeva Kamenica (Zmaj's Kamenica) in his honour. He is included in lists of The 100 most prominent Serbs. During his lifetime, Zmaj had acquired the title of the "people's poet", an expression of esteem also befitting the title of Poet laureate.

August Šenoa wrote highly of his poetry. Literary historian Jovan Deretić considered Zmaj to be one of the central figures of Serbian Romanticism and Serbian literature of the second half of the 19th century. Deretić praised his poems, translations and satirical works.

Children's poetry written by Zmaj is still popular in Serbia and the wider Balkans region.

== Works ==
=== Collections of poems ===
- Đulici
- Đulici uveoci
- Pevanija
- Druga pevanija
- Snohvatice I-III, 1895 and 1900
- Devesilje, 1900
- Istočni biser
- Pesme Mirca Shafije
- Čika Jova srpskoj omladini
- Istočni biser, 1861

=== Prose and Drama ===
- Vidosava Branković, 1860
- Šaran, 1864
- Nesrećna Kafina

=== Selected translations ===
- Herman i Doroteja by Johann Wolfgang von Goethe
- Sionsko jharfi, NeueZіonѕharfe, Zürіch, 1855
- Pesme Mirca Shafije
- Istočni biser, anthology of Eastern poetry, 1861
- Demon by Mikhail Lermontov, 1863
- Vitez Jovan, by Sándor Petőfi, 1860
- Aranj Toldi, 1858
- Toldijina starost
- Toldijina ljubav, 1896
- Otmu Muranj-grada, 1878
- Enoh Arden by Alfred, Lord Tennyson, 1880
- Čovekova tragedija, 1890
- Ifigenija u Tavridi by Johann Wolfgang von Goethe, 1898-1900
- Der Gott und die Bajadere by Johann Wolfgang von Goeth

== See also ==
- Laza Lazarević
- Julije Bajamonti
- Vladan Đorđević
- Miodrag Pavlović
- Milan Savić
- Vladan Radoman

== Sources ==
- This article incorporates text from the Zmai Iovan Iovanovich – the Chief Servian Poet of To-Day by Nikola Tesla, a publication now in the public domain.
- Jovan Skerlić, Istorija Nove Srpske Književnosti (Belgrade, 1921), pages 298–309.
- Божидар Ковачек. "Јован Јовановић Змај (1833–1904)". Projekat Rastko.
