= Matica srpska =

Serbian cultural institution

- Матица српска
- Official logo
- Formation: 1 June 1826; 200 years ago
- Type: Cultural institution, Nonprofit and Non-governmental organization
- Legal status: Active
- Purpose: Cultural studies
- Headquarters: Novi Sad, Serbia
- Location: Serbia
- Coordinates: 45.259281°N 19.8451362°E
- Members: 3.000
- President: prof. dr. Dragan Stanić
- Website: www.maticasrpska.org.rs

The Matica srpska (Serbian Cyrillic: Матица српска; Latin: Matrix Serbica) is the oldest Serbian language independent, non-profit, non-governmental and cultural-scientific Serbian national institution. It was founded on June 1, 1826, in Pest (today a part of Budapest) by the Serb Habsburg legislator Jovan Hadžić and other prominent members of the Serbian Revolution and Revival. The Matica was moved to Novi Sad in 1864. It is the oldest matica in the world.

The main goals are to restore and promote Serbian national and cultural identity in the fields of art, science, spiritual creativity, economy and public life as well as to care for the social development of Serbia. The literary and cultural society played a huge role in the flourishing of science and culture of the Serbs of Vojvodina, Serbia.

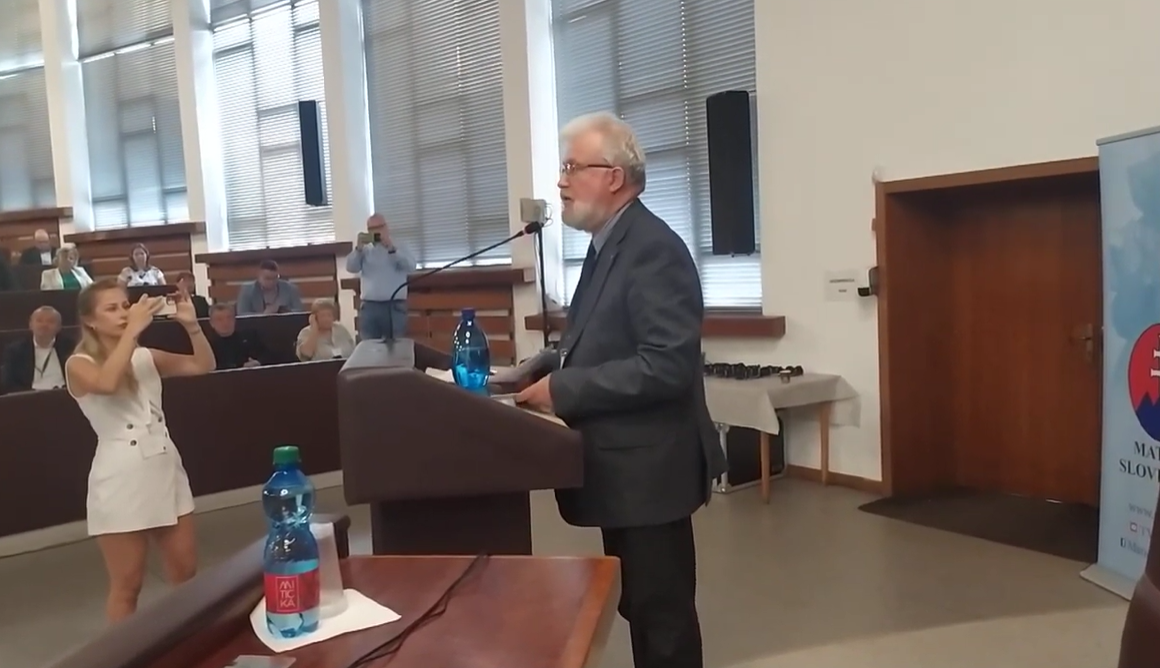
Chairman of the Serbian Matica Dragan Stanić at the VI. Congress of Maticas and Institutions of Slavic Nations

The need for national homogenization, enlightenment, as well as the publication of Serbian books, were the main reasons for the formation of such a society. The immediate reason for founding Matica srpska was the need to take over the Serbian Chronicle (later the Chronicle of Matica Srpska), the oldest Serbian literary magazine and then the only Serbian newspaper, which was threatened with extinction.

The Matica Srpska Publishing Center has regular publishing activities, including several projects of national importance, such as Ten Centuries of Serbian Literature (Десет векова српске књижевности).

Today, in the Palace of Matica srpska in Novi Sad more than a hundred book presentations, scientific symposia, round table discussions, professional and scientific lectures and concerts of classical music are being organized annually. Matica Srpska is also one of the largest and most important book and magazine publishers in Serbia.

Matica Srpska operates on the territory of Croatia, Bosnia and Herzegovina (Republika Srpska) and Montenegro. In addition, Matica Srpska operates in Vienna.

== Etymology ==
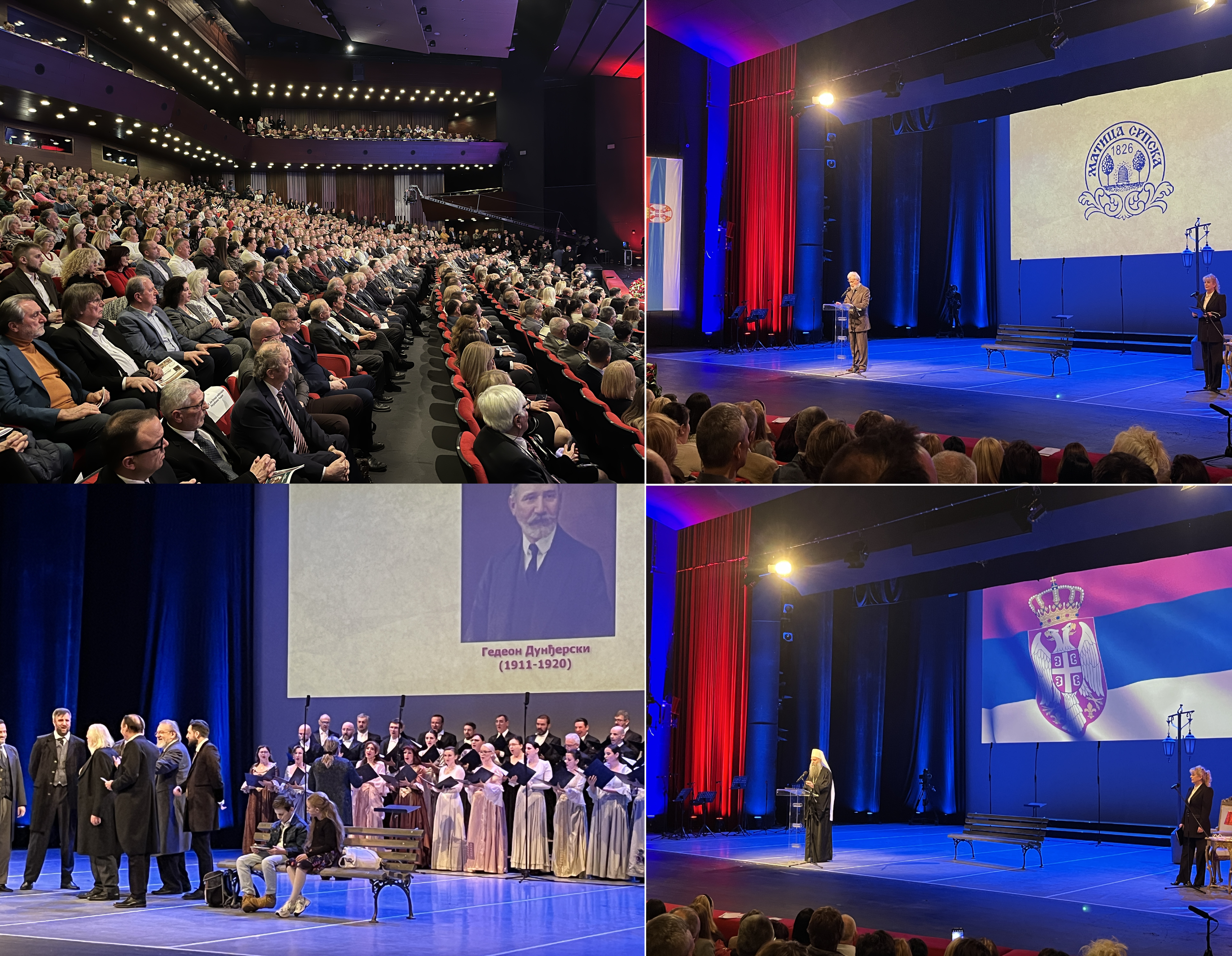
200th anniversary of the Matica srpska

The name Matica is best translated as "The Center", although the term matica in this context translates as "queen bee" or "parent body", and the adjective srpska refers to Serbia and/or Serbs. According to this, the name of Matica srpska can be literally translated into English as "Parent body of the Serbs" or "Mother Serbia".

== History ==
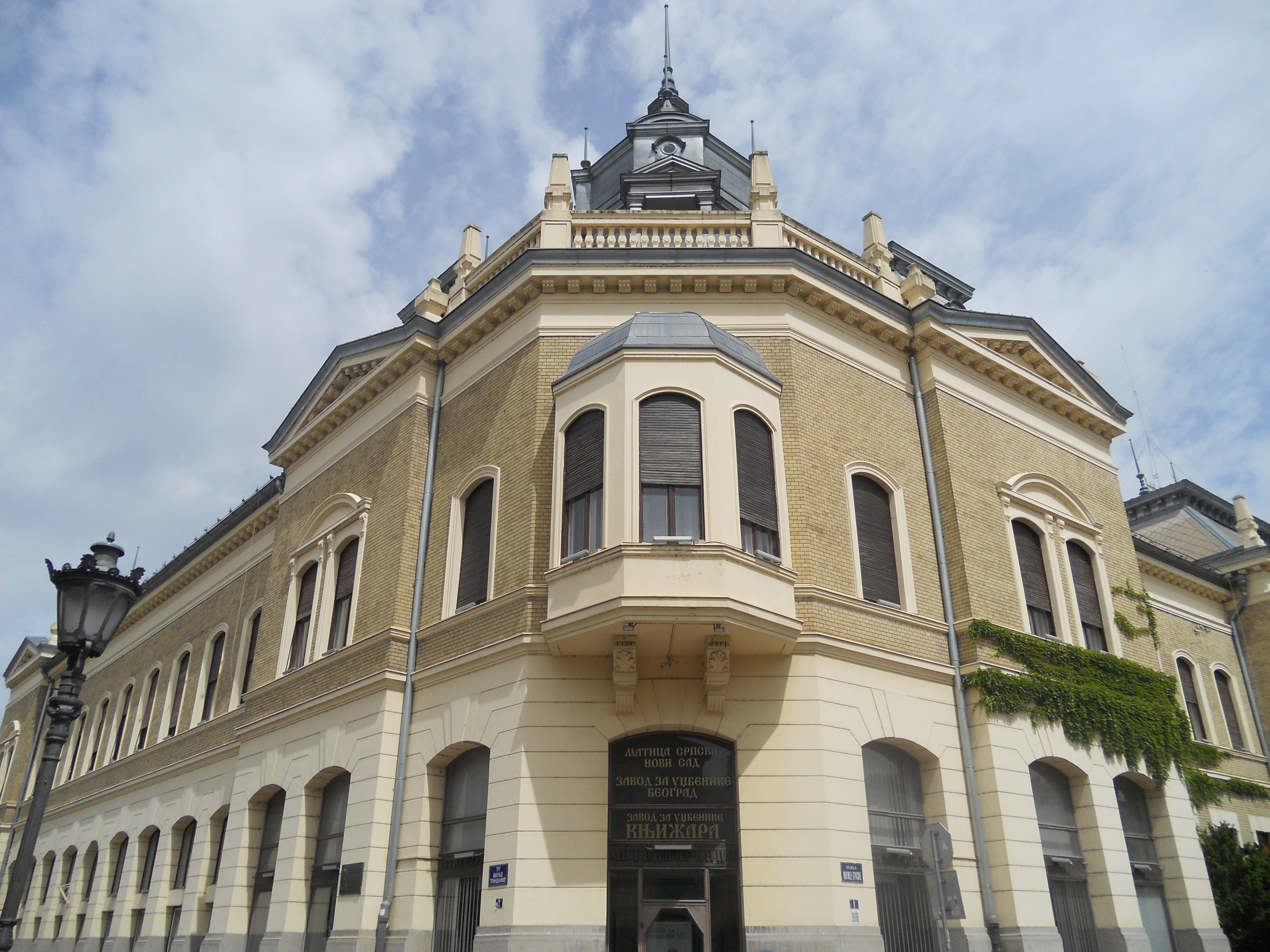
Building of Matica srpska

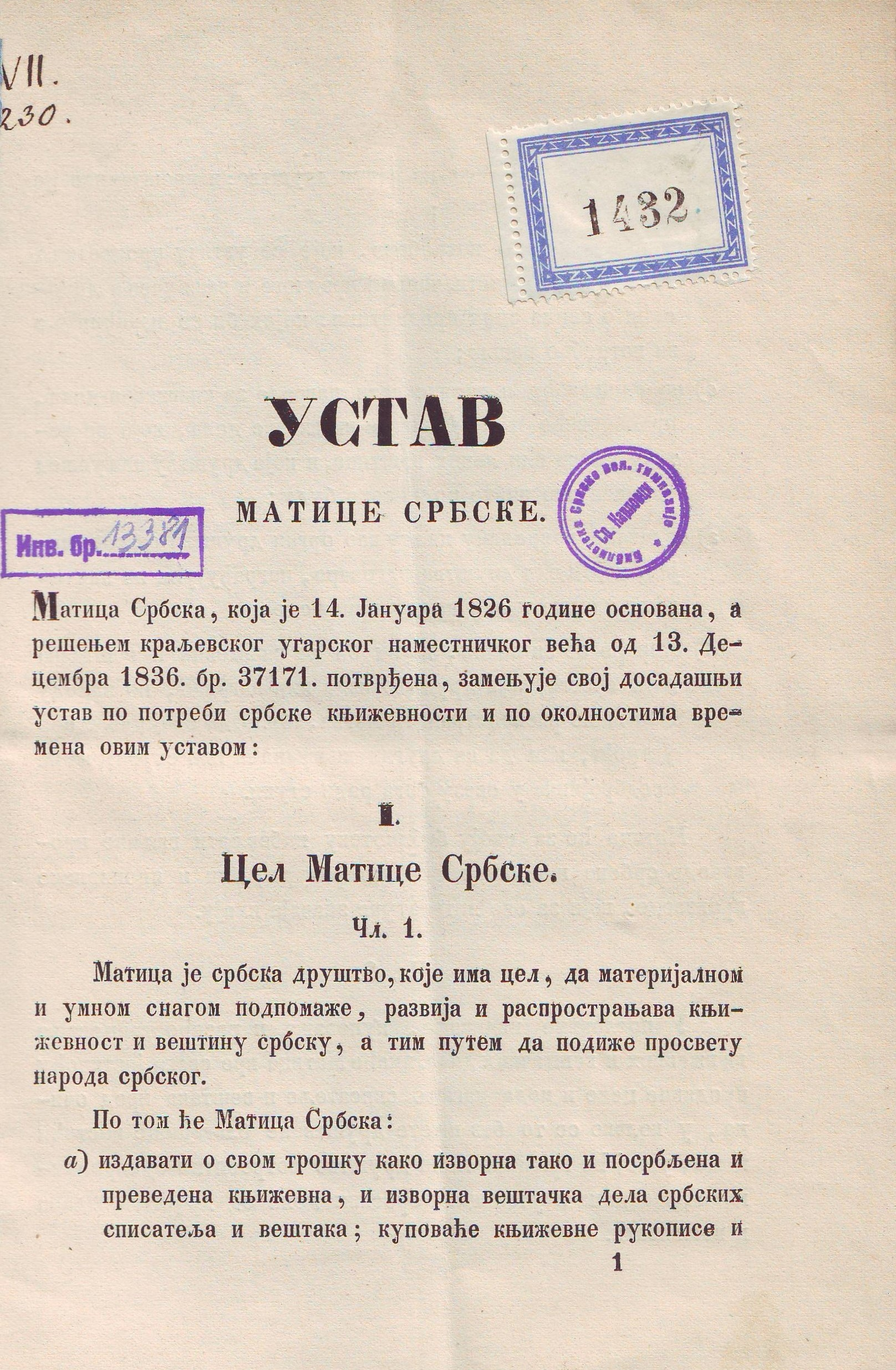
First page of the first 1826 Matica srpska Constitution

Of all the Slavic maticas, Matica Srpska was the first to be established in the Habsburg Empire at the time of a Serb national and cultural awakening.

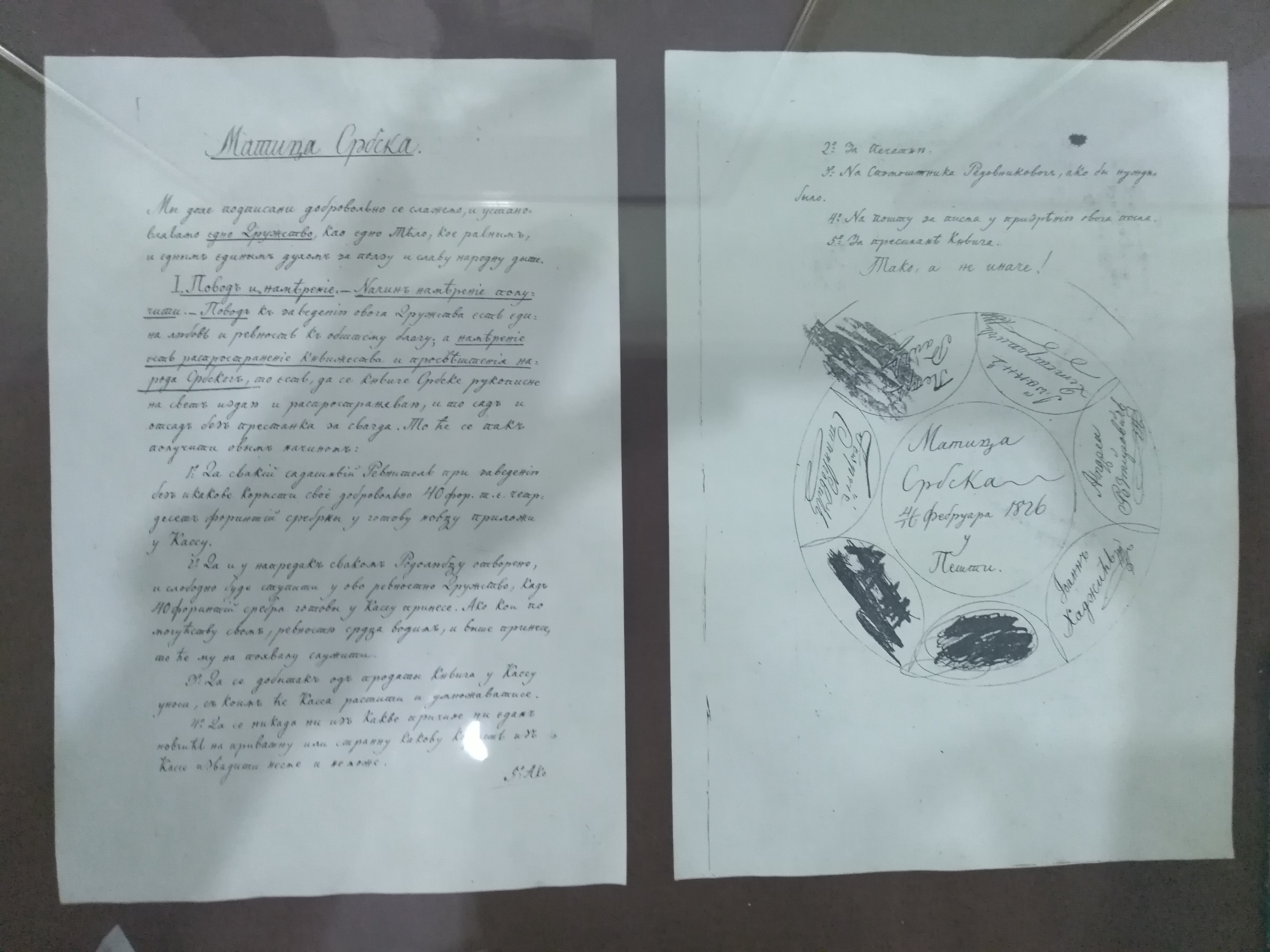
Matica Srpska Charter

During the national awakening from the end of the 18th and the beginning of the 19th century, the Serbs of the Serbian Vojvodina played a significant role as, though "by force of historical circumstance, they formed at this period the core of Serb intellectual life". One of the most important tasks facing the Serbs, in advancing cultural-national rebirth, was the solution of the literary language problem, and, as a result of the first fifty years of the 19th century, saw the Vojvodina Serbs engaged in an intense debate about the kind of literary language that their newly revitalized, emerging nation should adopt.

For the Slavic people, as well as the non-Slavs, under the Habsburg Empire, the Matica foundation fomented the development of national cultures. Indeed, the oldest is Matica srpska founded in 1826 in Pest by Jovan Hadžić and his business backers, Josif Milovuk (1793–1850), Jovan Demetrović (1778–1830), Gavrilo Bozitovac (1789–1856), Andrej Rozmirović, Petar Rajić, and Djordje Stanković (1782–1853) at the same time as the Hungarian Academy was being built. Jovan Hadžić prepared its by-laws, secured its charter, and also served as its first president while Josif Milovuk served as its first secretary. In addition to books, it published the journal Serbski letopis, founded two years earlier by Georgije Magarašević, Pavel Jozef Šafařík, and Lukijan Mušicki in Novi Sad, where Magarašević was professor and Šafařík the director of Novi Sad's Serbian Gymnasium.

The story of the Matica Srpska actually began in 1824, when the Austrian authorities permitted writer Georgije Magarašević, a professor at a gymnasium in the town of Novi Sad, to publish a literary and scholarly journal entitled "Serbski letopis" ("Serbian Annals"). Magarašević had little financial backing but soon found benefactors who supported his efforts. In time, the writers and editors of the publication developed into a learned society, successfully overcoming pressures applied by mistrustful Austrian officials as well as later financial difficulties. With varying degrees of success but with great perseverance, it has continued to support and guide Serb intellectual endeavor, first, as a part of the Habsburg Empire and much later as part of the Kingdom of Serbs, Croats, and Slovenes.

In 1838, a wealthy Serb landowner, Sava Tekelija, left the Matica a legacy to support Serbian students at the University of Pest and a college named after him, Tekelijanum (Tokolyanum in Hungarian). The Hungarian authorities were suspicious of the Matica and even suspended its activities in 1835–1836 for alleged pan-Slavism, but they resisted Serb efforts to move the institution to Novi Sad. In 1863 the move was nevertheless accomplished, and the Matica, as well as the journal Letopis, is flourishing there today.

The Matica Srpska Society was one of the initiators of the Novi Sad agreement on the Serbo-Croatian language (1954), and it led the action for making the unique orthography of the language (1960). They compiled The Vocabulary of Serbian Standard Literary Language in six volumes (1967–76).

In Yugoslavia, Matica Srpska was one half of a joint project (with Matica hrvatska) to develop a common Serbo-Croatian dictionary. Mid-way through the project (1967), Matica hrvatska, by the declaration of principles about the Croatian language, withdrew, and Matica srpska was left to finish the dictionary on her own.

Matica Srpska has been an example to many Slavic nations. Based on this model the following institutions were established: Czech Matica in 1831, Illyrian Matica in 1842 (in 1874 renamed to Matica hrvatska); Matica Lužičkosrpska in 1847, Halych-Russian Matica in Lviv in 1848; Moravian Matica in 1849; Matica Dalmatinska in Zadar in 1861; Slovak Matica in 1863; Slovenian Matica in 1864; Matica Opava in 1877; Matica in the Teschen Princedom in 1898. (from which Silesian Matica came to be in 1968); Polish Matica in Lviv (1882); Educational Matica in the Teschen Princedom in 1885; Educational Matica in Warsaw in 1905; Bulgarian Matica in Constantinople in 1909 and the new Bulgarian Matica in 1989.

== Activities and library ==
Matica Srpska publishes the Letopis Matice srpske magazine, which is one of the oldest in the world, being continuously published since 1824.

The institution has already published numerous books by authors such as Jovan Sterija Popović since its inception.

The Law of the Matica Srpska Society (1986) regulates matters of endowment and legacy, given by the national benefactors, and how money is spent for various cultural and educational purposes.

The Matica Srpska has a library with over 3,500,000 books and other documents.

== Presidents ==
President
#	Portrait	Name
1		Jovan Hadžić
2		Mihailo Jovanović
3		Sava Tekelija
4		Platon Atanacković
5		Pavle Trifunac
6		Pavle Kojić
7		Stevan Branovački
8		Jovan Subotić
9		Stevan Pavlović
10		Đorđe Natošević
11		Laza Stanojević
12		Miloš Dimitrijević
13		Antonije Hadžić
14		Gedeon Dundjerski
15		Radivoje Vrhovac
16		Vasa Stajić
17		Aleksandar Moč
18		Milan Petrović
19		Veljko Petrović
20		Radomir Radujkov
21		Mladen Leskovac
22		Milivoj Nikolajević
23		Živan Milisavac
24		Boško Petrović
25		Božidar Kovaček
26		Čedomir Popov
27		Dragan Stanić

== Editors of Letopis Matice srpske ==
- Georgije Magarašević (1824–1830)
- Jovan Hadžić (1830–1831)
- Pavle Stamatović (1831–1832)
- Teodor Pavlović (1832–1841)
- Jovan Subotić (1841–1848)
- Sima Filipović (1848)
- Jovan Subotić (1850–1853)
- Jakov Ignjatović (1854–1856)
- Jovan Mladenović-Subota (1856–1857)
- Jovan Đorđević (1857–1859)
- Antonije Hadžić (1859–1871)
- Jovan Bošković (1871–1875)
- Antonije Hadžić (1876–1895)
- Milan Savić (1896–1911)
- Tihomir Ostojić (1912–1914)
- Vasa Stajić (1921)
- Kamenko Subotić (1922–1923)
- Marko Maletin (1923–1929)
- Stevan Ćirić (1929)
- Svetislav Banica (1929)
- Radivoje Vrhovac (1930)
- Todor Manojlović (1931)
- Žarko Vasiljević (1932)
- Nikola Milutinović (1933–1935)
- Vasa Stajić (1936) pedagogue
- Nikola Milutinović (1936–1941)
- Živan Milisavac (1946–1957)
- Mladen Leskovac (1958–1964)
- Boško Petrović (1964–1969)
- Aleksandar Tišma (1969–1973) novelist
- Dimitrije Vučenov (1974–1979)
- Momčilo Milankov (1979)
- Boško Ivkov (1980–1991)
- Slavko Gordić (1992–2008)
- Ivan Negrišorac (2008–2012) is the pen name of poet Dragan Stanić
- Slobodan Vladušić (2013–2016)
- Đorđe Despić (2017–2020)
- Đorđo Sladoje (2021–2023)

== See also ==
- List of libraries in Serbia
