= Sava Tekelija =

Serbian lawyer (1761–1842)

Count Sava Tekelija von Vizes und Kevermes
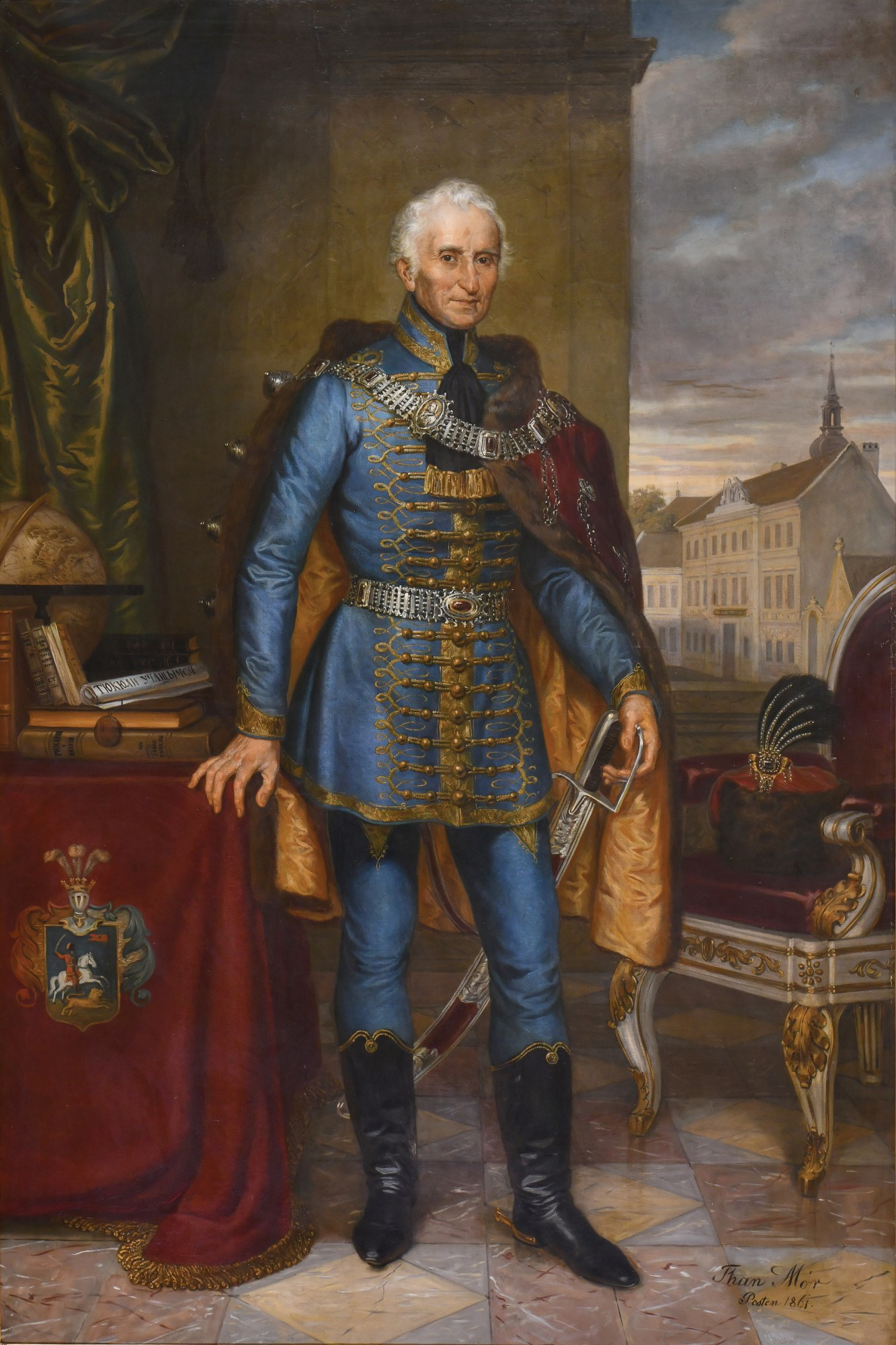
- Native name: Сава Текелија
- Born: Sava Popović Tekelija; 28 August 1761; Arad, Kingdom of Hungary (today Romania)
- Died: 7 October 1842 (aged 81); Pest, Austrian Empire (today Hungary)
- Occupation: Jurist, merchant, philanthropist

Count Sava Popović Tekelija (Serbian: Сава Текелија, Hungarian: Sabba Tököl de Kevermes et Vizes, German: Sava Tököly von Vizes und Kevermes; 28 August 1761 – 7 October 1842) was a Serb nobleman and philanthropist in the Habsburg Realm who was made president of the Matica srpska from 1838 to 1842, after his financial support saved the institution. Tekelija was a key figure in the Serbian national awakening of the early 19th century and a strong advocate of common political interests between Serbs and Hungarians He was elected delegate to the parliaments of both Timișoara and Bratislava.

== Life ==
Born in Arad in the Habsburg monarchy (today in Romania) Tekelija studied at a Serb elementary school, attended Gymnasium in Buda, after which he studied law in Vienna and Budapest. He finished his studies in 1785, and earned his doctor of law (doctor juris) a year later. He was elected lifetime president of Matica srpska in 1838. Tekelija was an outspoken opponent of the language reforms of Vuk Karadžić, which incorporated local dialects, and instead advocated to standardize the Serbian literary language by utilizing Slavonic-Serbian as a template, which he believed to be an elevated form of the language.

In 1838, Tekelija founded the Tekelijanum (Thökölyánum) in Pest, which served as a dormitory and cultural center for Serbian students of limited means. The facility included a library, a museum, and editorial boards for Serbian language newspapers. Tekelija also aligned himself with Hungarian causes, and provided financial support to both the Debrecen Reformed College and the Hungarian Academy of Sciences.

A fierce supporter of the fight for Serbian independence, Tekelija sought to drum up support from the great powers for the burgeoning movement. In 1803, he approached the French delegation in Vienna to advocate for a French-backed South Slavic state in the lands conquered by Napoleon. In 1805, Tekelija wrote a missive to Francis I in an attempt to persuade him to sell Dalmatia and the Bay of Kotor to the new Serbian state and aid the Serbs in their fight against the Ottoman Empire. Tekelija argued that by doing so, Austria would gain a loyal ally among Serbs and simultaneously counter Russian influence in the region.

Tekelija believed in a secular solution for defining the emerging national movements in the Balkans and opposed religious fundamentalism, which he deemed the source of arbitrary ethnic divisions among the Slavic-speaking peoples of the region. A staunch political liberal, Tekelija supported both Hungarian and Serb liberal political movements, though only voiced conditional support for republicanism. Tekelija's reputation as a leader of Serbian cultural revival endured after his death and his legacy was immensely popular among Serbs in the 1860s, earning him the posthumous epithets of the "Great Benefactor" and the "Father of Serbian Youth."

Tekelija was a Knight of the Golden Spur and served as Court Secretary (Hofsekretär) of the Hungarian Court Chancellery from 1792 to 1796.

== See also ==
- Dositej Obradović
- Serbs of Romania
- Serbs of Hungary

Cultural offices
Preceded by Mihailo Jovanović	President of Matica Srpska; 1838–1842	Succeeded by Platon Atanacković
