= List of largest hospital campuses =

This is a list of large hospitals ranked by bed capacity and staffing within a single campus. Bed capacity or hospital capacity is the maximum number of patients the hospital can accommodate at one time. It is affected not only by physical equipment (e.g., the number of beds at the hospital) but also by medical staffing. If the hospital is unable to hire enough nurses and other staff, then the hospital cannot accept patients even if it has the equipment, and vice versa. Similarly, a hospital may have a high overall bed capacity but not have enough capacity in a specialized area, such as ICU bed capacity. Bed capacity differs from bed occupancy, which is the number of patients in the hospital at a given point in time.

Hospital networks that consist of several campuses are not considered as a whole, and statistics from satellite campuses are not included. Campuses that do not have reliable sources may not be included; it is not necessarily a complete list.

== Ranked by capacity ==
This is a list of hospital campuses with a capacity of more than 1,500 beds.

Hospital campus	Town or city	Country	Beds (Year)	Ref
First Affiliated Hospital of Zhengzhou University	Zhengzhou	China	7,000	
King George's Medical University	Lucknow, Uttar Pradesh	India	4,500	
National Center for Mental Health	Mandaluyong	Philippines	4,200	
Ankara Etlik City Hospital	Ankara	Turkey	4,050	
Linkou Chang Gung Memorial Hospital	Taoyuan City	Taiwan	4,000	
Ankara Bilkent City Hospital	Ankara	Turkey	3,810 (2020)	
National Hospital of Sri Lanka	Colombo	Sri Lanka	3,404	
University Clinical Centre of Serbia	Belgrade	Serbia	3,205	
Chris Hani Baragwanath Hospital	Johannesburg	South Africa	3,200	
Qasr El Eyni Hospital	Cairo	Egypt	3,200 (2020)	
Government Medical College, Kozhikode	Kozhikode	India	3,025	
Taipei Veterans General Hospital	Taipei	Taiwan	3,000	
Ahmedabad Civil Hospital	Ahmedabad	India	7,000	
Rajiv Gandhi Government General Hospital	Chennai	India	2,722	
Asan Medical Center	Seoul	South Korea	2,715	
Istanbul Basaksehir City Hospital	Istanbul	Turkey	2,682	
Amrita Hospital	Faridabad	India	2,600	
Government Rajaji Hospital	Madurai	India	2,518	
Hospital das Clínicas da Universidade de São Paulo	São Paulo	Brazil	2,500	
Singapore General Hospital	Outram	Singapore	2,440 (2023) (Note: Includes 1,939 beds in Singapore General Hospital, 185 beds in National Heart Centre Singapore, and 316 beds in Outram Community Hospital)	
Severance Hospital	Seoul	South Korea	2,437	
Motol University Hospital	Prague	Czech Republic	2,410	
National Taiwan University Hospital	Taipei	Taiwan	2,400	
Christian Medical College Vellore	Vellore	India	2,305	
Agostino Gemelli University Policlinic	Rome	Italy	2,300	
Kuala Lumpur Hospital	Kuala Lumpur	Malaysia	2,300	
Dhaka Medical College and Hospital	Dhaka	Bangladesh	2,300	
Jawaharlal Nehru Medical College	Belagavi	India	2,250	
Gandhi Medical College	Hyderabad	India	2,200	
University Medical Center Freiburg	Freiburg im Breisgau	Germany	2,179	
Government Medical College Hospital, Trivandrum	Thiruvananthapuram	India	2,126 (2011)	
Geneva University Hospitals	Geneva	Switzerland	2,083	
Ljubljana University Medical Centre	Ljubljana	Slovenia	2,138	
Tirunelveli Medical College	Tirunelveli	India	2,100	
Mayo Clinic Hospital, Saint Marys Campus	Rochester	United States	2,059	
University Clinical Centre of Vojvodina	Novi Sad	Serbia	2,041	
Dr. Jose N. Rodriguez Memorial Hospital	Caloocan	Philippines	2,000	
UZ Leuven	Leuven	Belgium	1,995	
University Hospital Heidelberg	Heidelberg	Germany	1,991 (2020)	
Samsung Medical Center	Seoul	South Korea	1,979 (2015)	
Tuen Mun Hospital	Tuen Mun, Hong Kong	Hong Kong	1,935 (2017)	
Oslo University Hospital	Oslo	Norway	1,870 (2018)	
Tri-Service General Hospital	Taipei	Taiwan	1,800	
Kenyatta National Hospital	Nairobi	Kenya	1,800	
Lausanne University Hospital	Lausanne	Switzerland	1,548	
University Hospital Graz	Graz	Austria	1,530	
JSS Hospital	Mysore	India	1,800	
Southern Philippines Medical Center	Davao City	Philippines	1,800 (2021)	
Hospital Bahagia, Ulu Kinta	Perak	Malaysia	1,800	
University Hospital Essen	Essen	Germany	1,770 (2019)	
Seoul National University Hospital	Seoul	South Korea	1,761	
Kaunas Clinics	Kaunas	Lithuania	1,760	
Jubilee Mission Medical College & Research Institute	Thrissur	India	1,750	
Vienna General Hospital	Vienna	Austria	1,742 (2022)	
Queen Mary Hospital (Hong Kong)	Hong Kong Island	Hong Kong	1,711	
Augsburg Hospital	Augsburg	Germany	1,737	
Tan Tock Seng Hospital	Novena	Singapore	1,700	
Queen Elizabeth University Hospital	Glasgow	United Kingdom	1,677	
Hospital General Universitario Gregorio Marañón	Madrid	Spain	1,671 (2017)	
Government Mohan Kumaramangalam Medical College	Salem	India	1,642	
Karapitiya Teaching Hospital	Galle	Sri Lanka	1,624	
Edgardo Rebagliati Martins National Hospital	Lima	Peru	1,600 (2019)	
Sheba Medical Center	Ramat Gan	Israel	1,580	
Stanley Medical College	Chennai	India	1,580	
Jackson Memorial Hospital	Miami	United States	1,547 (2021)	
Yale New Haven Hospital	New Haven	United States	1,541 (2021)	
Safdarjung Hospital	New Delhi	India	1,531	
University Clinical Centre of Niš	Niš	Serbia	1,525	
Hannover Medical School	Hanover	Germany	1,520	
Policlinico Sant'Orsola-Malpighi	Bologna	Italy	1,515	
University Hospital Cologne	Cologne	Germany	1,509	
University Medical Center Hamburg-Eppendorf	Hamburg	Germany	1,502	

== Ranked by staff ==
This is a list of hospital campuses with more than 10,000 staff.

Hospital	Town or city	Country	Staff	Ref
Mayo Clinic Hospital, Saint Marys Campus	Rochester	United States	54,000	
Cleveland Clinic (main campus)	Cleveland	United States	31,801 (2019)	
Johns Hopkins Hospital	Baltimore	United States	30,000 (2018)	
Oslo University Hospital	Oslo	Norway	25,123 (2023)	
The Ohio State University Wexner Medical Center	Columbus	United States	25,015 (2020)	
Hospital das Clínicas da Universidade de São Paulo	São Paulo	Brazil	19,000	
Erasmus MC	Rotterdam	Netherlands	18,000 (2024)	
Singapore General Hospital	Outram	Singapore	17,661 (Note: Includes 9,183 staff in Singapore General Hospital, 1,070 staff in SingHealth HQ, 2,509 staff in Duke-NUS Medical School, 1,340 staff in National Cancer Centre Singapore, 557 staff in National Dental Centre Singapore, 1,282 staff in National Heart Centre Singapore, 1,018 staff in Singapore National Eye Centre, 155 staff in SingHealth Community Hospitals HQ, and 547 staff in Outram Community Hospital)	
Sahlgrenska University Hospital	Gothenburg	Sweden	17,000	
University Medical Center Groningen	Groningen	Netherlands	17,000	
Massachusetts General Hospital	Boston	United States	15,000	
Helsinki University Central Hospital	Helsinki	Finland	13,700	
Agostino Gemelli University Policlinic	Rome	Italy	13,000	
Geneva University Hospitals	Geneva	Switzerland	12,788	
Lausanne University Hospital	Lausanne	Switzerland	12,436	
Rigshospitalet	Copenhagen	Denmark	12,000	
Yale New Haven Hospital	New Haven	United States	12,000	
John Radcliffe Hospital (including Oxford Children's Hospital and Oxford Eye Hospital)	Oxford	United Kingdom	11,904	
Royal Stoke University Hospital	Hartshill	United Kingdom	11,354	
University Hospital Heidelberg	Heidelberg	Germany	11,315	
Odense University Hospital	Odense	Denmark	11,281	
Inselspital	Bern	Switzerland	11,000	
Aarhus University Hospital	Aarhus	Denmark	10,200	
Cambridge Biomedical Campus (Addenbrooke's Hospital and the Rosie Hospital)	Cambridge	United Kingdom	10,132	
Queen Elizabeth University Hospital	Glasgow	United Kingdom	10,000	

== See also ==
- Lists of hospitals
- List of largest hospital networks
- List of tallest hospitals
- List of the oldest hospitals in the United States
