= University Clinical Centre of Niš =

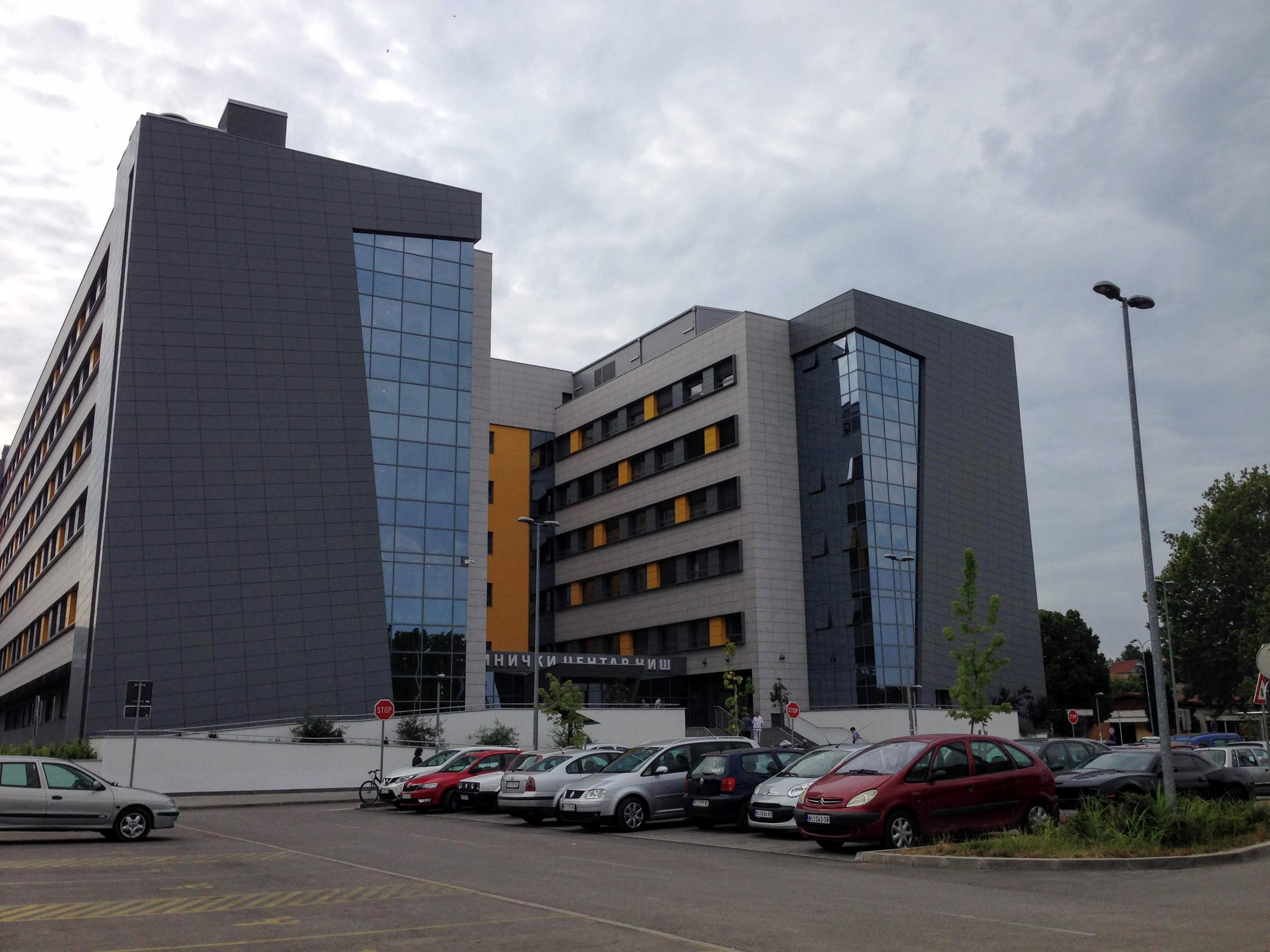

Geography
- Location: Bulevar Zorana Đinđića 48, 18000 Niš, Serbia
- Coordinates: 43°18′56.7″N 21°54′46.6″E

Organisation
- Type: Public; Academic Medical Center
- Affiliated university: University of Niš

Services
- Emergency department: Yes
- Beds: 1,525 (2017)

Helipads
- Helipad: Yes

History
- Founded: 14 November 1990; 35 years ago

Links
- Website: www.kcnis.rs
- Lists: Hospitals in Serbia

The University Clinical Centre of Niš (Serbian: Универзитетски клинички центар у Нишу; abbr. УКЦН / UKCN) is an academic medical centre located in Niš, Serbia. It serves as the main medical centre for both Niš and Southern and Southeastern Serbia.

== History ==
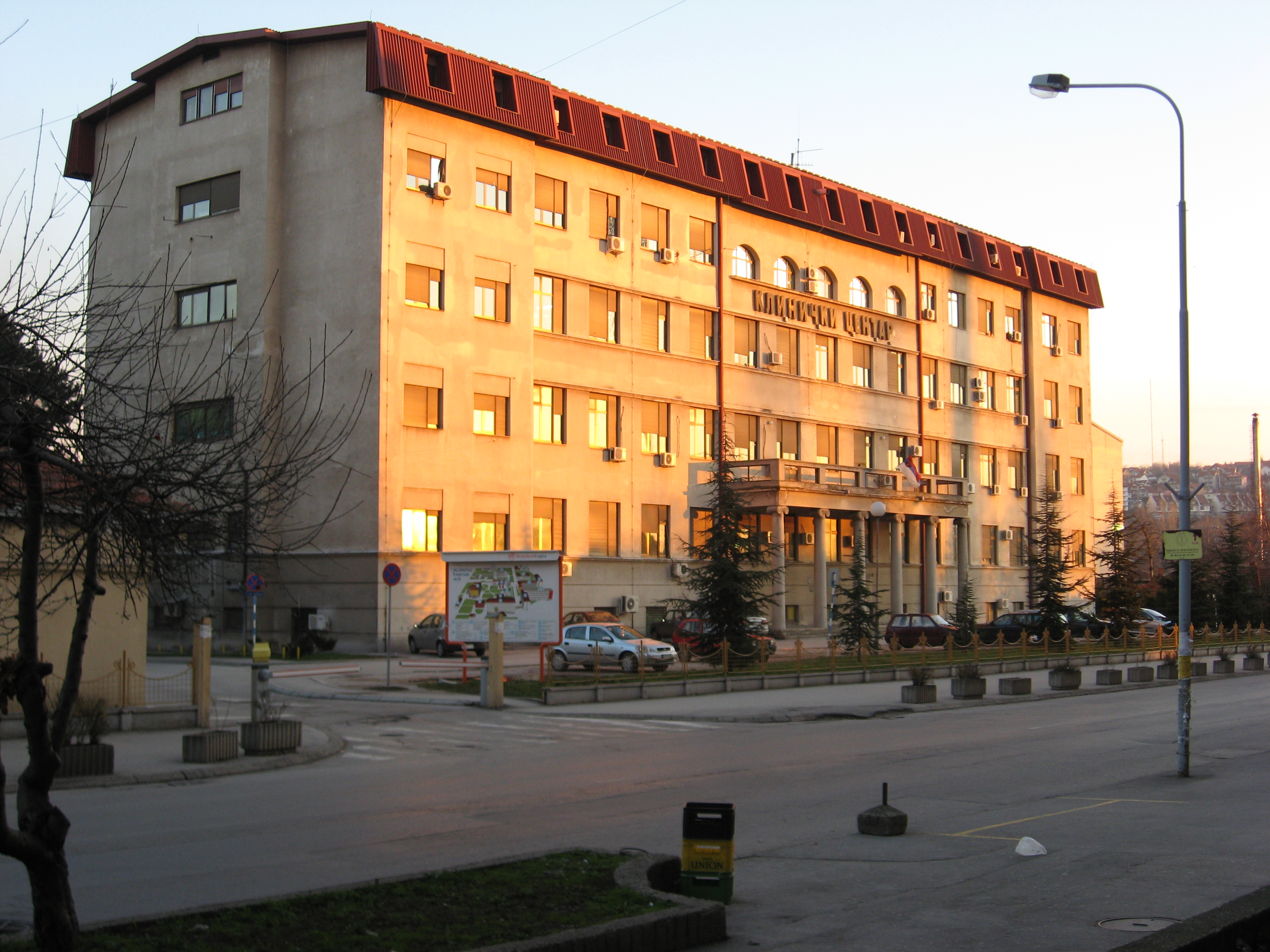
Former main building of the Clinical Centre of Niš

The Clinical Centre of Niš was established on 14 November 1990. It is the second largest hospital in Serbia after Clinical Centre of Serbia (based in Belgrade) and serves more than 2 million people mostly from Southern and Southeastern Serbia.

In December 2017, new main building of the Clinical Centre spreading over 45,000 square meters with surrounding clinics and building was officially opened. The estimated cost of the investment, including the purchase of new medical equipment, stands at 50 million euros.

In January 2018, the Emergency Center moved in new building of the Clinical Centre. In April 2019, a helipad was opened.

In January 2021. Government of Serbia decided that Clinical Centre of Niš will be renamed to University Clinical Centre of Niš, and that it will serve as academic medical centre.

In April 2021, the Emergency Center took the name of its late director, dr Miodrag Lazić who died in red zone of Covid Hospital, during most difficult time of COVID-19 pandemic in Niš.

In 2023, the Clinic for Cardiac Surgery of the UKCN managed to remove the waiting lists under the leadership of its director Dragan Milić.

== Organization ==
The Clinical Centre of Niš contains 28 organisational units, of which 22 are clinics, 3 institution centers other service units. The complex also houses the University of Niš Faculty Of Medicine. As of 2017, the Clinical Centre has a capacity of 1,525 beds and has more than 3,000 employees, of which 745 are doctors and more than 1,500 other medical workers.

Annually, more than half million patients are treated, 55,000 hospitalized and over 75,000 surgeries performed.

== See also ==
- Healthcare in Serbia
- List of hospitals in Serbia
