= Military Medical Academy (Serbia) =

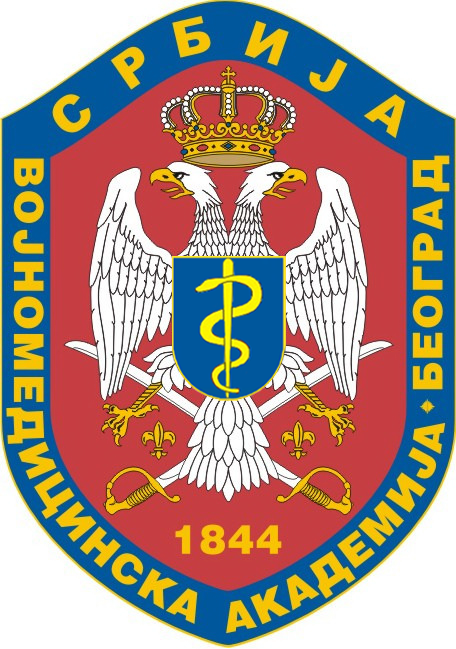

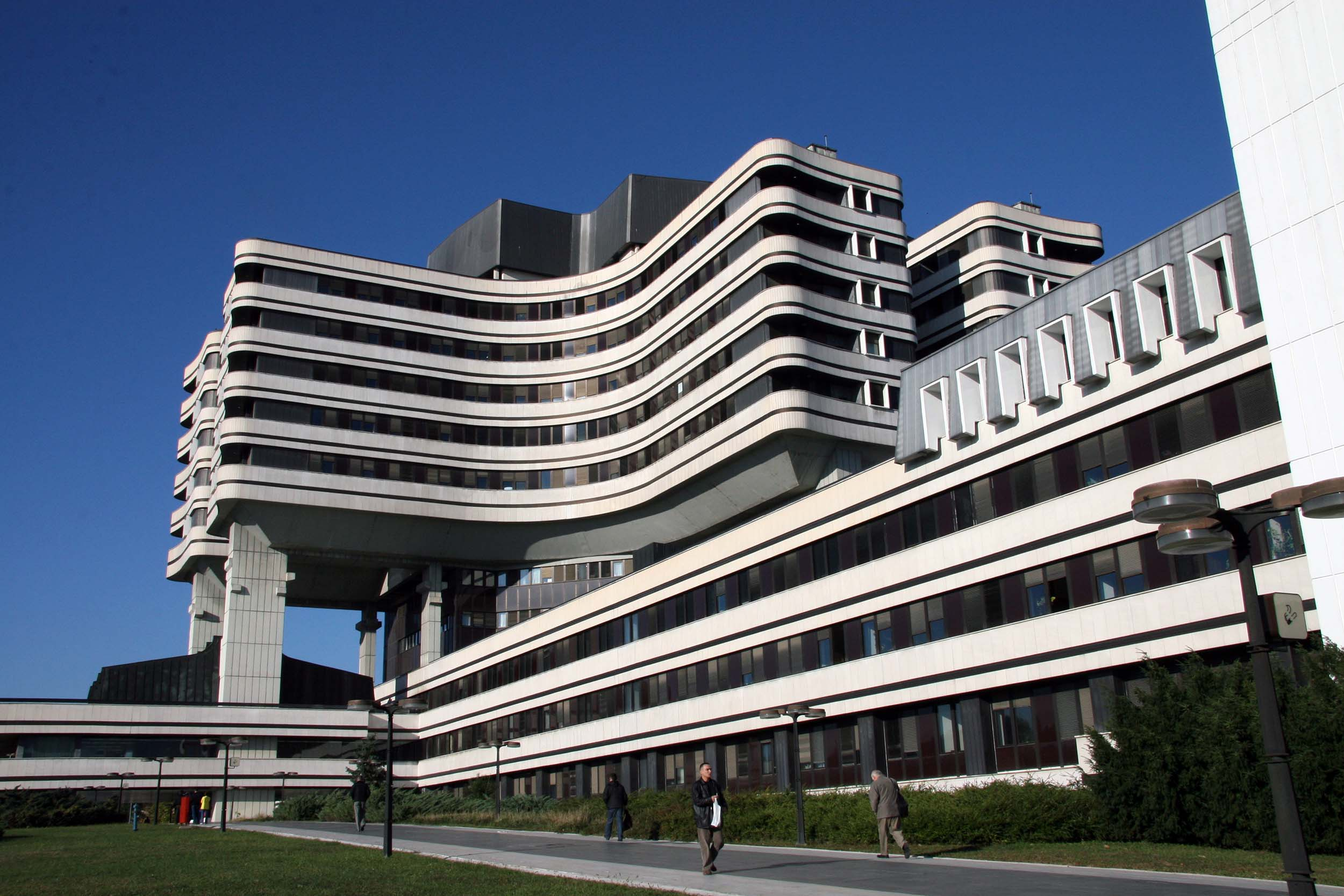

Geography
- Location: Crnotravska 17, Belgrade, Serbia
- Coordinates: 44°45′51.9″N 20°28′01.8″E

Organisation
- Type: Military hospital, academic medical centre
- Affiliated university: University of Defence

Services
- Beds: 1,200 (2018)

Helipads
- Helipad: Yes

History
- Founded: 2 March 1844; 182 years ago

Links
- Website: www.vma.mod.gov.rs
- Lists: Hospitals in Serbia

The Military Medical Academy (Serbian: Војномедицинска академија, ВМА, romanized: Vojnomedicinska akademija, VMA), is a military hospital and academic medical centre in Belgrade, Serbia.

Founded in 1844, it is a part of the Serbian Ministry of Defence and is generally intended to serve the personnel of the Serbian Armed Forces and Ministry of Defence, although it is open for civilians as well. It is known for its high standard in medical practice and is generally considered to be among the best medical institution in the country. In 2011, Medical School of Military Medical Academy is formed as part of the newly established University of Defence.

== History ==
The Military Medical Academy was founded on 2 March 1844. On that day, Prince Alexander Karađorđević signed a decree establishing the first "Central Military Hospital" on the foundations of the military hospital in Belgrade.

In 1909 began the construction of a new building of the "General Military Hospital". with 400 beds available, in Vračar. It was planned to be the most advanced hospital in the Balkans.

The hospital, changed its name once again into the "Main Military Hospital" in 1930. It operated under the Health Department of the Defence Ministry of the Kingdom of Yugoslavia.

In 1949, the hospital was renamed to the "Military Medical Academy", the name it bears to this date. In 1960, the Parliament of Yugoslavia passed an "Act on the Military Medical Academy as the top military medical, educational and medical research institution", which further contoured its supreme status in health system of Serbia and then Yugoslavia.

In 1982, after five years of construction, the Military Medical Academy moved into new medical complex, one of the largest in Europe and the largest single hospital edifice in Serbia.

In 2007, under the agreement between the Ministry of Defence and the Ministry of Health, the Military Medical Academy was functionally integrated into the national health system thus providing health care to civilians also.

In 2011, the Military Medical Academy became integral part of newly established University of Defence, together with Military Academy.

Annually, with 1,200 beds available, about 35,000 patients are hospitalized, about 20,000 surgical interventions are made and more than half a million specialist examinations are performed.

== Building ==
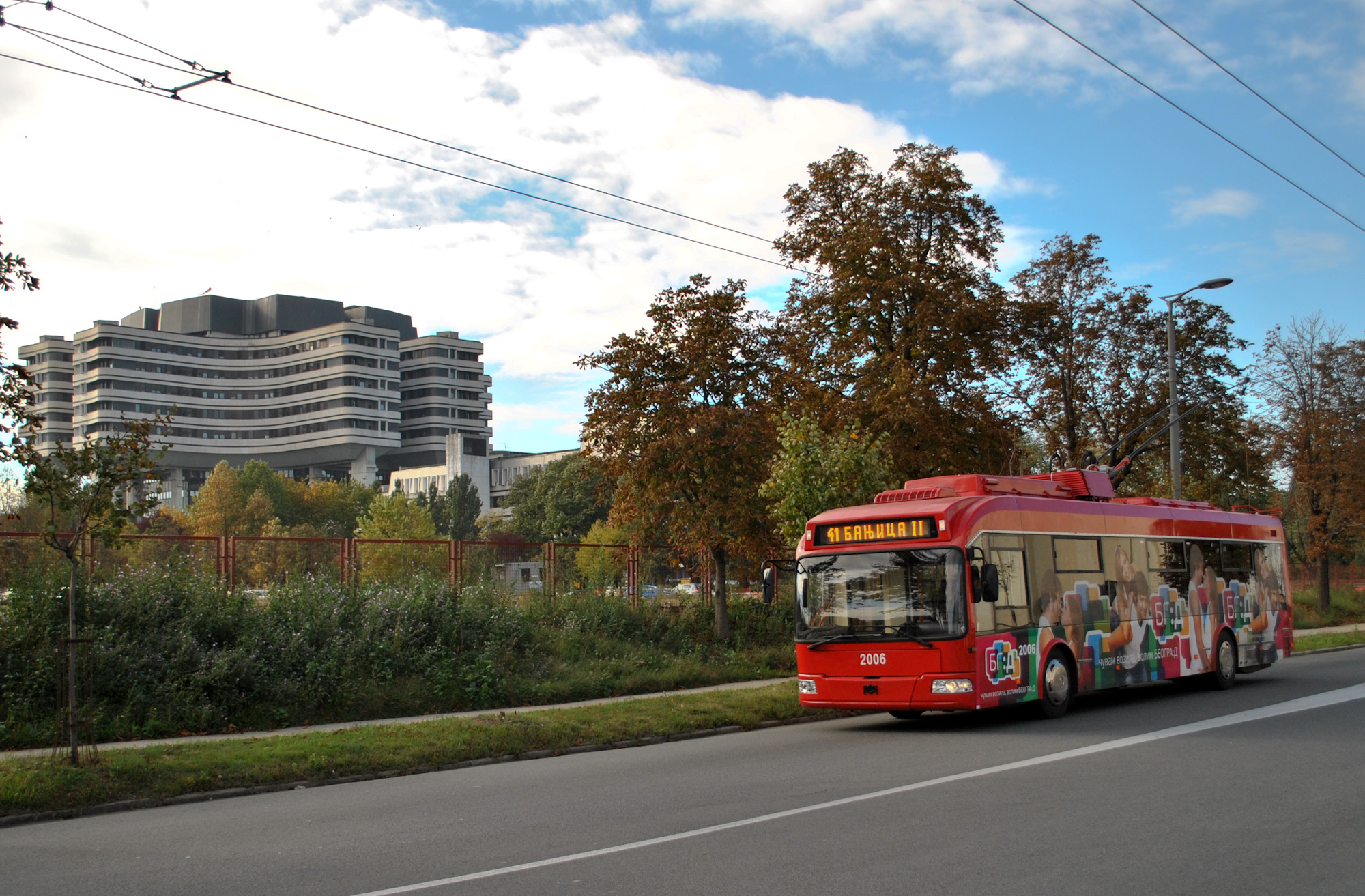
Military Medical Academy

Located on the Banjica hill area of Belgrade, the Military Medical Academy complex covers the area of 21 hectares (52 acres).

It was designed by the award-winning architects Colonel Josip Osojnik and Slobodan Nikolić. Their project won the competition in 1973. The construction was finished in 1981 and the hospital officially moved into a new building and began operations on 1 January 1982.

The hospital building itself is a 14-story building covering 180,000 square meters of space and divided in more than 60 different technical-technological units, which makes it the biggest single hospital edifice in Serbia.

== Awards and recognitions ==
The Military Medical Academy bears many decorations, awards, recognitions and letters of thanks of which the most significant are the following:

Awards

- Order of St. Sava, first order
- Order of Brotherhood and Unity with the gold wreath granted by the Presidency of Yugoslavia (1990)
- Medal of Republika Srpska (1993)
- Medal of Nikola Tesla, first order
- Medal of Republika Srpska, sash (2013)
- Order of Karađorđe's Star, third order (2014)

Recognitions

- Superbrand of Serbia in the Health & Beauty domain (2007)
- The Best of Serbia award by the Economy Chamber of the Republic of Serbia
- The Best Corporative Brand in the field of medicine and health care by the Economic Review and the Ministry of Trade and Services
- "22nd December" prize for architecture of the hospital complex

== Chiefs ==
No.	Portrait	Name	Term of office	Military
Principality of Serbia
1		Karlo Beloni	1844–1873	Armed Forces of the Principality of Serbia
2		Josif Holec	1873–1882	Armed Forces of the Principality of Serbia
Kingdom of Serbia
2		Josif Holec	1882–1884	Royal Serbian Army
3		Dimitrije Gerasimović	1884–1902	Royal Serbian Army
4		Svetozar Arsenijević	1902–1909	Royal Serbian Army
5		Roman Sondermajer	1909–1912	Royal Serbian Army
Kingdom of Yugoslavia
6		Čedomir Đurđević	1920–1922	Royal Yugoslav Army
7		Sima Karaganović	1922–1930	Royal Yugoslav Army
8		Sava Popović	1930–1933	Royal Yugoslav Army
9		Žarko Trpković	1933–1934	Royal Yugoslav Army
10		Milan Dimitrijević	1934–1936	Royal Yugoslav Army
11		Đorđe Protić	1936–1939	Royal Yugoslav Army
12		Vojislav Popović	1939–1941	Royal Yugoslav Army
SFR Yugoslavia
13		Ivica Pavletić	1944–1945	Yugoslav People's Army
14		Vojislav K. Stojanović	1945	Yugoslav People's Army
15		Vojislav Dulić	1945–1949	Yugoslav People's Army
16		Herbert Kraus	1949–1953	Yugoslav People's Army
17		Salomon Levi	1953–1954	Yugoslav People's Army
(16)		Herbert Kraus	1954–1956	Yugoslav People's Army
18		Ivo Kralj	1956–1958	Yugoslav People's Army
19		Tomislav Kronja	1959–1971	Yugoslav People's Army
20		Đorđe Dragić	1971–1979	Yugoslav People's Army
21		Borivoj Vračarić	1979–1982	Yugoslav People's Army
22		Vladimir Vojvodić	1982–1988	Yugoslav People's Army
23		Mihajlo Đuknić	1989–1992	Yugoslav People's Army
Serbia and Montenegro
24		Jovan Bjelić	1992–1996	Armed Forces of Serbia and Montenegro
25		Aco Jovičić	1996–2001	Armed Forces of Serbia and Montenegro
26		Momčilo Krgović	2001–2002	Armed Forces of Serbia and Montenegro
27		Zoran Stanković	2002–2005	Armed Forces of Serbia and Montenegro
28		Miodrag Jevtić	2005–2006	Armed Forces of Serbia and Montenegro
Republic of Serbia
28		Miodrag Jevtić	2006–2011	Serbian Armed Forces
29		Marijan Novaković	2011–2014	Serbian Armed Forces
–		Zoran Šegrt (Acting)	2014–2016	Serbian Armed Forces
–		Dragan Dinčić (Acting)	2016–2017	Serbian Armed Forces
30		Miroslav Vukosavljević	2017–2024	Serbian Armed Forces
31		Nenad Perišić	2024–present	Serbian Armed Forces

== See also ==
- Healthcare in Serbia
- List of hospitals in Serbia
