= University Hospital Center Dr Dragiša Mišović =

University Hospital Center Dr Dragiša Mišović Dedinje

Geography
- Location: Heroja Milana Tepića 1, Belgrade, Serbia
- Coordinates: 44.78°N 20.46°E

Organisation
- Care system: Public
- Type: Clinical
- Affiliated university: University of Belgrade

Services
- Emergency department: Yes
- Beds: 546 (2017)

History
- Opened: 1930; 96 years ago

Links
- Website: www.dragisamisovic.bg.ac.rs
- Lists: Hospitals in Serbia

University Hospital Center Dr Dragiša Mišović (Serbian: Клиничко-болнички центар Др Драгиша Мишовић-Дедиње, romanized: Kliničko-bolnički centar Dr Dragiša Mišović-Dedinje) or Clinical Hospital Center Dr Dragiša Mišović Dedinje, is a health facility of secondary level in Belgrade, that performs specialist health care in its hospitals and clinics.

It is based on modern principles of health care. It serves as a teaching facility of the University of Belgrade School of Medicine. It was established in 1930, and it is named after Dragiša Mišović, a pre–World War II communist and doctor.

== History ==
In the 1920s, Society of Young Women Doctors gained a place near Dedinje from Đorđe Vajfert. In 1930, by architectural design of Živan Nikolić, was built an object designed for Belgrade mistress' rest (today's Children Hospital for Pulmonary Diseases and Tuberculosis).

On 24 October 2009, a great fire accident occurred in central building of the Hospital Center, which interrupted hospital operations. Regardless, the main services are still active in emergency circumstances.

== See also ==
- Healthcare in Serbia
- List of hospitals in Serbia
