= Tour to Strasbourg =

2025 Serbian cycling protest to Strasbourg

Tour de Strasbourg
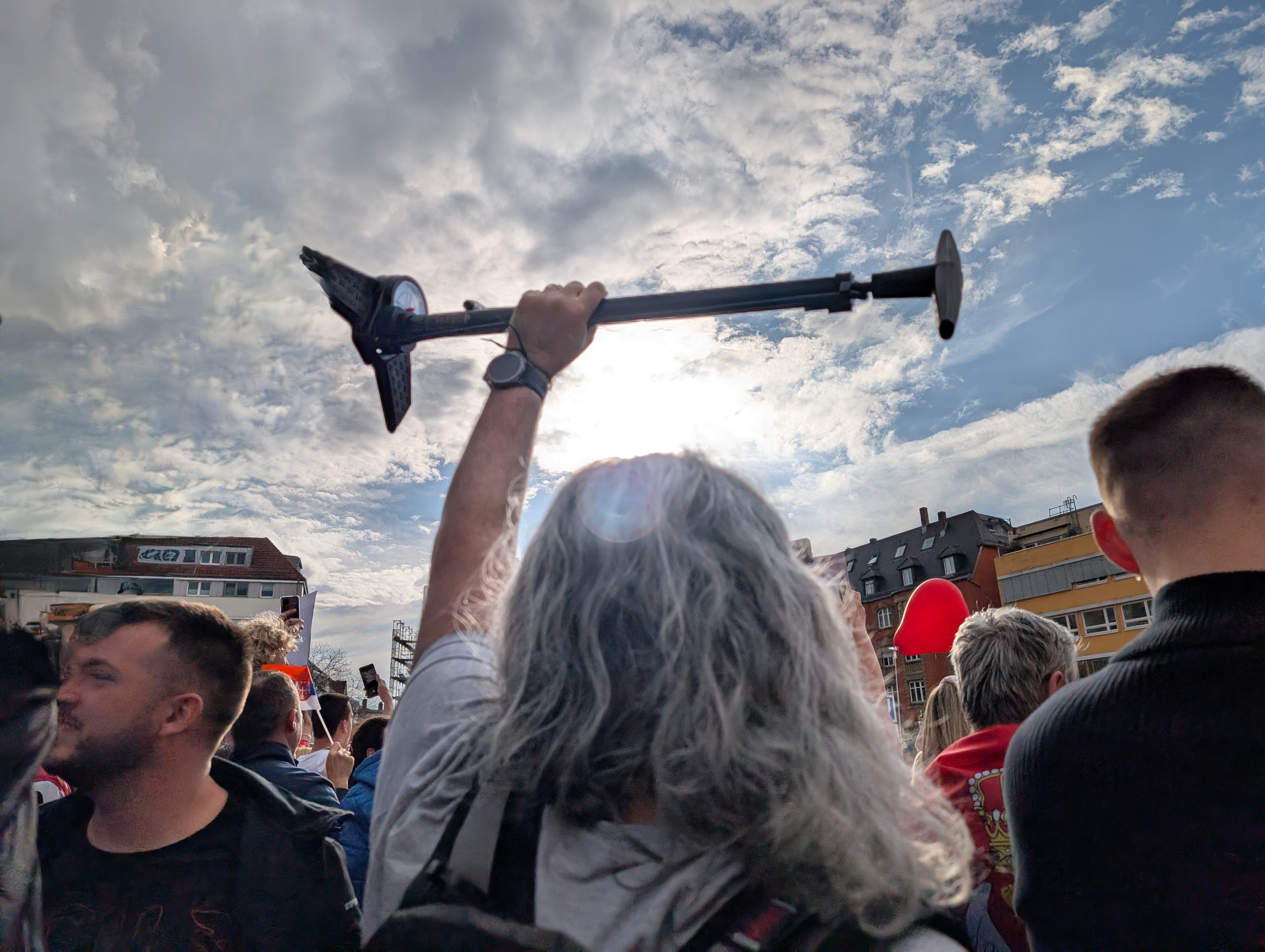

Race details
- Date: April 3–15, 2025.
- Region: Serbia, Hungary, Slovakia, Austria, Germany, France
- Local name(s): Тура до Стразбура, Tura do Strazbura
- Discipline: Road
- Organiser: Serbian students in blockades
- Web site: tourdestrasbourg.com

The Tour to Strasbourg is a protest cycling action by students from Serbia who travelling from Novi Sad to Strasbourg, the seat of the Council of Europe. The Council of Europe was founded in 1949 with the aim of protecting human rights, democracy and the rule of law, and is home to the European Court of Human Rights.

== Background ==
The students' led blockades in Serbia began in protest of the attacks on students that occurred during the 15-minute silence protest due to the collapse of a canopy in Novi Sad on November 1, 2024, which killed 16 people and children, and the inaction of Serbian institutions, their irregularities and corruption. The railway station was built in 1964, while the renovation was completed in 2024, the same year when the collapse occurred, which indicates numerous irregularities in the works and in the system itself. The students in the blockade organized numerous large protests in Novi Sad, Kragujevac, Niš and one of the largest protests ever in Belgrade, the capital city of Serbia. They walked for months to the mentioned cities, passing through less populous places, and some rode bicycles.

They cite the violation of human rights and the lack of reaction from the competent institutions to date as the reason for the cycling action to Strasbourg. Their mission, they say, is "for the world to learn the truth about Serbia", as well as for European institutions to react and put pressure on the Serbian authorities. They also want to attract the attention of the world's media, establish international student cooperation with students from University cities they pass through, and "show perseverance in the fight for justice."

== Cycling tour plan ==
The itinerary includes a departure from Novi Sad on April 3, 24 hours before Students' Day, celebrated yearly in Serbia, and then a final arrival in Strasbourg on April 15, 2025. The eighty students plan to pass through cities such as Subotica, Budapest, Linz, Munich, and a special welcome is expected in Vienna due to the Serbian diaspora. The students will travel over 100 kilometres per day, with a total of over 1,400 kilometres. Namely, the plan is to submit documents and reports on human rights violations in Serbia to the Council of Europe. In addition, they will address the European Union, the European Parliament, the European Commission, the Directorate General for Democracy and Human Dignity, and the EU Agency for Fundamental Rights. Students shared information that they had been contacted by members of the European Parliament who expressed their willingness to welcome the students.

The students are accompanied by traffic police, a car that will be in front of them, and a pacemaker-cyclist who has the duty to dictate the pace, as well as several domestic and foreign media. They are also accompanied by a van with supplies and a team of doctors from the Faculty of Medicine of the University of Novi Sad and the Clinical Center of Vojvodina.

A fifth of the total number of cyclists are girls, and the majority are students of the Faculty of Sport and Physical Education, who have already had similar tours to Serbian cities. Among them are representatives of the Universities of Novi Sad, Belgrade, Niš and Kragujevac. The president of the Bar Association of Vojvodina, Vladimir Beljanski, TV Nova reporter Radovan Seratlić and a high school students from Sombor and Vrbas are also participating with the students. To check the physical fitness of the participants, test rides were held in various cities in Serbia.

Citizens collected donations for cyclists, initially the money was given in cash exclusively to the Rectorate of the University of Novi Sad, and then a bank account was opened. A special donation campaign called Wheels for Wheels was carried out by the Serbian bikers and farmers.
