= Clinic for abdominal and endocrine surgery, Novi Sad =

Historic hospital building in Novi Sad, Serbia

Coordinates: 45°14′59″N 19°49′24″E

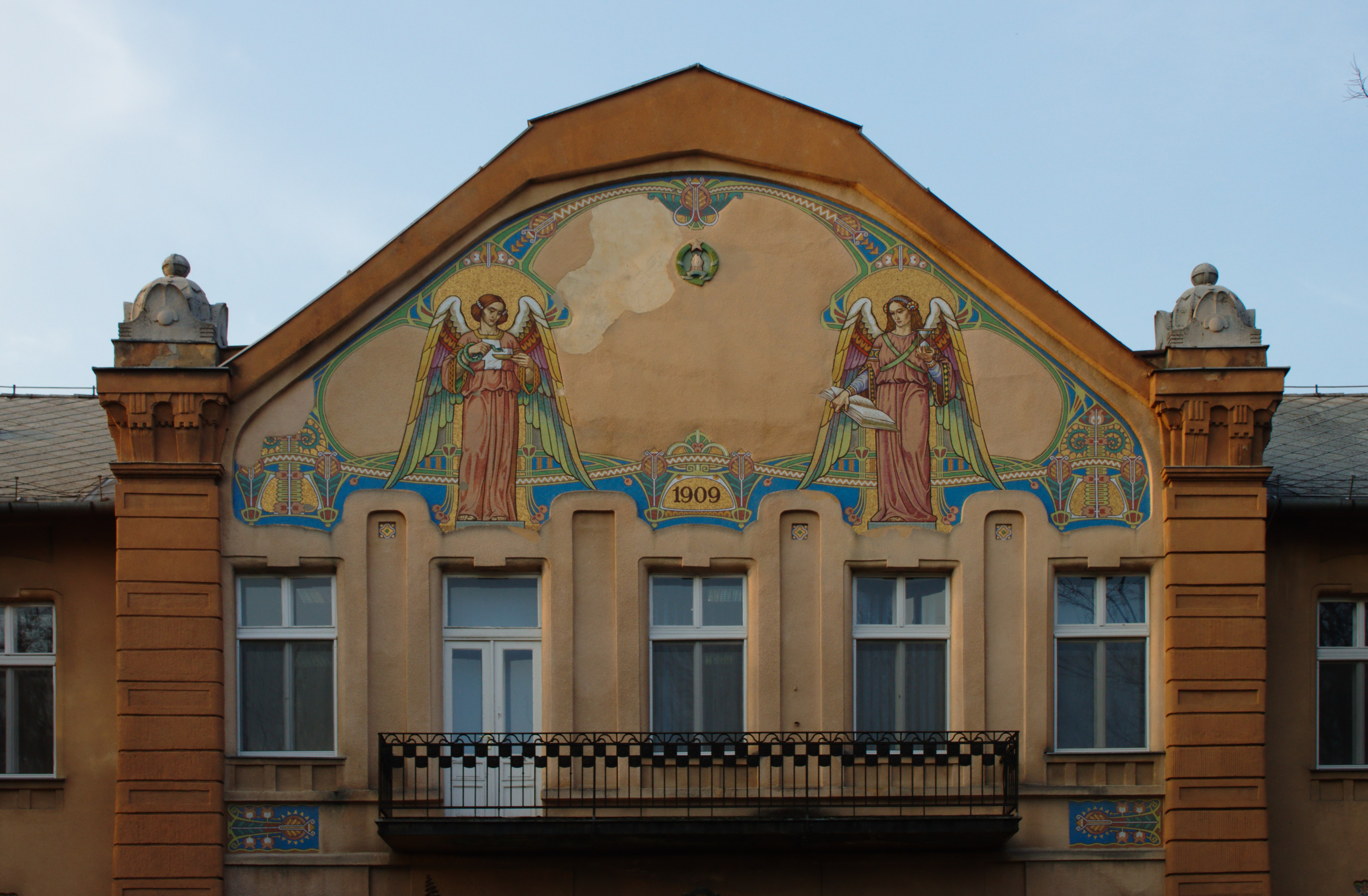
- Street-facing façade of the former administrative building, now part of the University Clinical Center of Vojvodina

General information
- Status: In use
- Type: Hospital administration building
- Architectural style: Hungarian Szecesszió (Art Nouveau)
- Location: Novi Sad, Serbia, Futoški put / Hajduk Veljkova Street
- Current tenants: Medical departments of the University Clinical Center of Vojvodina
- Completed: 1909
- Client: City of Novi Sad
- Owner: University Clinical Center of Vojvodina

Design and construction
- Architect: György Kopeczek

Clinic for abdominal and endocrine surgery of Novi Sad is a historic hospital building in Novi Sad, Serbia. Constructed between 1907 and 1909 as Pavilion 1 of the Novi Sad City Hospital, also historically referred to as the Great City Hospital, it served as the administrative and admitting center of the city's first modern municipal hospital. The building forms part of the original pavilion-style hospital complex that later developed into the University Clinical Center of Vojvodina.

== Location ==
The former administrative building remains one of the historically significant surviving structures of the original Novi Sad City Hospital complex. It stands within the present-day campus of the University Clinical Center of Vojvodina in the Hajduk Veljkova and Futoški put area of Novi Sad and continues to serve medical functions as part of the larger hospital system.

== History ==
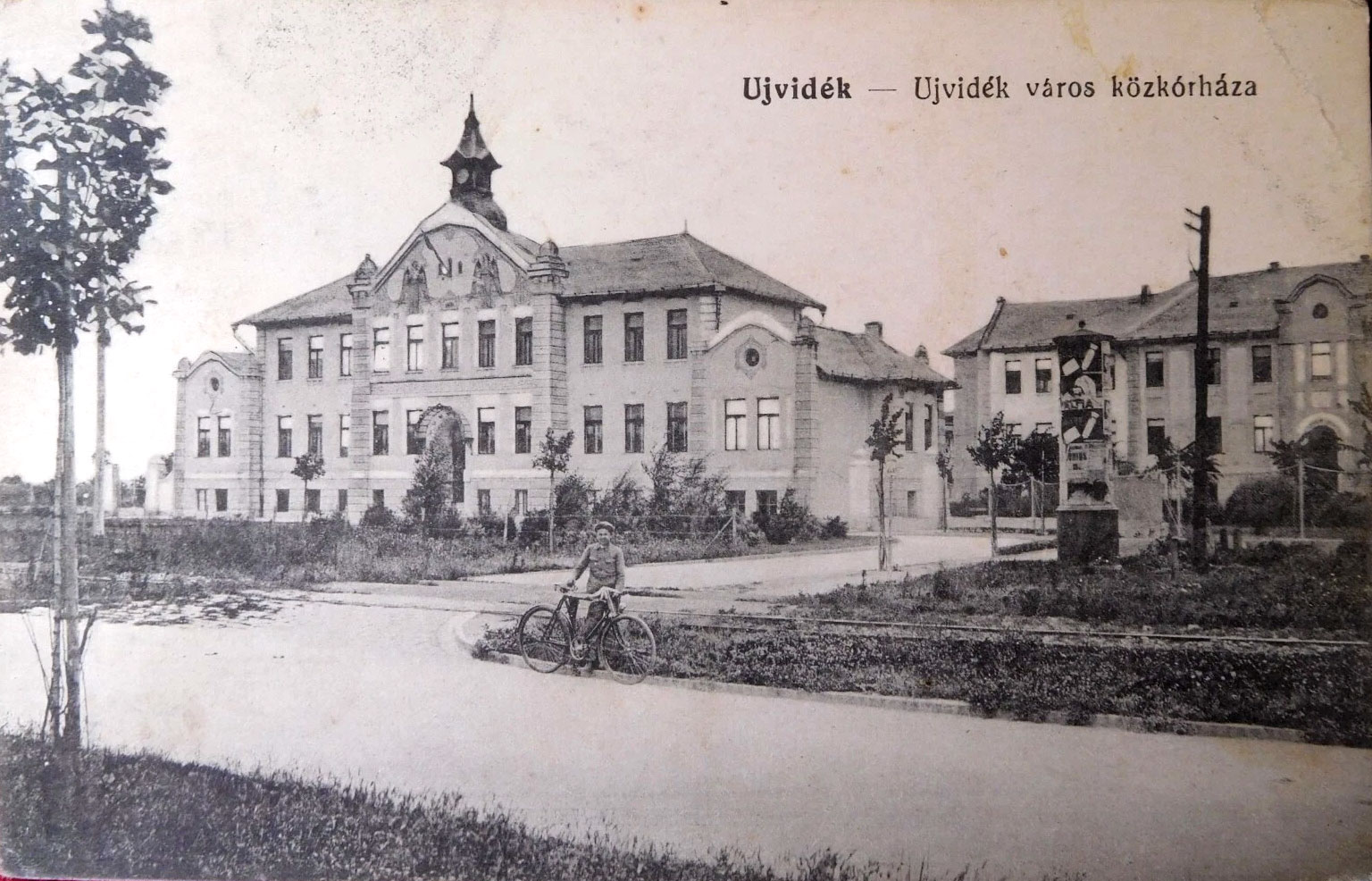
Postcard from 1909 showing the Great City Hospital of Novi Sad shortly after completion, with the central administrative building visible

At the beginning of the 20th century, Novi Sad had approximately 28,000 inhabitants and lacked a modern hospital facility. In response, municipal authorities approved the construction of a new city hospital complex on the outskirts of the city, near the Artesian Bath (later associated with the Jodna Banja area) and the Calvary. Construction began in 1907 and was completed at the end of 1909.

The hospital complex was designed by Budapest architect György Kopeczek (1864–1920), while construction was carried out by Novi Sad builders Vilmos Linarich and Béla Peklo (1867–1960). The complex was conceived as a modern pavilion-style hospital with an initial capacity of approximately 300 beds.

Pavilion 1, later known as the administrative building, housed the admitting department, hospital administration, and management. It was positioned as the central and most prominent structure of the complex, facing what is today Futoška Street. Other pavilions included surgical and gynecological departments (Pavilion 2) and internal medicine and related services (Pavilion 3).

During the First World War, the hospital was converted into a military medical facility for wounded soldiers and patients suffering from infectious diseases, including typhoid fever and influenza. After 1921, the institution became the General State Hospital, later known as the Main Provincial Hospital.

Following the Second World War, the hospital complex entered a period of expansion and specialization in socialist Yugoslavia. In 1963, it formally became a Clinical Hospital, serving as a teaching base for the newly established University of Novi Sad Faculty of Medicine. Through subsequent institutional reorganizations, the complex evolved into the modern Clinical Center of Vojvodina (today officially the University Clinical Center of Vojvodina).

== Architecture ==
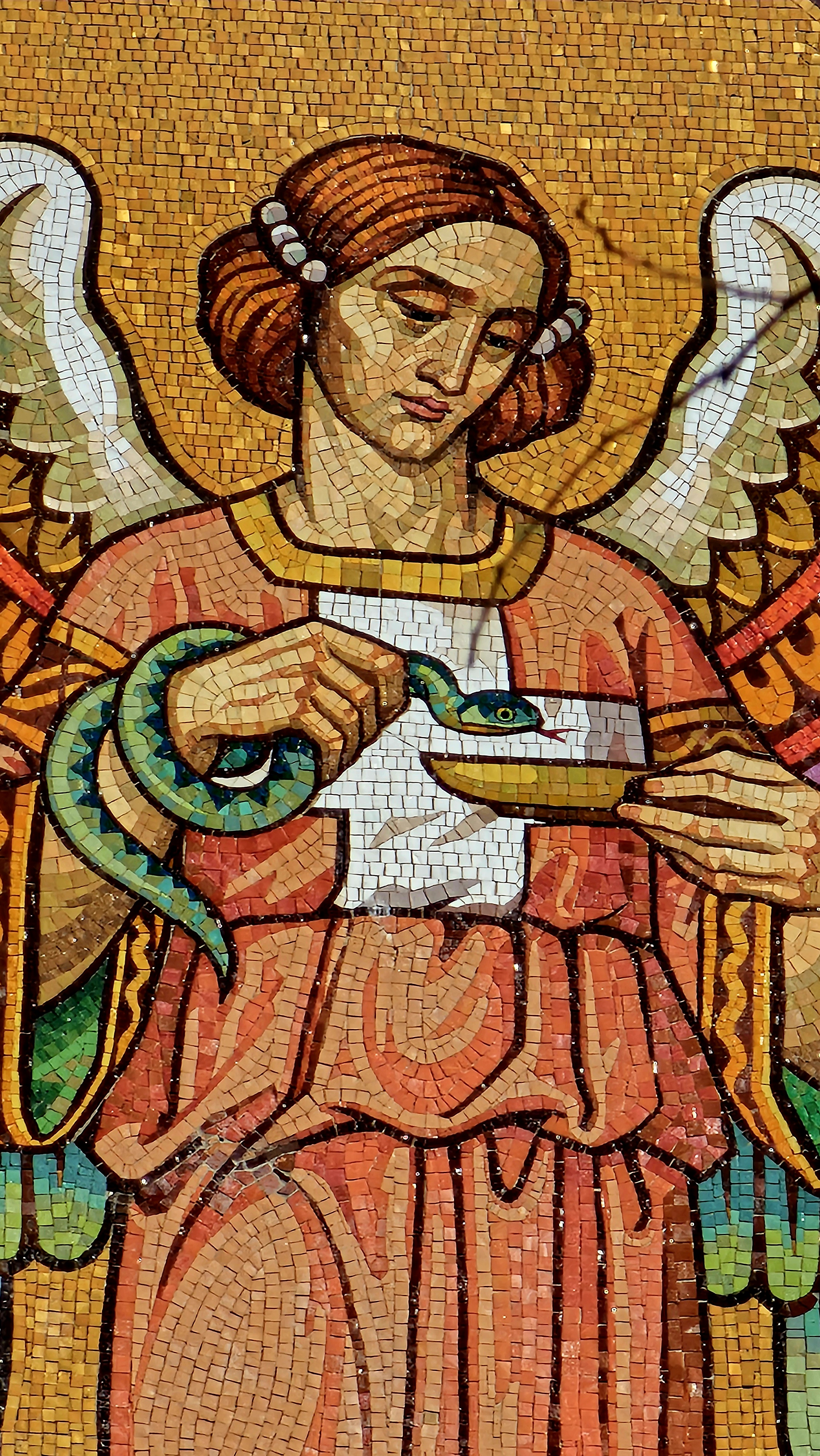
Detail of the façade mosaic showing a female angelic figure holding a bowl with a coiled snake, a symbol associated with medicine and healing

The former administrative building was designed in the Hungarian Szecesszió (Art Nouveau) style characteristic of Central European public architecture in the early 20th century. Its symmetrical street-facing façade emphasized civic importance and institutional authority, with landscaped grounds originally placed between the building and the roadway to reduce noise and improve conditions for patients.

Historical sources note that a clock tower visible in early images of the building was removed in the mid-20th century, although the precise reason for its removal has not been conclusively documented.

The main façade of the building features a monumental mosaic composition dated 1909, positioned above the central entrance and forming part of the original Secession-style decorative program. The mosaic depicts two female angelic figures flanking the year of completion, visually emphasizing the hospital's civic and symbolic role.

A detailed iconographic analysis published in 2019 identifies one of the mosaic figures as Hygeia, the personification of health in classical antiquity, shown holding a bowl with a coiled snake, an established symbol of medicine and pharmacy. The opposing figure is holding an hourglass and a Bible, interpreted as a Christian moral allegory emphasizing the transience of earthly life and the eternal value of the soul. The composition is understood as a deliberate synthesis of classical medical symbolism and Christian ethical themes, characteristic of early 20th-century hospital architecture in Central Europe. The same study does not identify the artist or workshop responsible for the execution of the mosaic. Such imagery aligns with iconographic motifs commonly employed in Central European hospital architecture of the period, where allegorical female figures represented protection, charity, and healing rather than specific named religious or mythological figures.

No reliable published source has identified the artist or workshop responsible for the execution of the mosaic.

== See also ==
- University Clinical Center of Vojvodina
