= University Clinical Centre of Kragujevac =

University Clinical Centre of Kragujevac Универзитетски Клинички Центар Крагујевац

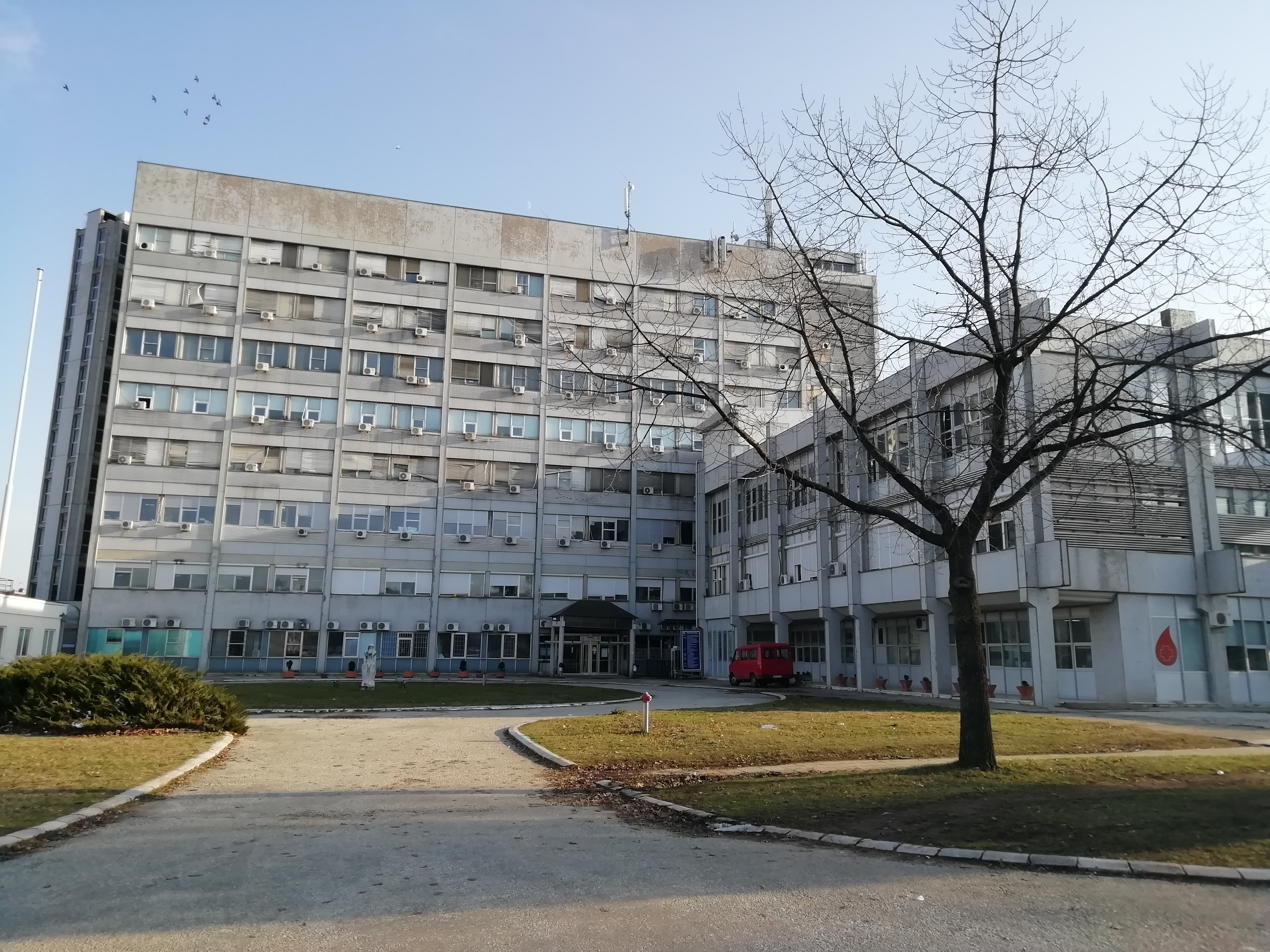
- University Clinical Centre of Kragujevac, main building

Geography
- Location: Zmaj Jovina 30, 34000 Kragujevac, Serbia
- Coordinates: 44°01′12.5″N 20°54′54.5″E

Organisation
- Type: Public; Academic Medical Center
- Affiliated university: University of Kragujevac

Services
- Emergency department: Yes
- Beds: 1,118 (2017)

Helipads
- Helipad: No

History
- Founded: 3 March 2005; 21 years ago

Links
- Website: www.ukck.rs
- Lists: Hospitals in Serbia

The University Clinical Centre of Kragujevac (Serbian: УниверзитетскиКлинички Центар Крагујевац; abbr. УКЦК / UKCK) is a medical centre located in Kragujevac, Serbia. It serves as the main medical centre for both Kragujevac and Šumadija and Western Serbia.

== History ==
The University Clinical Centre of Kragujevac was established on 3 March 2005. It is one of four medical centers in Serbia and serves more than 2 million people mostly from Šumadija and Western Serbia.

== Organization ==
The University Clinical Centre of Kragujevac contains 37 organizational units, of which 15 are clinics, 7 centers and 15 service units. The complex also houses the University of Kragujevac Faculty Of Medicine. As of 2017, the Clinical Centre has a capacity of 1,118 beds and has more than 2,200 employees.

== See also ==
- Healthcare in Serbia
- List of hospitals in Serbia
