= Health in Serbia =

Serbia ranked 65th in the world in life expectancy in 2018 with 73.3 years for men and 78.5 years for women. As of 2018, it had a low infant mortality rate (4.86 per 1,000 live births). As of 2017, it had 2.96 practicing physicians (not including Kosovo) per 1,000 people.

With 14.55 deaths per 1,000 persons, Serbia is among the world's ten countries with the highest mortality rate.

The Human Rights Measurement Initiative finds that Serbia is fulfilling 71.3% of what it should be fulfilling for the right to health based on its level of income. When looking at the right to health with respect to children, Serbia achieves 99.4% of what is expected based on its current income. In regards to the right to health amongst the adult population, the country achieves 91.8% of what is expected based on the nation's level of income. Serbia falls into the "very bad" category when evaluating the right to reproductive health because the nation is fulfilling only 22.7% of what the nation is expected to achieve based on the resources (income) it has available.

== History ==
The Institute of Public Health of Serbia was first established in 1919, when it was called the Ministerial Commission for Epidemiology. In 1945, it was called the Central Institute of Hygiene and encompassed the Federal Institute of Hygiene, the Institute of Epidemiology, and the Institute of Bacteriology and Epidemiology. It changed its name to the Institute of Public Health of Serbia in 2006.

== Statistics ==
=== Health care overview ===
As of 2014, the expenditure on health care in Serbia was 10.37% of GDP in 2014, US$1,312 per capita. Also, as of 2014, Serbia had 308 doctors per 100,000 people (360 per 100,000 people was European Union (EU) average), 628 non-doctoral medical staff per 100,000 people (1,199 per 100,000 people was EU average). Although there is a trend of decreasing number of hospital beds per 100,000 people in Europe due to better efficiency and diagnostics, Serbia is among the leading countries in Europe with 552 hospital beds per 100,000 people. In terms of the availability of medical equipment, Serbia is slightly trailing behind the average of EU countries.

=== Health metrics ===
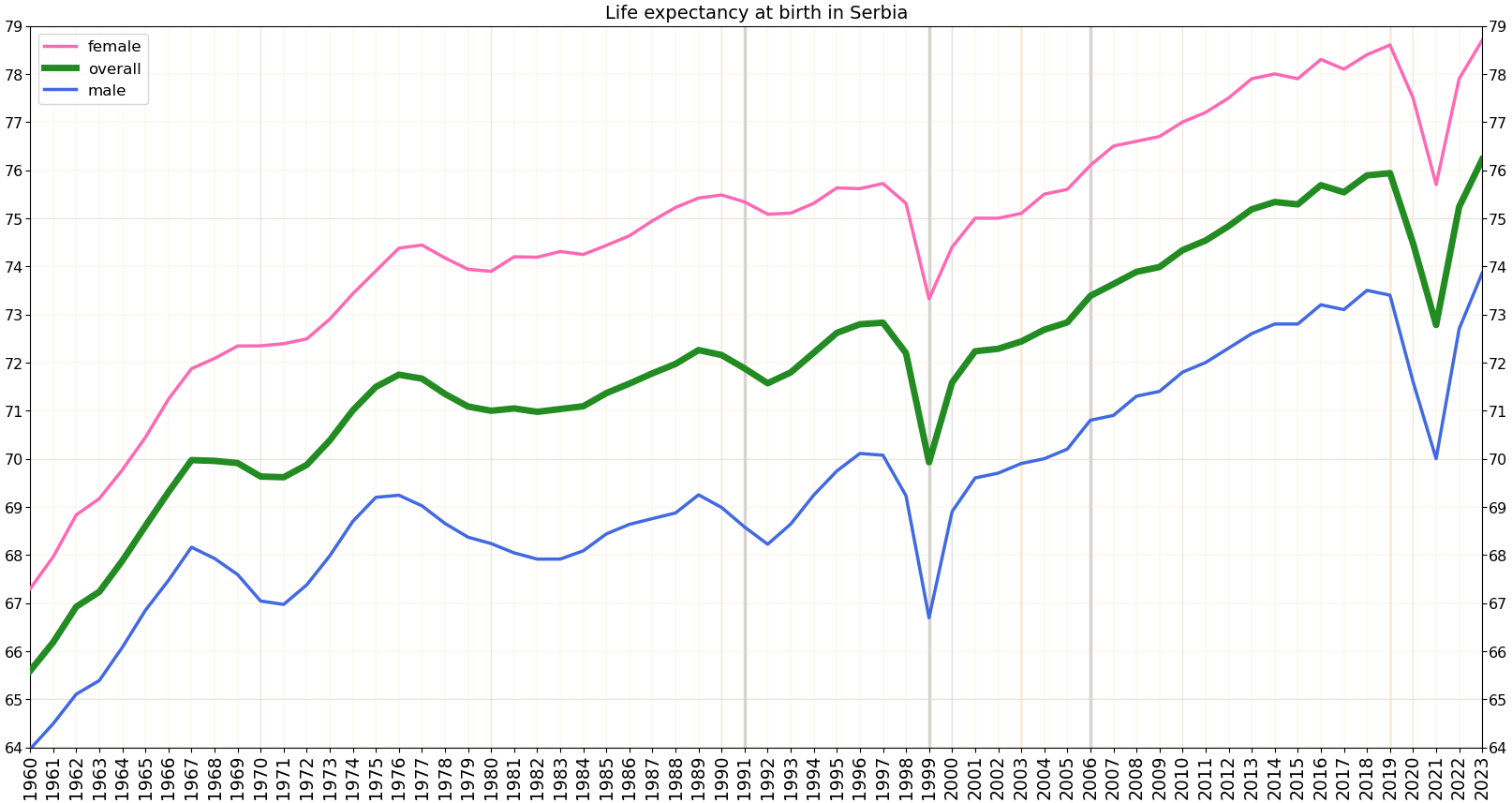
Life expectancy at birth in Serbia

The life expectancy rate in 2018 stood at 73.22 years for men and 78.08 for women. With 14.55 deaths per 1,000 persons, Serbia is among the world's ten countries with the highest mortality rate. As of 2018, the infant mortality stood at 4.86 deaths per 1,000 live births. There is decreasing linear trend over the decades, as in 1950 that number stood at 118.11, in 1970 it was at 56.26, in 1990 it was at 10.64, in 2010 it was at 6.73 deaths per 1,000 live births.

The leading causes of death are chronic non-communicable diseases. As of 2018, a total of 101,655 people died in Serbia, of which 23,922 (23.5%) were 85 years or older, followed by 20,315 (20%) that were in age group of 80-84 and 15,331 (15.1%) that were in age group of 75–79 years old.

As of 2018, the leading cause of death were diseases of cardiovascular system with 52,663 (51.8%) deaths, followed by neoplasms (tumors) with 22,084 (21.7%) deaths. Other causes of death were diseases of respiratory system with 5,250 (5.2%) deaths, group of endocrine, nutritional and metabolic diseases with 3,324 (3.3%) deaths, diseases of the digestive system with 3,204 (3.2%) deaths.

As of 2018, a total of 2,806 people died by violence, of which 2,065 (73.6%) were men and 741 were women (26.4%). Of total number of violent deaths, 1,463 were caused by accident, 949 were suicides and 98 were homicides.

Serbia is among world's ten countries with highest smoking rate, and it has the highest rate in Europe of female smokers (40%), and the fifth-highest rate of male smokers (44%). In 2015, it was estimated that 11.96% of the population had diabetes, costing about $666 per person per year.

== See also ==
- Healthcare in Serbia
- List of hospitals in Serbia
- COVID-19 pandemic in Serbia
