= Josif Holec =

Serbian military surgeon (1835–1898)

- Јосиф Холец
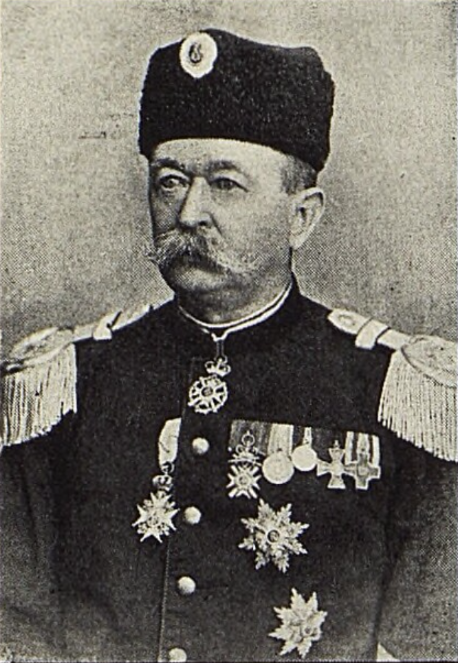
- Josif Holec c. 1890
- Born: 1835; Tuřice, Kingdom of Bohemia, Empire of Austria
- Died: 1898 (aged 62–63); Belgrade, Kingdom of Serbia

Јоsif Holec (Serbian Cyrillic: Јосиф Холец, 1835–1898) was a colonel and a physician in the Serbian Army, one of the founders of the Serbian Medical Society in 1873. He was the Chief of the Military Medical Academy of the Kingdom of Serbia from 1882 to 1884.

== Life and career ==
Born in 1835 in Tuřice in Bohemia, Josif Holec first studied medicine in Prague and then in Vienna. He graduated with a doctor of medicine degree. In 1861 he became a surgeon and an obstetrician. He moved to Serbia, where he was employed as a district physician in Paraćin, and sometime later in Kruševac.

From 1866, he practised as a physician in the Internal Department of the Belgrade Military Hospital, and in 1873, he was promoted to manager of the Central Military Hospital in Belgrade. Among his many duties were preparing laws and regulations for the military medical corps with his professional colleagues Lazar Dokić and Filip Tajšić in case of war. Later, he joined the medical team of Medical Corps Major Stefan Nedok, the first head of the Internal Department of the Belgrade Military Hospital and the chief of Medical Services of Division and Corps in the Serbian-Turkish wars.

Also, he took part in Serbian-Turkish Wars of 1876 to 1878 and in 1885 he was at the battlefront in the Serbian-Bulgarian War, performing important duties as head of the medical corps of the Drina Division under the command of General Milutin Jovanović.

He died in Belgrade in 1898 at the age of 62.

== Work ==
As a prominent medical officer, he was a permanent member of the First Military Medical Committee. He is one of the founders of the Serbian Medical Society.

== Acknowledgments ==
For his work, Josif Holec was awarded Order of the Cross of Takovo and numerous other decorations.
