= List of hospitals in Serbia =

This is a list of hospitals in Serbia.

== Organization ==
As of 2026, there were 306 public healthcare institutions in Serbia, operated by the Ministry of Health. The ministry classifies hospitals into five categories:

- Health center (Serbian: дом здравља) – 151 community health centers, providing primary healthcare to the municipalities and cities;
- General Hospital (Serbian: општа болница) or Regional Health Center (Serbian: здравствени центар) – 42 general hospitals, providing secondary healthcare to the districts; total of 15,917 beds available;
- Clinical Hospital Center (Serbian: клиничко-болнички центар) – 5 clinical hospital centers, providing secondary and tertiary healthcare, four in Belgrade and one in Kosovo; total of 5,357 beds available;
- University Clinical Center (Serbian: универзитетски клинички центар) – 4 major medical centers, located in the largest cities and affiliated with the public universities in those cities as teaching hospitals; total of 7,218 beds available;
- Specialized Institutions – 7 specialized clinics, 61 institutes (of which 23 specialized for public health), 33 specialized hospitals (rehabilitation hospitals, lung diseases, psychiatric diseases and other), as well as military medical center and 2 military hospitals (financed and controlled by the Ministry of Defence).

== Health centers (primary healthcare) ==
Name	Location	District	Web address
Health center "Dr Janoš Hadži"	Bačka Topola	North Bačka	dzbt.co.rs
Health center "Dr Marton Šandor"	Mali Iđoš	North Bačka	dzmi.rs
Health center Subotica	Subotica	North Bačka	domzdravlja.org.rs
Health center Žitište	Žitište	Central Banat	dzzitiste.rs
Health center Zrenjanin	Zrenjanin	Central Banat	dzzrenjanin.rs
Health center Nova Crnja	Nova Crnja	Central Banat	dzsrpskacrnja.rs
Health center Novi Bečej	Novi Bečej	Central Banat	
Health center Sečanj	Sečanj	Central Banat	domzdravljasecanj.rs
Health center Ada	Ada	North Banat	dzada.co.rs
Health center Kanjiža	Kanjiža	North Banat	dzkanjiza.org.rs
Health center Kikinda	Kikinda	North Banat	dzki.rs
Health center Novi Kneževac	Novi Kneževac	North Banat	dznk.org.rs
Health center Senta	Senta	North Banat	zdravstvosenta.rs
Health center Čoka	Čoka	North Banat	dzcoka.com
Health center Alibunar	Alibunar	South Banat	dzalibunar.rs
Health center Bela Crkva	Bela Crkva	South Banat	dzbc.rs
Health center Vršac	Vršac	South Banat	dzvrsac.co.rs
Health center Kovačica	Kovačica	South Banat	dzkovacica.freetzi.com
Health center Kovin	Kovin	South Banat	domzdravljakovin.org.rs
Health center Opovo	Opovo	South Banat	dzopovo.rs
Health center Pančevo	Pančevo	South Banat	dzpancevo.org
Health center Plandište	Plandište	South Banat	dzplandiste.rs
Health center Apatin	Apatin	West Bačka	
Health center Kula	Kula	West Bačka	dzkula.rs
Health center Odžaci	Odžaci	West Bačka	dzodzaci.rs
Health center "Dr Đorđe Lazić"	Sombor	West Bačka	dzsombor.rs
Health center Bač	Bač	South Bačka	dz.bac.rs
Health center "Dr Mladen Stojanović"	Bačka Palanka	South Bačka	dzbacpal.org.rs
Health center Bački Petrovac	Bački Petrovac	South Bačka	dzbackipetrovac.rs
Health center "Dr Dušan Savić Doda"	Beočin	South Bačka	dzbeocin.com
Health center Žabalj	Žabalj	South Bačka	dzzabalj.rs
Health center "Veljko Vlahović"	Vrbas	South Bačka	dzvrbas.co.rs
Health center Bečej	Bečej	South Bačka	dzbecej.rs
Health center Novi Sad	Novi Sad	South Bačka	dzns.rs
Health center "Dr Đorđe Bastić"	Srbobran	South Bačka	dzsrbobran.rs
Health center Temerin	Temerin	South Bačka	dztemerin.rs
Health center Titel	Titel	South Bačka	dztitel.rs
Health center "Dr Milorad - Mika Pavlović"	Inđija	Srem	dzindjija.rs
Health center Irig	Irig	Srem	dzirig.rs
Health center "Dr Dragan Funduk"	Pećinci	Srem	dzpecinci.rs
Health center Ruma	Ruma	Srem	dzruma.rs
Health center Sremska Mitrovica	Sremska Mitrovica	Srem	dzsm.rs
Health center "Dr Jovan Jovanović Zmaj"	Stara Pazova	Srem	dzspazova.rs
Health center Šid	Šid	Srem	domzdravljasid.org.rs
Health center Bogatić	Bogatić	Mačva	dzbogatic.org.rs
Health center Vladimirci	Vladimirci	Mačva	
Health center "Dr Darinka Lukić"	Koceljeva	Mačva	dzkoceljeva.com
Health center Ljubovija	Ljubovija	Mačva	dzljubovija.com
Health center "Dr Draga Ljočić"	Šabac	Mačva	dzsabac.org.rs
Health center "Dr Milenko Marin"	Loznica	Mačva	dzloznica.co.rs
Health center Krupanj	Krupanj	Mačva	dzkrupanj.rs
Health center Mali Zvornik	Mali Zvornik	Mačva	dzmalizvornik.org.rs
Health center Lajkovac	Lajkovac	Kolubara	dzlajkovac.rs
Health center Ub	Ub	Kolubara	dzub.rs
Health center Valjevo	Valjevo	Kolubara	dzvaljevo.rs
Health center Mionica	Mionica	Kolubara	dzmionica.rs
Health center Osečina	Osečina	Kolubara	dzosecina.rs
Health center Ljig	Ljig	Kolubara	domzdravljaljig.rs
Health center "Dr Milan - Bane Đorđević"	Velika Plana	Podunavlje	dzvelikaplana.rs
Health center Smederevska Palanka	Smederevska Palanka	Podunavlje	
Health center Smederevo	Smederevo	Podunavlje	domzdravljasd.rs
Health center Veliko Gradište	Veliko Gradište	Braničevo	dzvg.rs
Health center Žabari	Žabari	Braničevo	
Health center Žagubica	Žagubica	Braničevo	
Health center Petrovac	Petrovac	Braničevo	domzdravljapetrovac.rs
Health center Požarevac	Požarevac	Braničevo	dzpozarevac.rs
Health center Golubac	Golubac	Braničevo	domzdravljagolubac.rs
Health center Kučevo	Kučevo	Braničevo	
Health center Malo Crniće	Malo Crniće	Braničevo	dzmcrnice.rs
Health center Batočina	Batočina	Šumadija	dzbatocina.rs
Health center "Dr Danica i Kosta Šamanović"	Knić	Šumadija	www.dzknic.rs
Health center Kragujevac	Kragujevac	Šumadija	dzkg.rs
Health center Lapovo	Lapovo	Šumadija	dzlapovo.rs
Health center "Dr Miloje Hadžić - Šule"	Rača	Šumadija	dzraca.rs
Health center "Sveti Đorđe"	Topola	Šumadija	dztopola.rs
Health center Despotovac	Despotovac	Pomoravlje	dzdespotovac.rs
Health center Jagodina	Jagodina	Pomoravlje	domzdravljaja.rs
Health center Rekovac	Rekovac	Pomoravlje	
Health center Svilajnac	Svilajnac	Pomoravlje	dzsvilajnac.com
Health center Ćuprija	Ćuprija	Pomoravlje	
Health center Paraćin	Paraćin	Pomoravlje	
Health center Bor	Bor	Bor	domzdravljabor.org.rs
Health center "Dr Veroljub Cakić"	Majdanpek	Bor	dzmpek.org.rs
Health center Boljevac	Boljevac	Zaječar	dzboljevac.rs
Health center Sokobanja	Sokobanja	Zaječar	dzsokobanja.com
Health center Zaječar	Zaječar	Zaječar	domzdravlja.zczajecar.com
Health center Užice	Užice	Zlatibor	zcue.rs
Health center Priboj	Priboj	Zlatibor	zcue.rs
Health center Prijepolje	Prijepolje	Zlatibor	dz.prijepolje.rs
Health center Čajetina	Čajetina	Zlatibor	zcue.rs
Health center Arilje	Arilje	Zlatibor	zcue.rs
Health center "Evelina Haverfild"	Bajina Bašta	Zlatibor	zcue.rs
Health center Kosjerić	Kosjerić	Zlatibor	zcue.rs
Health center Požega	Požega	Zlatibor	zcue.rs
Health center Sjenica	Sjenica	Zlatibor	zcue.rs
Health center Nova Varoš	Nova Varoš	Zlatibor	zcue.rs
Health center Čačak	Čačak	Moravica	domzdravljacacak.rs
Health center Gornji Milanovac	Gornji Milanovac	Moravica	dzgm.rs
Health center Ivanjica	Ivanjica	Moravica	dzivanjica.rs
Health center Lučani	Lučani	Moravica	dzlucani.rs
Health center "Dr Nikola Džamić"	Vrnjačka Banja	Raška	dzvbanja.org.rs
Health center Tutin	Tutin	Raška	dztutin.rs
Health center Kraljevo	Kraljevo	Raška	dzkraljevo.co.rs
Health center Raška	Raška	Raška	dzraska.rs
Health center "Dr Dobrivoje Ger Popović"	Aleksandrovac	Rasina	dzaleksandrovac.org.rs
Health center Brus	Brus	Rasina	dzbrus.org.rs
Health center Varvarin	Varvarin	Rasina	dzvarvarin.com
Health center "Dr Sava Stanojević"	Trstenik	Rasina	dztrstenik.rs
Health center Ćićevac	Ćićevac	Rasina	
Health center Kruševac	Kruševac	Rasina	dzkrusevac.org.rs
Health center Niš	Niš	Nišava	domzdravljanis.co.rs
Health center Gadžin Han	Gadžin Han	Nišava	dz.gadzinhan.rs/l
Health center Doljevac	Doljevac	Nišava	
Health center Merošina	Merošina	Nišava	dzmerosina.info
Health center Ražanj	Ražanj	Nišava	dzrazanj.org.rs
Health center "Dr Ljubinko Đorđević"	Svrljig	Nišava	domzdravlja.svrljig.rs
Health center Aleksinac	Aleksinac	Nišava	dzaleksinac.co.rs
Health center Blace	Blace	Toplica	dzblace.org.rs
Health center Žitorađa	Žitorađa	Toplica	dzzitoradja.com
Health center Kuršumlija	Kuršumlija	Toplica	dzkursumlija.org.rs
Health center Prokuplje	Prokuplje	Toplica	domzdravljaprokuplje.rs
Health center "Dr Jovan Ristić"	Babušnica	Pirot	
Health center Bela Palanka	Bela Palanka	Pirot	
Health center Dimitrovgrad	Dimitrovgrad	Pirot	dzdmg.rs
Health center Pirot	Pirot	Pirot	dzpirot.rs
Health center Bojnik	Bojnik	Jablanica	dzbojnik.org
Health center Vlasotince	Vlasotince	Jablanica	dzvlasotince.rs
Health center Lebane	Lebane	Jablanica	dzlebane.co.rs
Health center Leskovac	Leskovac	Jablanica	dzleskovac.com
Health center Medveđa	Medveđa	Jablanica	dzmedvedja.com
Health center Bosilegrad	Bosilegrad	Pčinja	dzbosilegrad.org.rs
Health center Bujanovac	Bujanovac	Pčinja	dzbujanovac.org.rs
Health center Vladičin Han	Vladičin Han	Pčinja	
Health center Preševo	Preševo	Pčinja	dzpresevo.org
Health center Trgovište	Trgovište	Pčinja	
Health center "Dr Milorad Vlajković"	Barajevo	Belgrade	dzbarajevo.com
Health center Voždovac	Belgrade	Belgrade	dzvozdovac.rs
Health center Vračar	Belgrade	Belgrade	dzvracar.org.rs
Health center Grocka	Grocka	Belgrade	dzgrocka.rs
Health center Zvezdara	Belgrade	Belgrade	dzzvezdara.rs
Health center Zemun	Belgrade	Belgrade	dzzemun.org.rs
Health center "Dr Đorđe Kovačević"	Lazarevac	Belgrade	dz-lazarevac.com
Health center Mladenovac	Mladenovac	Belgrade	dzmladenovac.rs
Health center Obrenovac	Obrenovac	Belgrade	domzdravljaobrenovac.com
Health center New Belgrade	Belgrade	Belgrade	dznbgd.com
Health center "Dr Milutin Ivković"	Belgrade	Belgrade	
Health center Rakovica	Belgrade	Belgrade	dzrakovica.rs
Health center Savski Venac	Belgrade	Belgrade	dzsvenac.rs
Health center Sopot	Sopot	Belgrade	
Health center Stari Grad	Belgrade	Belgrade	dzstarigrad.org
Health center "Dr Simo Milosević"	Belgrade	Belgrade	dzcukarica.co.rs

== General hospitals and Regional health centers (secondary healthcare) ==
Name	Location	District	Beds	Web address
General Hospital Subotica	Subotica	North Bačka	670	bolnicasubotica.com
General Hospital "Đorđe Jovanović"	Zrenjanin	Central Banat	600	bolnica.org.rs
General Hospital Kikinda	Kikinda	North Banat	280	obki.rs
General Hospital Senta	Senta	North Banat	240	hospitalsenta.rs
General Hospital Vršac	Vršac	South Banat	290	obvrsac.com
General Hospital Pančevo	Pančevo	South Banat	660	bolnicapancevo.rs
General Hospital "Dr Radivoj Simonović"	Sombor	West Bačka	732	bolnicasombor.org.rs
General Hospital Vrbas	Vrbas	South Bačka	270	obvs.rs
General Hospital Sremska Mitrovica	Sremska Mitrovica	Srem	513	obsm.rs
General Hospital Šabac	Šabac	Mačva	575	bolnica015.org.rs
General Hospital Loznica	Loznica	Mačva	461	bolnicaloznica.rs
General Hospital Valjevo	Valjevo	Kolubara	657	obvaljevo.rs
General Hospital "Saint Luke"	Smederevo	Podunavlje	399	obsmederevo.rs
General Hospital "Stefan Visoki"	Smederevska Palanka	Podunavlje	300	
General Hospital Petrovac na Mlavi	Petrovac	Braničevo	138	opstabolnicapetrovac.rs
General Hospital Požarevac	Požarevac	Braničevo	530	bolnica.obp.rs
General Hospital Aranđelovac	Aranđelovac	Šumadija	142	zcarandjelovac.org.rs
General Hospital Jagodina	Jagodina	Pomoravlje	270	bolnicajagodina.rs
General Hospital Ćuprija	Ćuprija	Pomoravlje	469	bolnicacuprija.com
General Hospital Paraćin	Paraćin	Pomoravlje	171	obparacin.rs
General Hospital Bor	Bor	Bor	310	borbolnica.org.rs
Regional Health Center Kladovo	Kladovo	Bor	135	zckladovo.co.rs
General Hospital Majdanpek	Majdanpek	Bor	50	obm.org.rs
Regional Health Center Negotin	Negotin	Bor	190	
General Hospital Zaječar	Zaječar	Zaječar	430	zczajecar.com
Regional Health Center Knjaževac	Knjaževac	Zaječar	120	zcknjazevac.rs
Regional Health Center Užice	Užice	Zlatibor	870	zcue.rs
General Hospital Priboj	Priboj	Zlatibor	110	zcue.rs
General Hospital Prijepolje	Prijepolje	Zlatibor	170	zcue.rs
General Hospital Gornji Milanovac	Gornji Milanovac	Moravica	150	bolnica-gm.org
General Hospital Čačak	Čačak	Moravica	527	obcacak.co.rs
Regional Health Center "Studenica"	Kraljevo	Raška	580	bolnicastudenicakv.co.rs
General Hospital Novi Pazar	Novi Pazar	Raška	420	obnp.co.rs
General Hospital Tutin	Tutin	Raška	60	
General Hospital Kruševac	Kruševac	Rasina	595	bolnicakrusevac.org.rs
General Hospital Aleksinac	Aleksinac	Nišava	135	obaleksinac.rs
General Hospital "Dr Aleksa Savić"	Prokuplje	Toplica	353	bolnicaprokuplje.com
General Hospital Pirot	Pirot	Pirot	332	pibolnica.rs
General Hospital Leskovac	Leskovac	Jablanica	795	bolnicaleskovac.org
Regional Health Center Surdulica	Surdulica	Pčinja	145	
Regional Health Center Vranje	Vranje	Pčinja	543	zcvranje.com
Regional Health Center Gnjilane	Gnjilane	Kosovo	530	zcgnjilane.org

== University clinical centers and Clinical hospital centers (tertiary healthcare) ==
Name	Location	District	Beds	Web address
University Clinical Centre of Serbia	Belgrade	Belgrade	3,150	kcs.ac.rs
University Clinical Centre of Niš	Niš	Nišava	1,525	kcnis.rs
University Clinical Centre of Vojvodina	Novi Sad	South Bačka	1,425	kcv.rs
University Clinical Centre of Kragujevac	Kragujevac	Šumadija	1,118	ukck.rs
Clinical Hospital Center Kosovska Mitrovica	Kosovska Mitrovica	Kosovo	700	kbckm.rs
Clinical Hospital Center "Zvezdara"	Belgrade	Belgrade	786	kbczvezdara.rs
Clinical Hospital Center "Zemun"	Belgrade	Belgrade	640	kbczemun.bg.ac.rs
Clinical Hospital Center "Dr Dragiša Mišović"	Belgrade	Belgrade	546	dragisamisovic.bg.ac.rs
Clinical Hospital Center "Bežanijska Kosa"	Belgrade	Belgrade	360	bkosa.rs

== Specialized institutions ==
=== Clinics ===
Name	Location	District	Web address
Clinic for Dentistry of Vojvodina	Novi Sad	South Bačka	kzsv.rs
Clinic for Dentistry	Niš	Nišava	kzsnis.rs
Clinic for Psychiatric Diseases "Dr Laza Lazarević"	Belgrade	Belgrade	lazalazarevic.rs
Clinic for Neurology for Children and Youth	Belgrade	Belgrade	neurologija.bg.ac.rs
University Children Clinic "Tiršova"	Belgrade	Belgrade	tirsova.rs
Gynecology and Obstetric Clinic "Narodni front"	Belgrade	Belgrade	gakfront.org
Rehabilitation Clinic "Dr Miroslav Zotović"	Belgrade	Belgrade	rehabilitacija.rs

=== Institutes ===
Name	Location	District	Web address
Institute for Health Care of Students Novi Sad	Novi Sad	South Bačka	zzzzsns.co.rs
Institute for Health Care of Workers Novi Sad	Novi Sad	South Bačka	medicinarada.rs
Institute for Emergency Medical Aid Novi Sad	Novi Sad	South Bačka	hitnapomocns.org.rs
Institute for Health Protection of Children and Youth of Vojvodina	Novi Sad	South Bačka	izzzdiovns.rs
Institute of Oncology of Vojvodina	Novi Sad	South Bačka	onk.ns.ac.rs
Institute for Cardiovascular Diseases of Vojvodina	Novi Sad	South Bačka	ikvbv.ns.ac.rs
Institute of Lung Diseases of Vojvodina	Novi Sad	South Bačka	ipb-ild.edu.rs
Blood Transfusion Institute of Vojvodina	Novi Sad	South Bačka	nbti.org.rs
Institute for Antibiotic Protection - Pasteur Institute	Novi Sad	South Bačka	paster.org.rs
Institute for Dentistry Kragujevac	Kragujevac	Šumadija	zzstomkg.rs
Institute for Health Care of Workers Kragujevac	Kragujevac	Šumadija	zzzrkg.rs
Institute for Emergency Medical Aid Kragujevac	Kragujevac	Šumadija	hitnapomoc.org
Institute for Health Care of Students Niš	Niš	Nišava	
Institute for Health Care of Workers Niš	Niš	Nišava	medradanis.rs
Institute for Lung Diseases and Tuberculosis Niš	Niš	Nišava	zavodtb.org.rs
Institute for Curing and Rehabilitation "Niška Banja"	Niška Banja	Nišava	radonnb.co.rs
Blood Transfusion Institute Niš	Niš	Nišava	transfuzijanis.rs
Institute for Forensic Medicine Niš	Niš	Nišava	sudmednis.rs
Institute for Emergency Medical Aid Niš	Niš	Nišava	hitnanis.org
Institute for Health Care of Students Belgrade	Belgrade	Belgrade	zzzzsbg.rs
City Institute for Emergency Medical Assistance	Belgrade	Belgrade	beograd94.rs
City Institute for Gerontology and Palliative Care	Belgrade	Belgrade	gerontology.co.rs
City Institute for Pulmonary Diseases and Tuberculosis	Belgrade	Belgrade	bolestipluca.org.rs
City Institute for Skin and Venereal Diseases	Belgrade	Belgrade	kvb.org.rs
Institute of Oncology and Radiology of Serbia	Belgrade	Belgrade	ncrc.ac.rs
Institute for Health Protection of Mother and Child of Serbia "Dr Vukan Čupić"	Belgrade	Belgrade	imd.org.rs
Institute of Neonatology	Belgrade	Belgrade	neonatologija.rs
National Institute for Heart and Blood Vessels "Dedinje"	Belgrade	Belgrade	ikvbd.com
Institute of Orthopedic Surgery "Banjica"	Belgrade	Belgrade	iohbb.edu.rs
Institute for Rehabilitation	Belgrade	Belgrade	rehabilitacija.com
Institute of Mental Health	Belgrade	Belgrade	imh.org.rs
Institute of Rheumatology	Belgrade	Belgrade	reumatologija.org.rs
Institute for Psychophysiological Disorders and Speech Pathology	Belgrade	Belgrade	zgp.org.rs
Institute for Blood Transfusion of Serbia	Belgrade	Belgrade	nbti.org.rs
Institute of Health Care for Workers of the Ministry of Internal Affairs	Belgrade	Belgrade	zzzzmup.rs
Institute of Occupational Medicine "Dr Dragomir Karajović"	Belgrade	Belgrade	imrs.rs
Institute of Biocides and Medical Ecology	Belgrade	Belgrade	biocidi.org.rs
Institute of Virology, Vaccines and Serums "Torlak"	Belgrade	Belgrade	torlakinstitut.com

=== Institutes for Public Health ===
Name	Location	District	Web address
Institute for Public Health Subotica	Subotica	North Bačka	zjzs.org.rs
Institute for Public Health Zrenjanin	Zrenjanin	Central Banat	zastitazdravlja.rs
Institute for Public Health Kikinda	Kikinda	North Banat	zavodki.org.rs
Institute for Public Health Pančevo	Pančevo	South Banat	zjzpa.org.rs
Institute for Public Health Sombor	Sombor	West Bačka	zzjzsombor.org
Institute for Public Health of Vojvodina	Novi Sad	South Bačka	izjzv.org.rs
Institute for Public Health Sremska Mitrovica	Sremska Mitrovica	Srem	zdravlje-sm.org.rs
Institute for Public Health Šabac	Šabac	Mačva	zjz.org.rs
Institute for Public Health Valjevo	Valjevo	Kolubara	zzjzvaljevo.co.rs
Institute for Public Health Požarevac	Požarevac	Braničevo	zzjzpo.rs
Institute for Public Health Kragujevac	Kragujevac	Šumadija	izjzkg.rs
Institute for Public Health "Pomoravlje"	Ćuprija	Šumadija	zzjzcuprija.com
Institute for Public Health "Timok"	Zaječar	Zaječar	zavodzajecar.rs
Institute for Public Health Užice	Užice	Zlatibor	zavodue.org.rs
Institute for Public Health Čačak	Čačak	Moravica	zdravljecacak.org
Institute for Public Health Kraljevo	Kraljevo	Raška	zjzkv.org.rs
Institute for Public Health Kruševac	Kruševac	Rasina	zavodks.rs
Institute for Public Health Niš	Niš	Nišava	izjz-nis.org.rs
Institute for Public Health Pirot	Pirot	Pirot	zzjzpirot.org.rs
Institute for Public Health Leskovac	Leskovac	Jablanica	zzjzle.org.rs
Institute for Public Health Vranje	Vranje	Pčinja	zjzvranje.org.rs
Institute for Public Health of Serbia "Dr Milan Jovanović Batut"	Belgrade	Belgrade	batut.org.rs
City Institute for Public Health	Belgrade	Belgrade	zdravlje.org.rs

=== Specialized Hospitals ===
Name	Location	District	Web address
Specialized Hospital for Lung Diseases "Dr Vasa Savić"	Zrenjanin	Central Banat	plucna.co.rs
Specialized Hospital for Rehabilitation "Banja Rusanda"	Melenci	Central Banat	banjarusanda.rs
Specialized Hospital for Rehabilitation "Banja Kanjiža"	Kanjiža	North Banat	banja-kanjiza.com
Specialized Hospital for Psychiatric Diseases "Sveti Vračevi"	Novi Kneževac	North Banat	
Specialized Hospital for Lung Diseases "Dr Budislav Babić"	Bela Crkva	South Banat	spbbelacrkva.org
Specialized Hospital for Psychiatric Diseases "Dr Slavoljub Bakalović"	Vršac	South Banat	pbvrsac.org.rs
Specialized Hospital for Psychiatric Diseases	Kovin	South Banat	sbpb.kovin.info
Specialized Hospital for Rehabilitation "Banja Junaković"	Apatin	West Bačka	banja-junakovic.rs
Specialized Hospital for Rheumatic Diseases	Novi Sad	South Bačka	sbnovisad.co.rs
Specialized Hospital "Dr Borivoje Gnjatić"	Slankamen	South Bačka	bolnicaslankamen.co.rs
Specialized Hospital for Rehabilitation "Termal"	Vrdnik	South Bačka	termal-vrdnik.com
Specialized Hospital for Rehabilitation "Banja Koviljača"	Banja Koviljača	Mačva	banjakoviljaca.rs
Specialized Hospital for Non-specific Lung Diseases "Sokobanja"	Sokobanja	Zaječar	soko-banja.rs
Specialized Hospital for Lung Diseases "Ozren"	Sokobanja	Zaječar	
Specialized Hospital for Rehabilitation "Gamzigrad"	Zaječar	Zaječar	gamzigradskabanja.org.rs
Specialized Hospital for Diseases of Thyroid Gland and Metabolic Diseases "Zlatibor"	Zlatibor	Zlatibor	cigota.rs
Specialized Hospital for Rehabilitation	Ivanjica	Moravica	sbivanjica.rs
Specialized Hospital for Internal Diseases "Vrnjačka Banja"	Vrnjačka Banja	Raška	bolnicavb.org.rs
Specialized Hospital for Treatment and Rehabilitation "Merkur"	Vrnjačka Banja	Raška	vrnjcispa.rs
Specialized Hospital for Rehabilitation "Agens"	Mataruška Banja	Raška	agensmb.rs
Specialized Hospital for Progressive Muscular and Neuromuscular diseases	Novi Pazar	Raška	
Specialized Hospital for Rehabilitation "Ribarska Banja"	Ribarska Banja	Rasina	ribarskabanja.rs
Specialized Hospital for Psychiatric Diseases "Gornja Toponica"	Gornja Toponica	Nišava	spbtoponica.rs
Specialized Hospital for Rehabilitation "Gejzer"	Sijarinska Banja	Jablanica	gejzer.rs
Specialized Hospital for Lung Diseases	Surdulica	Pčinja	
Specialized Hospital for Rehabilitation "Vranjska Banja"	Vranjska Banja	Pčinja	vranjskabanja.co.rs
Specialized Hospital for Rehabilitation "Bujanovačka Banja"	Bujanovac	Pčinja	bujanovackabanja.rs
Specialized Hospital for Endemic Nephropathy	Lazarevac	Belgrade	nefropatijalaz.org.rs
Specialized Hospital for Internal Diseases	Mladenovac	Belgrade	sbib.rs
Specialized Hospital for Prevention and Treatment CVB "Saint Sava"	Belgrade	Belgrade	svetisava.rs
Specialized Hospital for Addiction Disseases	Belgrade	Belgrade	drajzerova.org.rs
Specialized Hospital for Cerebral Palsy and Developmental Neurology	Belgrade	Belgrade	sbcprn.com
Specialized Hospital for Rehabilitation and Orthopedic Prosthetics	Belgrade	Belgrade	zop.rs

=== Military Hospitals ===
Name	Location	District	Web address
Military Medical Academy	Belgrade	Belgrade	vma.mod.gov.rs
Military Hospital Niš	Niš	Nišava	vbnis.mod.gov.rs
Military Hospital Novi Sad	Novi Sad	South Bačka	

== See also ==
- Health in Serbia
- Healthcare in Serbia
