= University Clinical Centre of Vojvodina =

Hospital in Novi Sad, Serbia

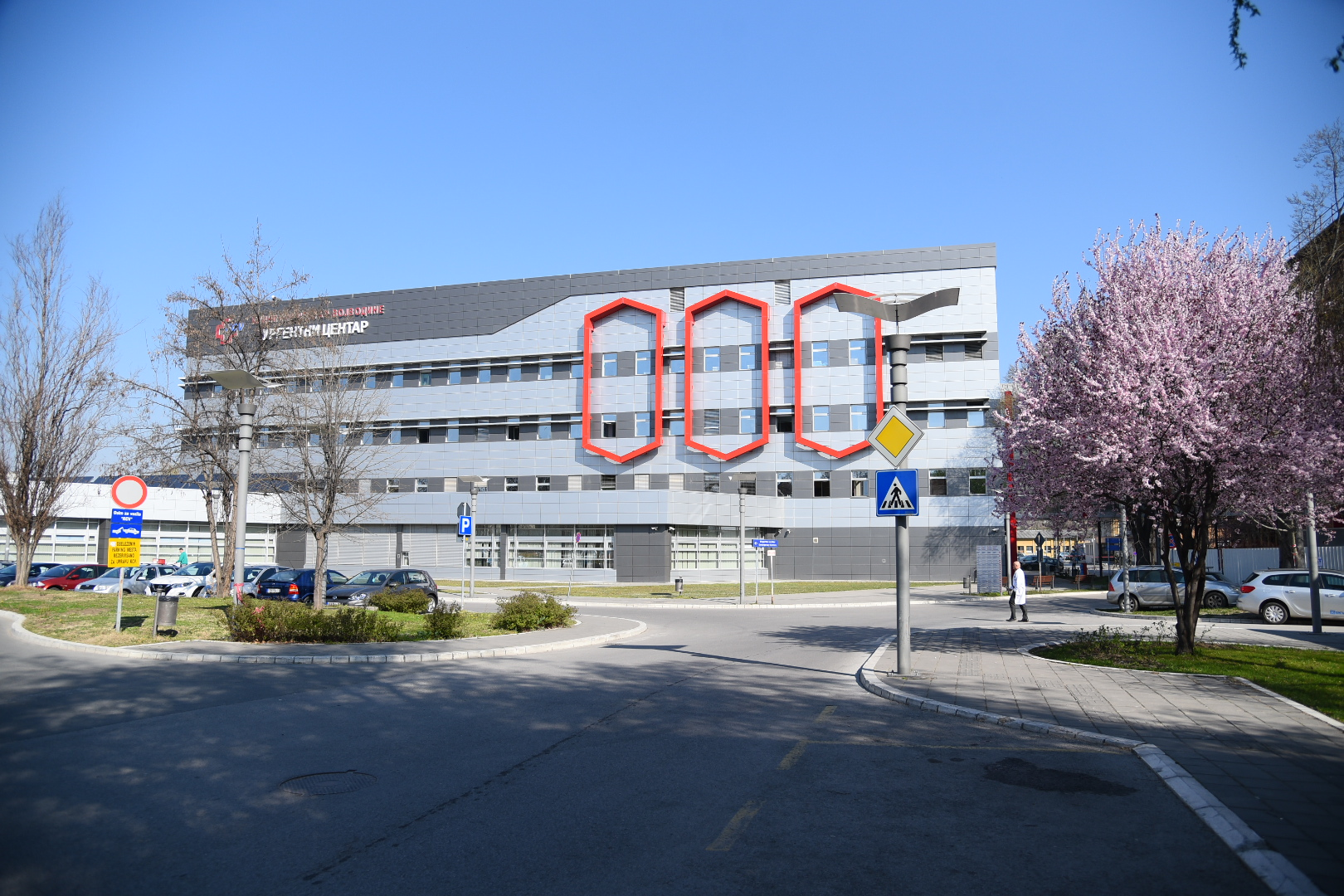
- Emergency center of the University Clinical Centre of Vojvodina

Geography
- Location: Hajduk Veljka 1, 21137 Novi Sad, Vojvodina, Serbia
- Coordinates: 45.251°N 19.822°E

Organisation
- Type: Public; Academic Medical Center
- Affiliated university: University of Novi Sad

Services
- Emergency department: Yes
- Beds: 1,425 (2017)

Helipads
- Helipad: No

History
- Founded: 1909; 117 years ago

Links
- Website: www.kcv.rs

The University Clinical Centre of Vojvodina (Serbian: Универзитетски Клинички центар Војводине / Univerzitetski Klinički centar Vojvodine; abbr. УКЦВ / UKCV), commonly known as Provincial Hospital (Serbian: Покрајинска болница / Pokrajinska bolnica) is a medical centre providing tertiary level health care services for the population of Vojvodina, the northern province of Serbia. It is located in Novi Sad, Vojvodina, Serbia. The University Clinical Centre is also the single emergency centre and inpatient hospital for the population of the city of Novi Sad and the region of South Bačka.

The clinics and diagnostic centers within the University Clinical Center also represent the main research and education facilities of the University of Novi Sad, Faculty of Medicine and provide specialist trainings for medical graduates.

== History ==
The Great City Hospital was founded in 1909, and it was comprised departments of surgery, gynecology and obstetrics, dermatology and venereal, and internal and infectious diseases. Later, name of the hospital was changed into the Main Provincial Hospital (Glavna Pokrajinska bolnica), with around 400 beds. In 1977, the hospital became a teaching hospital, following the establishment of the Faculty of Medicine within the University of Novi Sad.

Parts of the original pavilion complex survive within the present hospital campus, including the Clinic for abdominal and endocrine surgery, which served as the administrative center of the hospital when it opened in 1909.

The present University Clinical Centre of Vojvodina was founded by the decision of the Government of Serbia in 1997.

As of 2017, the University Clinical Centre holds 1,425 hospital beds, and its staff of 2,738 includes 502 medical doctors, 5 pharmacists, 1,350 nurses and technicians, 34 allied health professionals, 182 administrative and 665 ancillary and maintenance workers.

== See also ==
- Clinic for abdominal and endocrine surgery, Novi Sad
- Sremska Kamenica Institute
- Healthcare in Serbia
- List of hospitals in Serbia
