= Sremska Kamenica Institute =

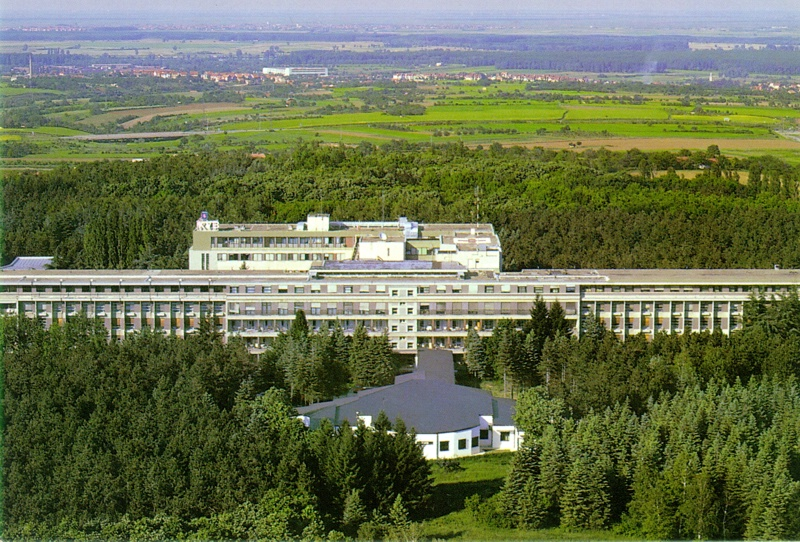

Geography
- Location: Sremska Kamenica, Novi Sad, Serbia
- Coordinates: 45.21720°N 19.85618°E

Organisation
- Type: Public

Services
- Beds: 848 (2017)

History
- Founded: 1957; 69 years ago

Links
- Lists: Hospitals in Serbia

Sremska Kamenica Institute is a Serbian university and hospital in Sremska Kamenica, one of the neighborhoods of Novi Sad - the capital of the Serbian province of Vojvodina.

== Institute complex ==
The whole complex is divided into a couple of buildings and different institutes. It consist of three institutes:

- The Institute of Cardiovascular diseases
  - Clinic of Cardiology
  - Clinic of Cardiovascular Surgery
- The Institute of Oncology
- The Institute for Lung diseases

The largest building is for The Institute of Cardiovascular Diseases, located in the building built in 1960 (almost fully renovated in 1984). The whole complex is surrounded by the park and validity under the state's protection. The Institute is a constituent part of the Faculty of Medicine in Novi Sad as a separate health and organization unit.

== History ==
The first hospital was built for the Institute for Tuberculosis (today's Institute for Lung diseases) in 1957. The first patient was admitted to the new hospital on 6 June 1960. The diagnostic department for non-tuberculous patients was opened the following year and the surgery unit shortly afterwards, where resection surgeries of the lungs were performed.

The Institute of Oncology is founded later on the same location in 1965. In 1977, The Institute of Cardiovascular Diseases was founded. As of 2017, the Institute has 848 beds.

== See also ==
- Healthcare in Serbia
- List of hospitals in Serbia
