= University Clinical Centre of Serbia =

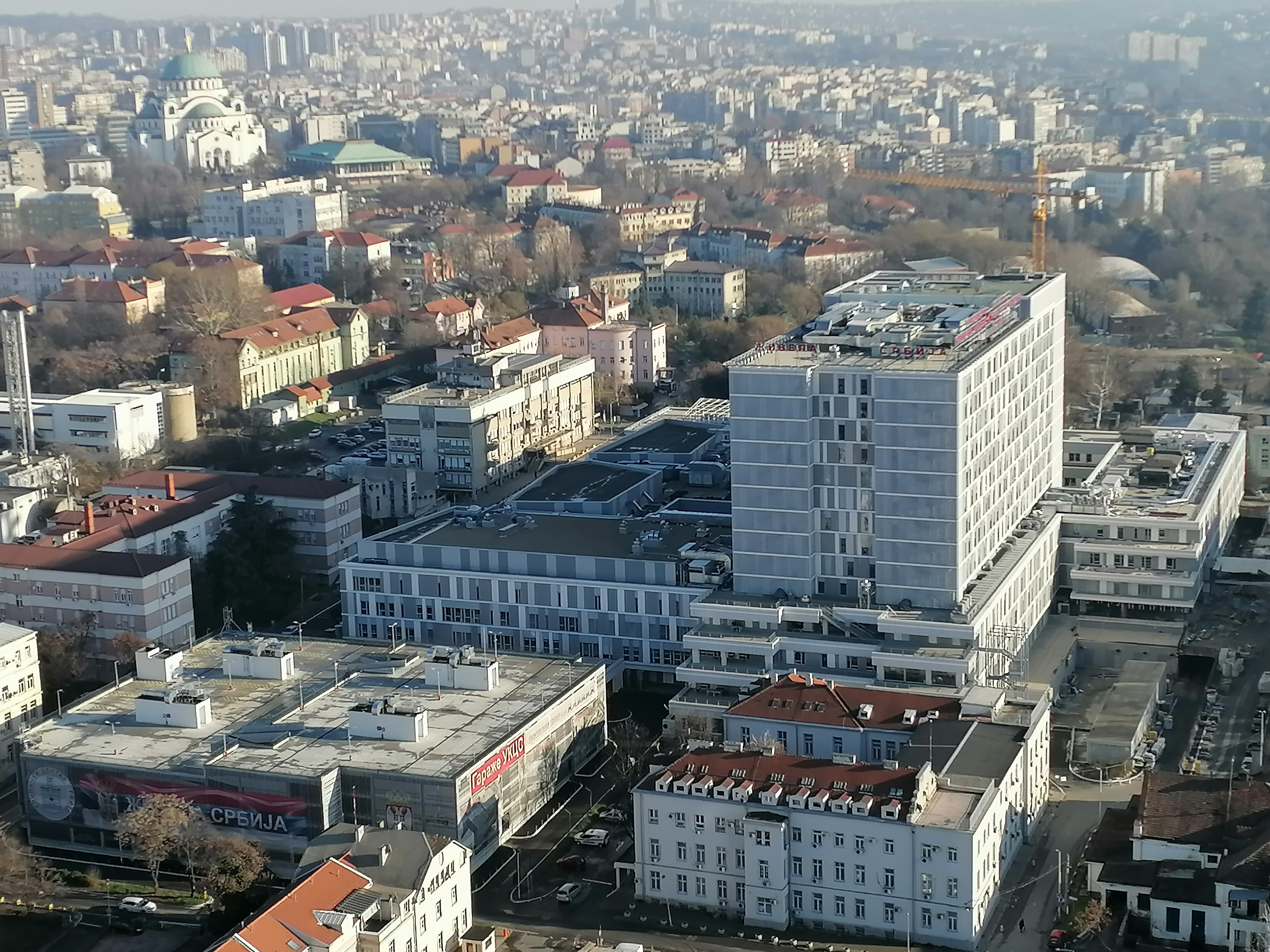
- Polyclinic of the University Clinical Centre of Serbia

Geography
- Location: Pasterova 2, 11000 Belgrade, Serbia
- Coordinates: 44.798176°N 20.456760°E

Organisation
- Type: Public; Academic medical centre
- Affiliated university: University of Belgrade

Services
- Emergency department: Yes
- Beds: 3,205 (2026)

Helipads
- Helipad: Yes

History
- Founded: 1 January 1983; 43 years ago

Links
- Website: www.kcs.ac.rs
- Lists: Hospitals in Serbia

The University Clinical Centre of Serbia (Serbian: Универзитетски клинички центар Србије, romanized: Univerzitetski klinički centar Srbije; abbr. УKЦС / UKCS) is an academic medical centre located in Belgrade, Serbia. It serves as the main medical centre for both Belgrade and the rest of Serbia.

== Organization ==
It contains 41 organisational units, of which 23 are clinics, 9 centers, polyclinic and other service units. The complex also houses the Belgrade School of Medicine and the Medical High School. Clinical Centre spreads over 34 hectares on the territory of Savski Venac, and it consists of about 50 buildings, with a total floor space of 280,000 square meters (3,113,000 square ft).

The University Clinical Centre of Serbia has 3,205 beds, considered to be the highest number in Europe, and among highest in the world. Annually, around one million patients are treated, 90,000 hospitalized, over 50,000 surgeries performed, and more than 7,000 childbirths performed. As of June 2019, the health centre has 7,386 employees.

In August 2018, the President of Serbia announced that the Government of Serbia is investing 110 million euros in complex' facilities reconstruction from 2018 to 2022. On 27 February 2022, the renovated Clinical Centre was opened; total cost amounted 260 million euros.

== See also ==
- Healthcare in Serbia
- List of hospitals in Serbia
