= Iodine Spa, Novi Sad =

Coordinates: 45°14′59″N 19°49′44″E

Iodine Spa in Novi Sad
- Јодна бања (Serbian)
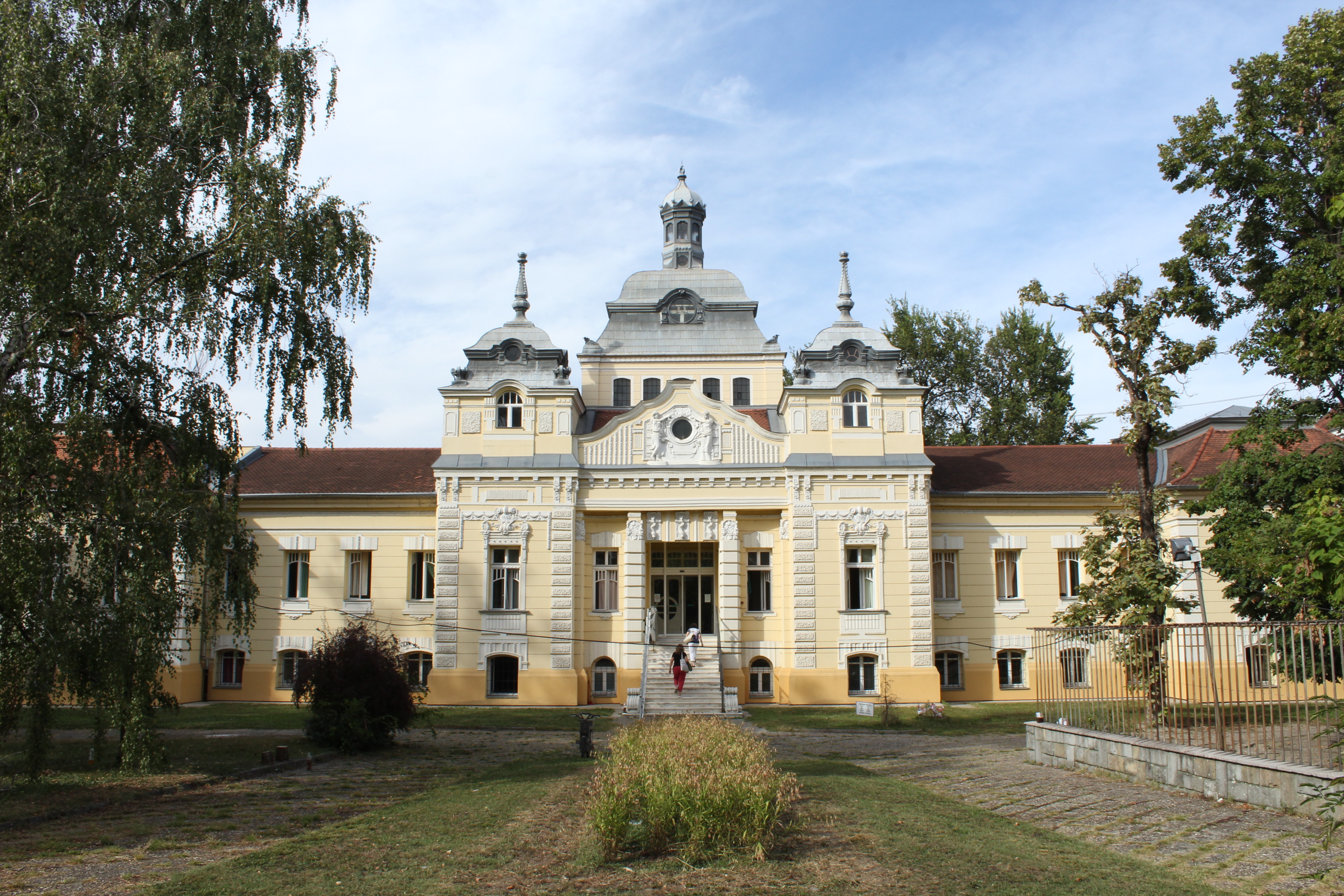
- Iodine Spa in 2023
- Interactive map of the Iodine Spa in Novi Sad area

General information
- Architectural style: Secession (Art Nouveau)
- Location: Futoška 68, Novi Sad, Serbia
- Current tenants: Special Hospital for Rheumatic Diseases Novi Sad
- Completed: 1910

Design and construction
- Architect: Imre Franček

Iodine Spa (Serbian Cyrillic: Јодна бања), historically known as the Artesian Iodine Baths, is a historic spa and medical complex located in Novi Sad, Vojvodina, Serbia. Built in the early 20th century around a mineral-rich artesian well, it is recognized as a significant example of spa culture and early modern architecture in the region.

== History ==
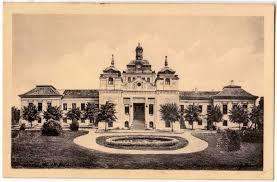
Iodine Spa in 1925

The origins of the Iodine Spa date to 1897–1898, when an artesian well was drilled near present-day Futoški Park to improve the water supply for the growing city. The drilling unexpectedly brought up warm, mineral-rich water containing significant concentrations of iodine, whose therapeutic properties were later confirmed by chemical analysis.

Initially, a simple public bath was established at the site, but this structure burned down in 1900. The city later granted concessions for private bathing facilities, yet demand continued to exceed capacity. In 1905, the municipal government took over the spa, ordered detailed analysis of the water, and acted on the unusually high iodine content compared to other regional artesian sources.

Construction of a permanent spa building began in 1908, designed by architect Imre Franček, and was completed around 1910 in the Secession (Art Nouveau) style. At the time, the facility included 40 bathing tubs, a steam bath with 50 cabins, and a large restaurant, surrounded by an English-style park covering roughly 20 hectares. A pool building and outdoor recreational areas, including tennis courts, were also part of the complex.

Between the two World Wars, Iodine Spa became a prestigious health resort and social center in Novi Sad, attracting residents from across the region for therapeutic treatments for rheumatic conditions, neuralgia, sciatica, obesity, and chronic digestive disorders.

In 1929, the Hotel Park was built adjacent to the main facility, designed by architect Đorđe Tabaković, to accommodate visitors.

By 1977, the original large bathing pool was closed due to deterioration, and the hydrotherapy functions gradually declined in the late 20th century.

== Architecture ==
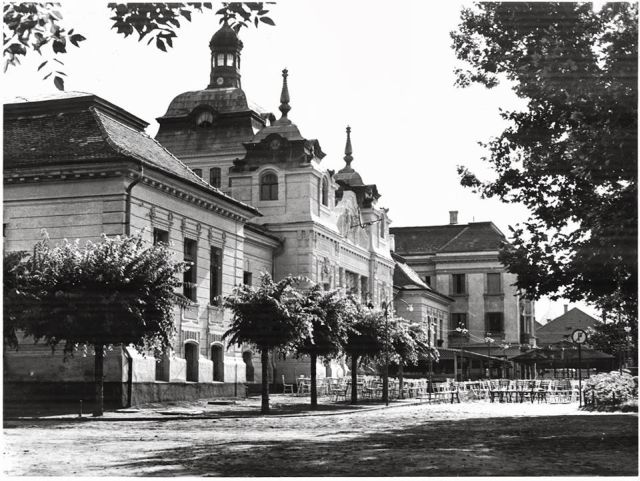
Exterior view of the Iodine Spa in 1910

The main building of the Iodine Spa is an outstanding example of early 20th-century Secession architecture. The richly decorated principal façade features sculptural ornamentation, including stylized nymphs, fish, and other water-related motifs. The central portal is crowned with a flattened dome and lantern, while interior spaces, including a vaulted hall with multiple stained-glass windows,exemplify intricate stucco work from the period.

The surrounding landscaped park was designed in the English style to complement the therapeutic atmosphere of the spa complex.

== Medical Use ==
Originally functioning as a public therapeutic spa, Iodine Spa offered iodine-rich mineral baths believed to alleviate various medical conditions. Its waters were reputed for treatment of rheumatic ailments and other chronic illnesses.

Today, the historic complex houses the Special Hospital for Rheumatic Diseases Novi Sad, the only institution of its type in the Vojvodina region, offering modern diagnostic and rehabilitation services.

== Cultural Significance ==
Jodna Banja holds cultural and historical importance as a reflection of early modern spa culture, balneological science, and civic development in Novi Sad at the turn of the 20th century. It remains an architectural landmark in the city and a link to its past as a recognized health destination.

== See also ==
- Novi Sad
- Vojvodina
- Art Nouveau
