= Healthcare in Serbia =

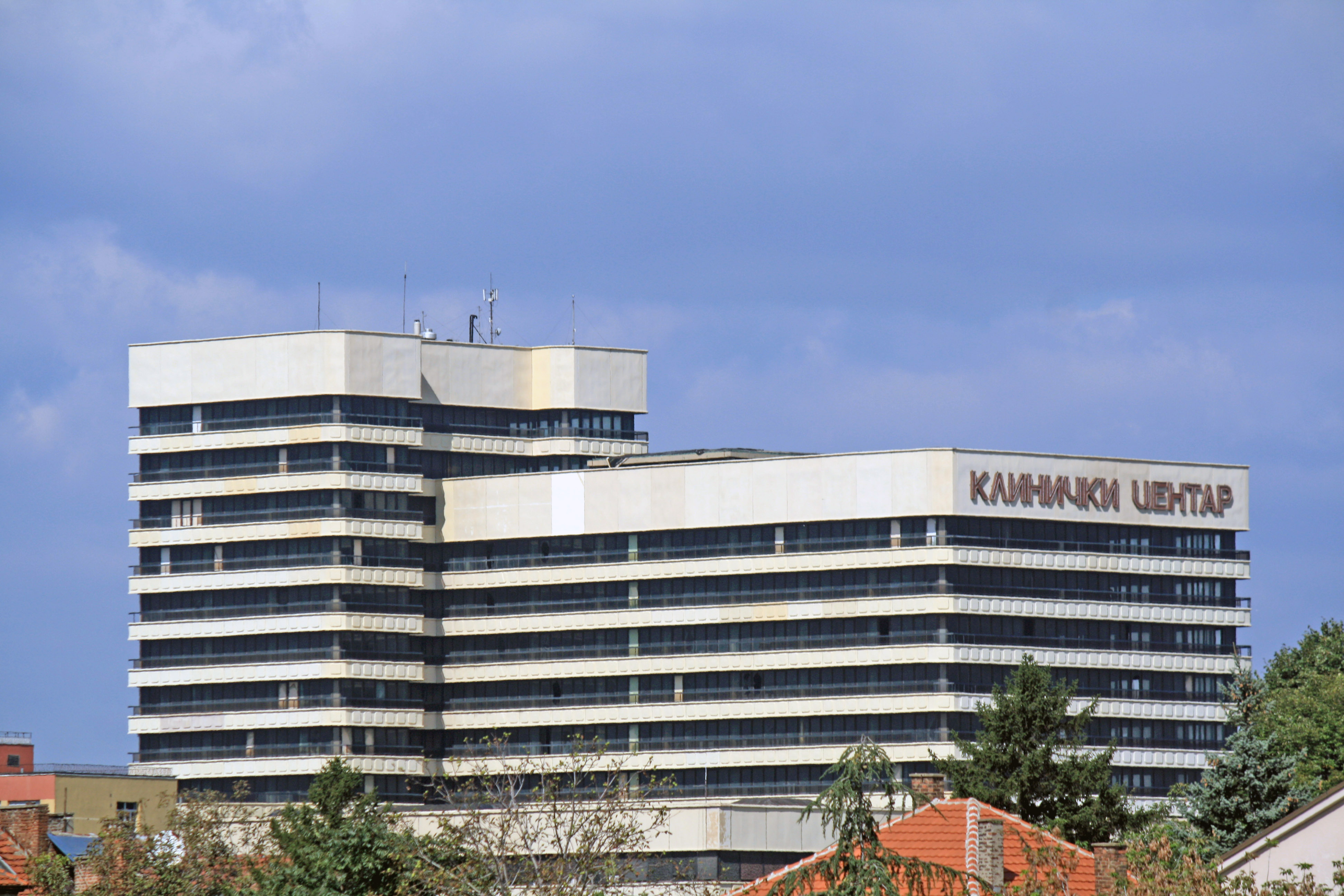
Old Clinical Center of Serbia, Belgrade

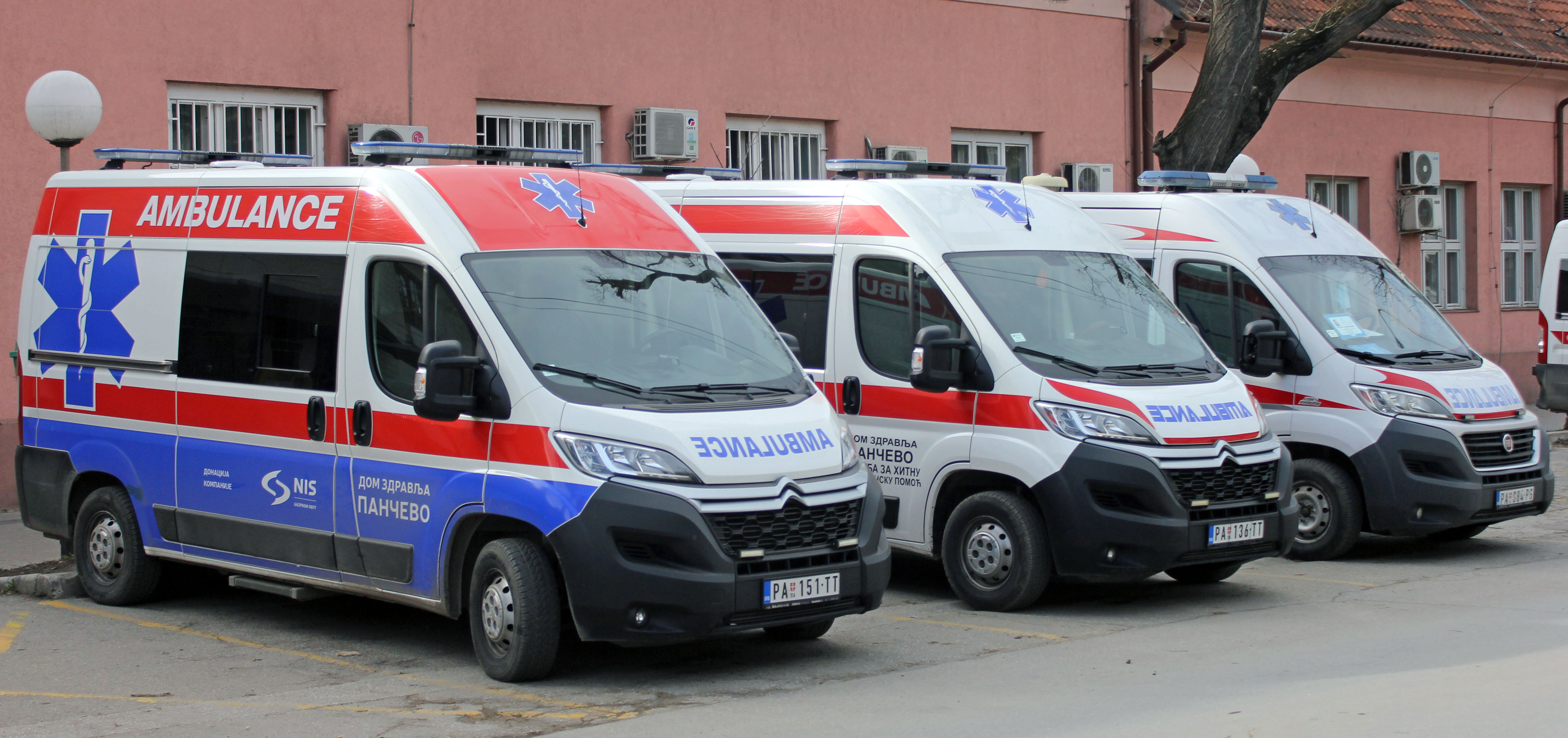
Ambulances in Serbia

Healthcare in Serbia is delivered by means of a universal health care system.

== History ==
=== 1930–1991 ===
The general reorientation of health services towards social and preventive medicine and primary health care was officially accepted in the Federal Republic of Yugoslavia after the Second World War. It built on some fundamental principles introduced in the 1930s by Dr Andrija Štampar. Primary health care (at that time called basic care) in the Yugoslav health system held a priority position for more than 40 years. However, from the beginning of the 1960s, preserving primary health care as the "center of the system" faced serious challenges, including a centralized and vertically programmed approach to preventive medicine, inadequate skills and competencies of health professionals in health promotion, and a relatively low economic and social status of health professionals in primary health care.

Between the 1960s and 1980s, little effort was made to improve the status and performance of primary health care. Meanwhile, an experiment with self-governing communities of interest in the health sector further decreased the efficiency and quality of services.

=== 1991–2000 ===
With the violent disintegration of the former Yugoslavia in 1991, the already weakened and structurally distorted economy of the Republic of Serbia entered an acute phase of the crisis, with drastic consequences to the health care system and to other social sectors. Due to dwindling real resources, as well as to an inefficient, over-extended and poorly managed public health sector, health care has been facing huge problems: frequent shortage of basic drugs and medical supplies, inadequate nutrition of patients, obsolete and broken medical equipment, and lack of basic materials, a deteriorating infrastructure and demoralized staff. Consequently, the quality and quantity of health services sharply deteriorated.

=== 2000–present ===
Development of life expectancy at birth in Serbia

The first strategic paper was enacted two years after the political changes of 5 October 2000 and later in comparison with reforms in other welfare programs. Only in 2005 were the new Laws regulating health care and health insurance adopted. The dominant provider of health care services is still the state, and the organization of public health care facilities has been characterized by an insufficiently clear division of levels of care. Compared to the period of socialism, the most striking changes were made with the introduction of mandatory health insurance and the widening of the scope of work and types of private health care services.

Along with the dominance of the public sector, the activities of the private health care sector have been steadily increasing. They are mainly offered at the level of primary health care, but also at the level of highly profitable specialized health care services. However, any of the so far implemented reforms did not prevent the parallel existence of the two sectors. The functioning of the private sector is still lacking completely clear regulations.

Private health insurance has a short history; it is regulated by the Regulation on Voluntary Health Insurance in Serbia of 2008. Private health insurance is designed as a form of substitution for those without a public insurance and for those opting for higher standards.

In 2014, the Chairperson of "Doctors Against Corruption" was appointed a Special Adviser to the Ministry of Health.

In October 2015, the List of Licensed Medical Practitioners appeared on the Serbian Medical Chamber's website, which wasn't previously accessible to the citizens.

The Health Protection Act and the Health Insurance Act came into force on 11 April 2019. There is a list of health institutions that cannot be privately owned:

- emergency medical assistance,
- provision of blood and blood products,
- harvesting, preservation and transplantation of human organs and parts of human bodies,
- production of serums and vaccines,
- pathoanatomy and autopsy
- forensic medicine service

A Register of Health Institutions is to be established by the Agency for Business Registers of Serbia by 11 October 2020. A common waiting list system is to be established.

Patients are obliged to submit to targeted preventive examinations. If they fail to undergo a mandatory screening without justification, they have to contribute a maximum of 35% of the total cost of health services if they are diagnosed before the next screening cycle begins.

Gifts worth more than 5% of the average monthly net salary in Serbia to health professionals are outlawed.

== Current system ==
The healthcare system is managed by the National Health Insurance Fund (NHIF), which covers all citizens and permanent residents. All employees, self-employed persons, and pensioners must pay contributions to it. Contributions are based on a sliding scale, with wealthier members of society paying higher percentages of their income. Despite this, corruption still remains a serious problem due to low salaries, with many doctors demanding bribes in exchange for better treatment, although there is a major campaign against corruption from the government and NGOs.

As of 2014, the expenditure on health care in Serbia was 10.37% of GDP in 2014, US$1,312 per capita. Also, as of 2014, Serbia had 308 doctors per 100,000 people (360 per 100,000 people was the European Union (EU) average) and 628 non-doctoral medical staff per 100,000 people (1,199 per 100,000 people was the EU average). Although there is a trend toward a decreasing number of hospital beds per 100,000 people in Europe due to better efficiency and diagnostics, Serbia is among the countries in Europe with 552 hospital beds per 100,000 people. In terms of the availability of medical equipment, Serbia is slightly trailing behind the average of EU countries.

The Government of Serbia is working with the World Bank to improve the quality and efficiency of Serbia's healthcare system.

== Culture ==
Self care is mainly practiced when a patient is already ill versus as a preventive measure. Care is usually sought from healthcare professionals such as doctors or nurses where bribes are commonly expected, but some folk medications are used such as teas, vinegar, herbs, and vitamins. Changes in activity levels such as more rest or increased exercise are sometimes used as curative measures for illness, and perceived causes of illness may be improper diet or fate. Most former Yugoslavians feel health is not the absence of disease, but rather it is "wealth and the most important thing in life" and "to have enough strength".

== See also ==
- Health in Serbia
- List of hospitals in Serbia
