= Poland–Serbia relations =

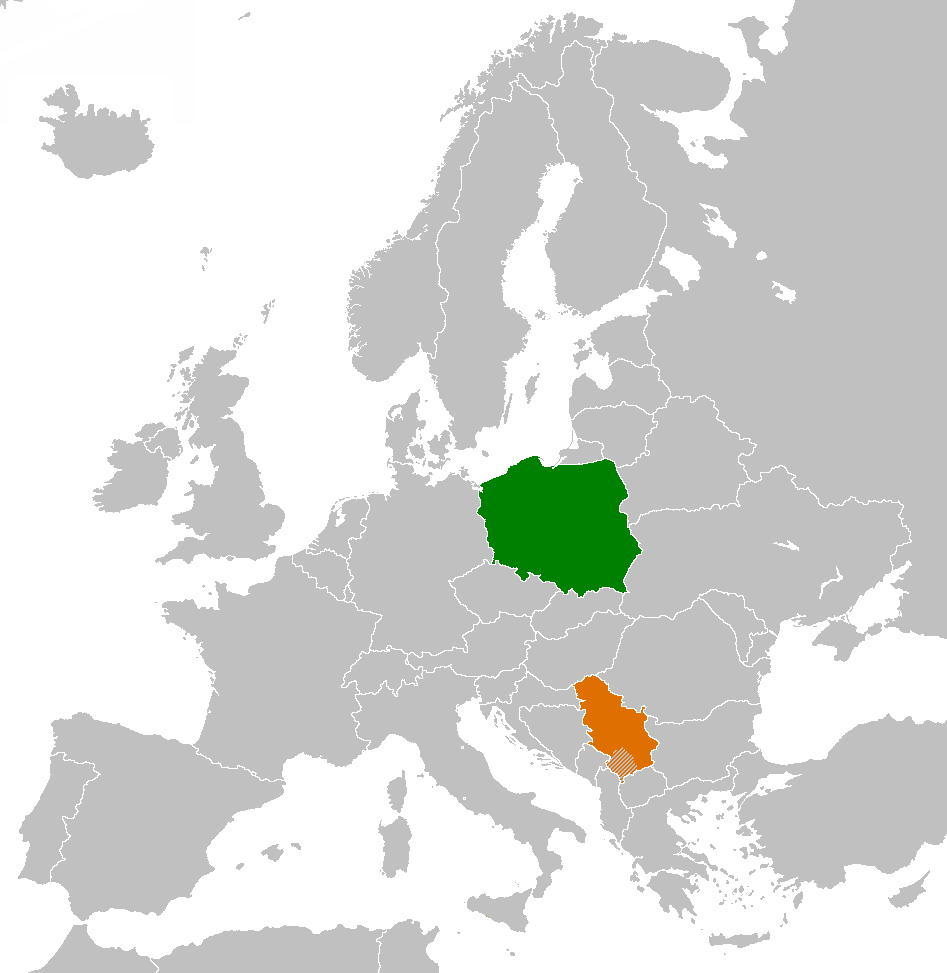
- Poland: Serbia

Poland and Serbia maintain diplomatic relations established between Poland and the Kingdom of Yugoslavia in 1919. From 1919 to 2006, Poland maintained relations with the Kingdom of Yugoslavia, the Socialist Federal Republic of Yugoslavia (SFRY), and the Federal Republic of Yugoslavia (FRY) (later Serbia and Montenegro), of which Serbia is considered shared (SFRY) or sole (FRY) legal successor.

== History ==
=== Middle Ages ===
Queen Jadwiga of Poland (r. 1384–99) had partial Serbian ancestry, through King Stefan Dragutin (r. 1276–82) of the Nemanjić dynasty. Serbian fiddlers (guslars) were mentioned at the court of Polish king Władysław II Jagiełło (r. 1386–1434) in 1415.

Polish knight Zawisza Czarny, who joined Hungarian–Bohemian King Sigismund's war against the Ottomans, fell at the Golubac fortress in eastern Serbia in 1428; there is a commemorative plaque on the fortress in his honour (Česma Zaviše Crnog). Hungarian commander John Hunyadi led a long campaign against the Ottomans in 1443–44, accompanied by Polish king Władysław III, Serbian despot Đurađ Branković, Wallachian voivode Vlad II Dracul, and a Polish contingent. They marched throughout Serbia and defeated the Ottomans at Niš.

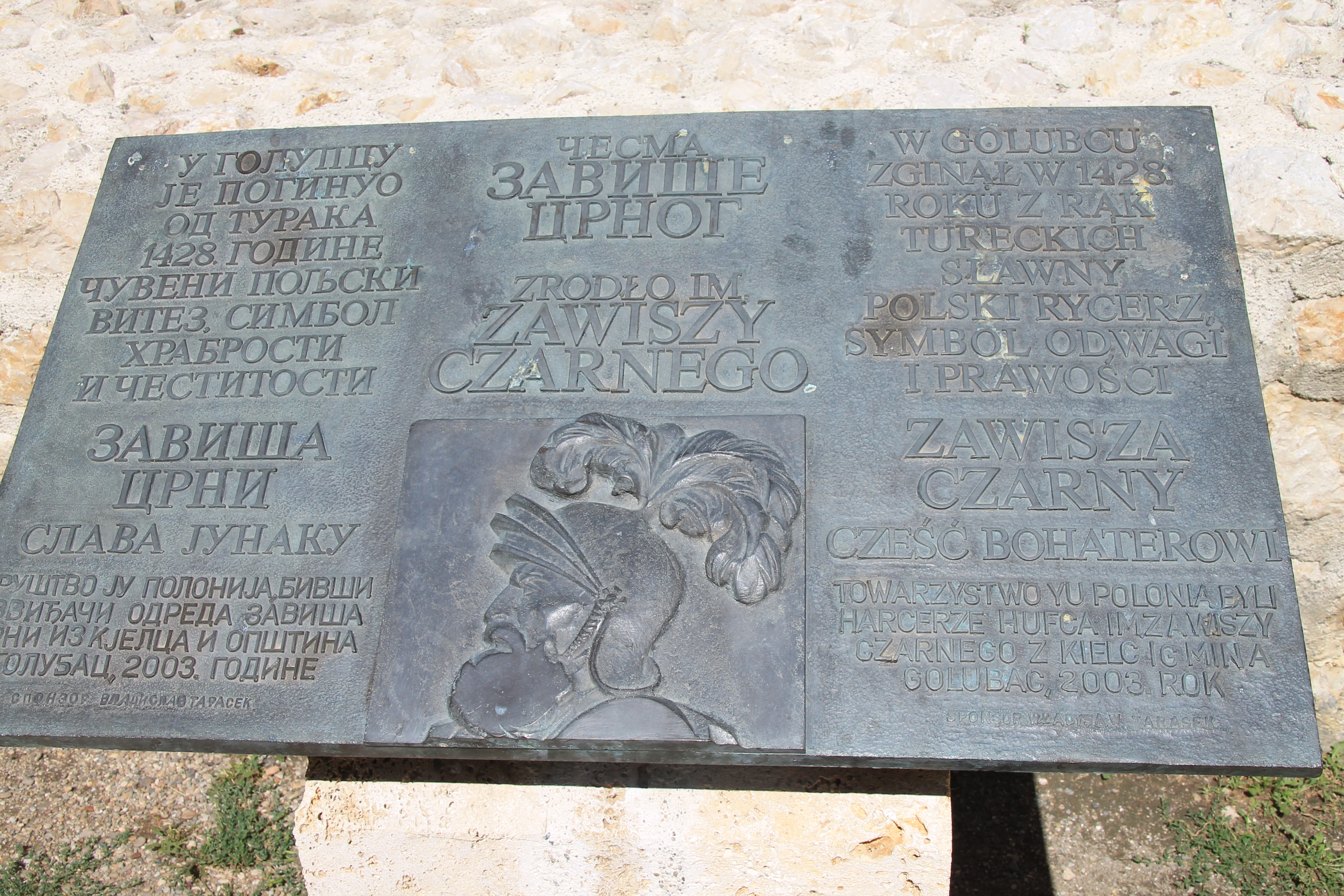
Memorial plaque to Zawisza Czarny at the Golubac Fortress in Serbia

The Polish hussars (cavalry) originated in mercenary units of exiled Serbian warriors, the concept having originated in Serbia in the late 14th century. The oldest mention of hussars in Polish documents date to 1500, although they were probably in service earlier.

After the Ottoman conquest of Serbia, Serbian guslars (fiddlers) found refuge throughout Europe, as mentioned in sources. Polish poets of the 17th century mentioned Serbian epic poetry and the gusle in their works. In a poem published in 1612, Kasper Miaskowski wrote that "the Serbian gusle and gaidas will overwhelm Shrove Tuesday" (Serbskie skrzypki i dudy ostatek zagluszą). In the idyll named Śpiewacy, published in 1663, Józef Bartłomiej Zimorowic used the phrase "to sing to the Serbian gusle" (przy Serbskich gęślach śpiewać).

=== Modern Age ===
There are documents on Polish officers participating in the First Serbian Uprising (1804-1813). In the second half of the 19th century, especially after the suppression of the January Uprising in Poland (1864), some 20 Polish doctors arrived in Serbia, most of which settled down and gave a great contribution to the development of medical culture in the renewed Serbian state.

After the November Uprising (1830–31), Polish revolutionaries fled to the Principality of Serbia. Serbian commander, and later politician, Ilija Garašanin (1812–1874) contacted these Polish emigrees. It was a Pole, Adam Czartoryski, who initiated the Načertanije project (the precursor to Greater Serbia). While in 1804, during his mandate as a Russian foreign minister, Czartoryski tended to dismiss what he perceived as Serb ambitious requests, he later substantially changed his view when as one of the exiled Polish leaders he perceived the Principality of Serbia as the key member of the future anti-imperialist (Austrian and Russian) aliance of small European states.

The great Polish poet Adam Mickiewicz (1798–1855) thought highly of Serb epic poetry, and chose it as a theme of lectures at Collège de France.

The Serbians and Poles were part of the Pan-Slavic Sokol organizations, along with other Slavic nations.

In March 1914, Serbian, French, Polish and Greek allied troops landed at Odessa. In the early fall of 1918, an Allied account said that Serbs and Poles in a region from the Urals to Volga had been recruited by a French officer. In 1918, Serbs and Poles together with Chinese, were part of the "Officer's Corps", a unit of the Russian Consul at Harbin.

The League of Yugoslavia–Poland (Liga Jugoslavija-Poljska) was active in the Interwar period, aimed at economical and cultural cooperation with Poland. The League was not a diaspora organization, although it gathered also a small number of Yugoslav Poles at its seat in Uzun Mirko Street 5 in Belgrade, especially during national and Catholic holidays. Members of the League helped Polish soldiers and civilians who in autumn 1939 fled from Romania via Yugoslavia to the West.

Serbs and Poles were some of the major Slavic victims of Nazi German war crimes in Europe. Nazi Germany considered all Poles and Serbs as Untermensch, meaning "subhumans". Many ethnic Poles and ethnic Serbs died in concentration camps, or during retaliative guerrilla fights. Poles joined the Yugoslav Partisans in the beginning of the war. Immediately after the outbreak of the World War II some tens of Polish women with their Serbian husbands arrived in Serbia; they had met at forced labor and concentration camps in Germany. Yugoslav Partisans were often compared to the Polish Underground State and the Polish Resistance Movement which was the largest anti-Nazi guerrilla movement in all of German-occupied Europe. Ethnic Serbian prisoners of war were among Allied POWs held in German POW camps operated in occupied Poland.

In the mountains of Serbia in the years 1942–43 there were three Polish companies attached to the Chetnik Corps. The Rules of Chetnik Warfare was first published in Polish, then translated into Serbian.

On 1 June 1944, a Balkan Air Force was established by the British. It had mostly British, but also Italian, a Yugoslav squadron, and a Polish flight.

=== Contemporary period ===
15 April 2010 was declared a day of national mourning in Serbia to commemorate the 96 victims of the Smolensk air disaster, including Polish President Lech Kaczyński and his wife Maria Kaczyńska.

In November 2021, Poland donated 200,000 COVID-19 vaccines to Serbia.

A large number of terrorist threats sent to Serbia from Poland occurred in year 2022, which targeted schools, hospitals, dormitories, museums, stadiums, embassies, shopping malls, water plants, planes and more. Serbian president claimed that one EU country secret service is involved. Polish side didn't try to catch those responsible. Two Polish citizens were arrested for filming Serbian arms factory Sloboda.

Prime Minister Donald Tusk visited Belgrade in 2024 and delivered a speech in Serbian.

== Poland's stance on Kosovo ==
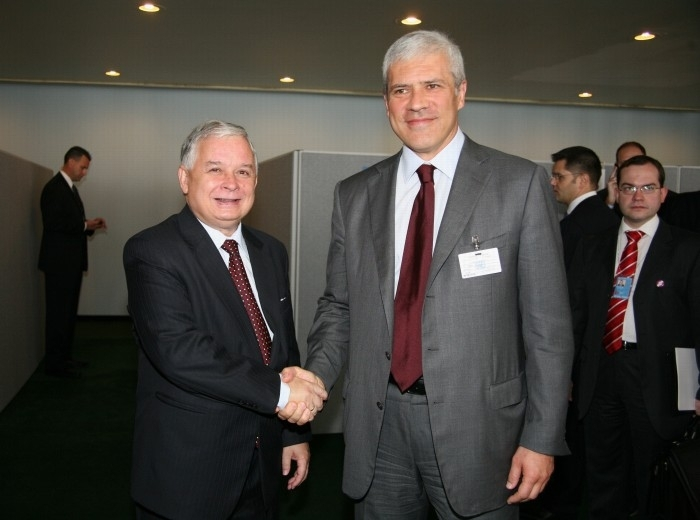
Boris Tadić meeting with Lech Kaczyński, at the 63rd UN General Assembly session, 2008

Polish opinion on NATO intervention in Federal Republic of Yugoslavia during the Kosovo War (1998–99) was mixed: 37% favoured involvement while 43% were against. The government decided in favor of a NATO-led operation to bring cease-fire in the conflict. During the NATO bombing of Yugoslavia in May 1999, a poll found 51% felt attacks to be justified, 26% opposed. Another poll found 53% in favour and 35% opposed.

Kosovo declared its independence from Serbia on 17 February 2008 and Poland recognized it on 26 February 2008. Poland was the first Slavic country to do so.

In September 2008, President of Poland, Lech Kaczyński, stated that the original cause of the 2008 South Ossetia war was not the Georgian operation, but the recognition of Kosovo's independence and that he would block attempts to establish diplomatic relations of Poland with Kosovo at ambassadorial level; however, the government has not proposed to send an ambassador to Priština.

The recognition of Kosovo independence has been criticized in Poland. Dozens of protests and demonstrations have been organized by various groups in Poland in support of the Serbian cause in Kosovo, with some attracting up to 1,500 to 2,000 people. An organization called "Poles for Serbian Kosovo" was formed in order to provide and support for Serbs in Kosovo.

As of 2009, Poland had 274 troops serving in Kosovo as peacekeepers in the NATO-led Kosovo Force, down from 800 Polish troops in 2005.

== Economic relations ==
Trade between two countries amounted to $2.2 billion in 2023; Serbia's merchandise export to Poland were about $961 million; Polish exports were standing at roughly $1.2 billion.

Polish companies present in Serbia include Pepco (operating 35 variety stores) and Tele-Fonika Kable (owner of Zaječar Cable Factory in Zaječar).

== Cultural relations ==
The Polish and Serbian languages, both part of the Slavic languages (western and southern branches, respectively), are related and partially mutually intelligible.

Due to huge popularity of the Yugoslav rock scene in Poland in the 1970s and 1980s, many Yugoslav artists toured Poland. Serbian rock band Električni orgazam recorded a live album titled Warszawa "'81'" to support the Polish opposition against Wojciech Jaruzelski. These connections in the 1980s led to albums being produced in Poland based on covers of popular Serbian rock bands with the albums Yugoton and Yugopolis covering artists such as Bajaga i Instruktori, Idoli and Električni orgazam.

The Kayah i Bregović-album by Polish singer-songwriter Kayah and Serbian musician Goran Bregović became a bestseller after its release in 1999.

== Poles in Serbia ==
The largest part of the Polonia (Polish diaspora) in Serbia is made up of women who married in Yugoslavia in the 1960s and 70s. During the Yugoslav wars, when Yugoslavia broke up, many Polish and their families either returned to Poland or emigrated to the West. According to the 2022 Serbian census, there are 615 Poles in Serbia. These are individuals born in Poland, as well as their descendants from mixed marriages. Apart from Belgrade, larger numbers exist in Niš, Novi Sad, Kraljevo, Vrnjačka Banja, and Subotica. The only community regarded starosedeoci ("natives"), is the one inhabiting Ostojićevo in northern Serbia, having settled in the mid-19th century from the Wisła.

Serbian aviators Tadija Sondermajer and Stanislav Sondermajer, the youngest fighter in the Battle of Cer in 1914, were of paternal Polish descent. Serbian officer and journalist Stanislav Krakov (1895–1968) had a father of Polish origin. Journalist and military analyst Miroslav Lazanski is of paternal Polish ancestry. Film director and political commentator Boris Malagurski is of distant paternal Polish ancestry.

== Serbs in Poland ==
Serbs in Poland are a small, mainly expat, community. According to data from 2021 census, there were 1,149 ethnic Serbs citizens in Poland.

== Resident diplomatic missions ==
- Poland has an embassy in Belgrade.
- Serbia has an embassy in Warsaw.
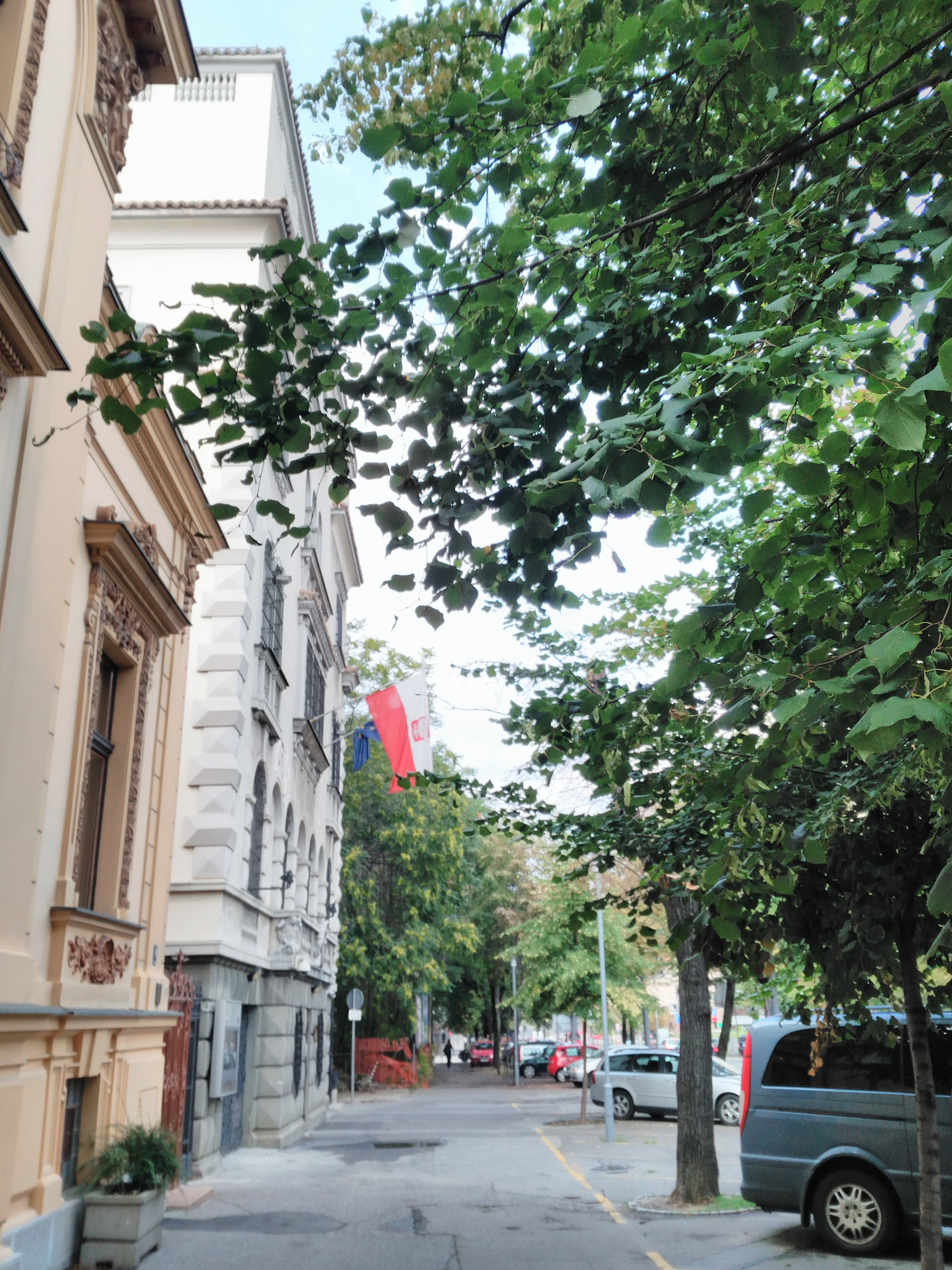
Embassy of Poland in Belgrade

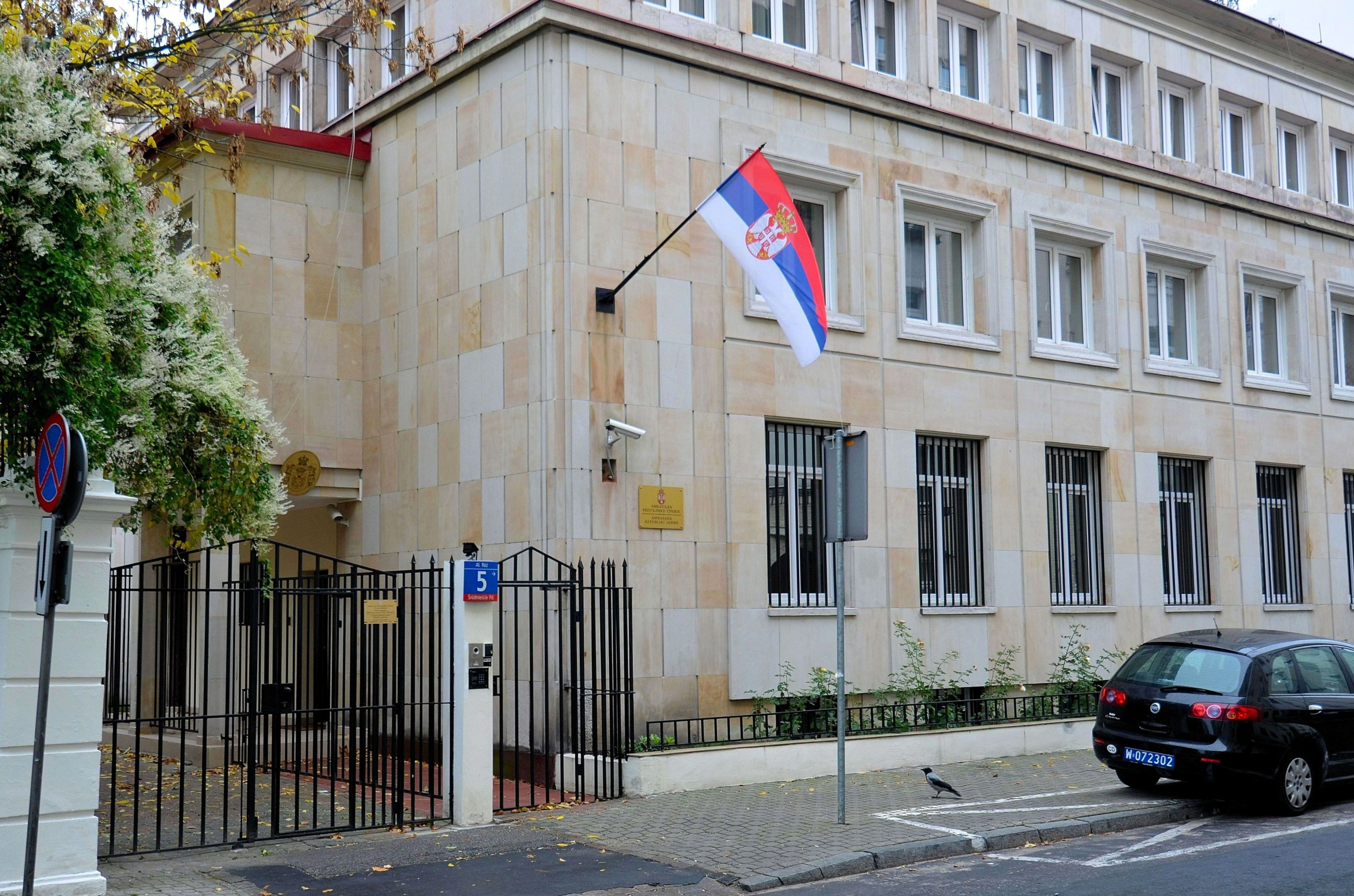
Embassy of Serbia in Warsaw

== See also ==
- Foreign relations of Poland
- Foreign relations of Serbia
- Serbia–NATO relations
- Accession of Serbia to the EU
- Poland–Yugoslavia relations
