= Tadija =

Tadija (Serbian Cyrillic: Тадија) is a Serbian masculine given name, derived from the Greek name Thaddaios. Notable people with the name include:

- Tadija Dragićević (born 1986), Serbian basketball player
- Tadija Kačar (born 1956), Serbian boxer
- Tadija Smičiklas (1843–1914), Croatian historian and politician
- Tadija Sondermajer (1892–1967), Serbian and Yugoslav Royal Air Force Reserve Colonel
- Tadija Tadić (born 1999), Serbian basketball player
