= Dimitrije Đurić =

General Dimitrije Đurić
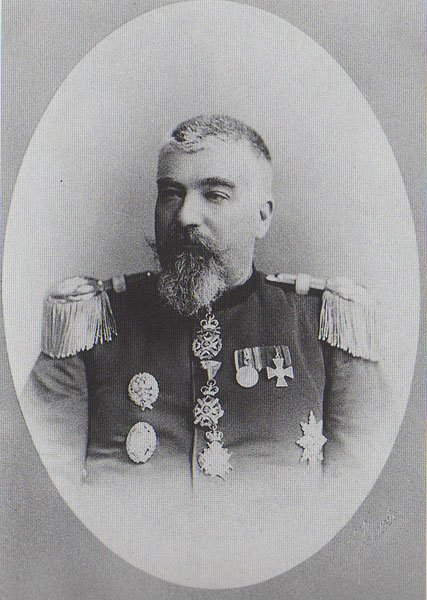
- General Dimitrije Đurić in 1891

Minister of War
- In office 2 February 1890 – 16 March 1890

Minister of War
- In office 21 March 1892 – 9 August 1892

Personal details
- Born: 29 September 1838 Belgrade, Principality of Serbia
- Died: 19 October 1893 (aged 55) Belgrade, Kingdom of Serbia

Military service
- Allegiance: Principality of Serbia; Kingdom of Serbia
- Years of service: 1862–1893
- Rank: General
- Battles/wars: Serbo-Turkish War; Serbo Bulgarian War

Dimitrije Đurić (Serbian Cyrillic: Димитрије Ђурић; 29 September 1838 – 19 October 1893) was a Serbian army officer, minister of defence, professor at the military academy and member of the Serbian Royal Academy of Science. He also served as 8th Dean of the Academic Board of the Military Academy in Serbia and its chief on two occasions, 1887-1889 and 1891-1893.

== Biography ==
As an artillery officer in training Dimitrije Đurić spent the period 1865-67 in Russia at Tsar Nicholas I General Staff Academy. In Russia, Durić participated in the founding of Srpska opština (Serbian commune), he became its president while another artillery officer, and future prime minister, Sava Grujić its vice-president and radical-socialist Svetozar Marković its secretary. The goal of the Commune, was "the establishment of fraternal relations among all Serbs in Russia", with a view to “cooperation for the general progress of the Serbian people and nation”.

== Personal life ==
Dimitrije Đurić was married to Persida Matić, daughter of Minister of Education Dimitri Matić. They had three sons: Captain of artillery Milan Đurić (died at the battle of Vranje in 1911), Miloš Đurić and Velizar Đurić, and four daughters: Stanislava married to Colonel Dr Roman Sondermajer (children: Vladislaw Sondermajer, Lieutenant Colonel of aviation; Tadija Sondermajer, famous pilot of the Great War and founder of Aeroput; Stanislav Sondermajer, youngest hero of the battle of Cer and daughter Jadviga); Dragica married to Vladimir Sajnović; author Spasenija Pata Markovic married to Major Djordje Ristić and Ljubica married to Lieutenant Colonel Mihailo Naumović.

== Awards and decorations ==
=== Principality of Serbia ===
- Order of the Cross of Takovo Grand Officer's Cross 3rd Class with Swords
- Order of the Cross of Takovo Officer's Cross 5th Class
- Order of the Cross of Takovo Grand Cross 2nd Class
- Order Sv. Sava Commander
- Silver medal for bravery
- War of Liberation and Independence 1876-1878 Commemorative Medal
- War of 1885 Commemorative Medal

=== Foreign ===
- Order of Saint Stanislaus, 3rd Class Russia
- Order of Saint Anna 4th Class, Russia
- Order of Independence, Montenegro

== Works ==
- Strategy (Tactics of War) Publisher: Ministry of Military Kingdom of Serbia 1895
