= Military Hospital, Vračar =

Military Hospital Vračar
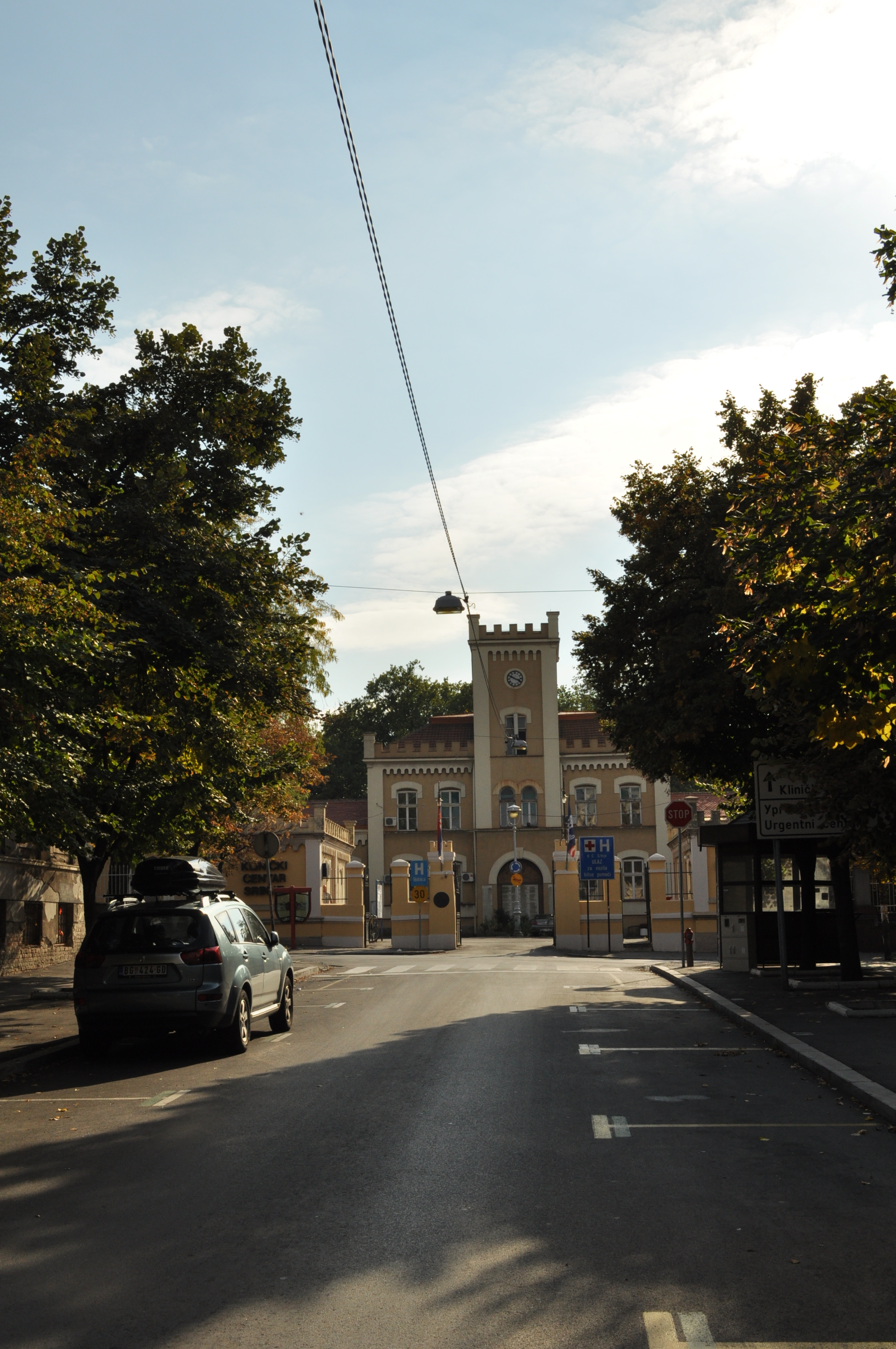
- Entrance of Military Hospital Vračar

Geography
- Location: Savski Venac, Belgrade, Serbia
- Coordinates: 44.800232°N 20.4577016°E

History
- Founded: 1909; 117 years ago

Military Hospital at Vračar (Serbian Cyrillic: Војна болница на Врачару, Vojna bolnica na Vračaru) is located in Belgrade, in the territory of the city municipality of Savski Venac, built in the period from 1904 to 1909. It represents an immovable cultural property as a cultural monument.

== History ==
Dr Roman Sondermajer came to Serbia from Poland in 1889, and in his autobiography he wrote that "the hospital and opportunities I found there made a terrible impression". In the same year, 1889, Dr Sondermajer initiated the construction of a new hospital, and the works started in 1903. Then the Belgrade municipality offered land at "Western Vračar" to the military in exchange for the land on which Palilula barrack stood.

In its original form, the newly built hospital survived despite the bombing in World War I, with no major damage reported. During the second half of the 1920s, new equipment was received from Germany in the name of war reparations, so that the reconstruction and extension of the existing hospital pavilion seemed necessary. The reconstruction of the complex was completed in 1930 and then the "Military Hospital" was officially opened for the second time.

The first reconstruction did not damage the functional circuit, nor its appearance. Another extensive and stylistically incoherent complex reconstruction was done in the postwar period, especially in the early 1960s. Some pavilions were completely refurbished, and some were upgraded. Among the buildings which were not damaged in the war destruction and the later additions are the central building of the administration together with the ensemble of the main entrance. The Administration Building is partially a single-storey building and partially a multi-storey building (in the central avant-corps), with a central two-storey tower. The former central entrance was walled up, and the internal arrangement of space in this central part was renovated, so that currently, the building is entered through wing tracts.

== Architecture ==
Urban development of the Clinical Center of Serbia started in the mid-19th century on land which was framed on the west and the south side by a green belt and on the east side by free space, where the clinics of the Medical School were after the First World War. Within the hospital grounds, a significant part of the area was planted and covered by a park.

The construction of the complex of the Military Hospital in an area of about 8 hectares (20 acres), was entrusted to the architect Danilo Vladisavljević, who was in the service in the Ministry of Military at the time. It was an example of a modern architectural concept of the hospital of pavilion type and the first continentally-achieved spatial composition based on double symmetrical buildings and architecturally-solved main entrance, set in the axis of Svetozar Marković Street.

This caused change in the regulation plan of Belgrade: abolition of the extension of Resavska Street, Svetozar Marković, Kralj Milutin and Višegrad Street and the creation of five new blocks in the area of the hospital. The position of the Administration Building of the Military Hospital marked and gave a remarkable silhouette to Western Vračar. The complex includes 12 buildings, and, as a unique ensemble, is an example of a successful architectural achievement, both from the aspect of the utilitarian and architectural aesthetics, with a special place in the history of urban planning of Belgrade. Under the influence of the German school, Vladisavljević applied Romanesque style, which was typical for this type of building in Germany. In addition, the application of reduced decoration elements is also noted.

Compared with similar institutions in the world, the Military Hospital, at the time when it was built, was representative of the most modern stylistic expression. The functionality of the interior space maximally satisfied the most demanding requirements of the medical service at the beginning of the last century, and well designed solutions and compliance of architecture with the purpose have still not been entirely overcome until today. In the period of its construction, this complex received high recognition by domestic and foreign experts and was considered the most modern hospital in the Balkans.

== Significance ==
All buildings, especially the administration building of the hospital, were designed stylishly unique, following the methods of neo-Romanticism. The historical significance of this complex is multifaceted, as a representative achievement of its time and society to its importance in the Balkan and the First World War. As a medical center, not only military, but also of importance for the development of the medical corps of Serbia and Belgrade, the Military Hospital trained the best staff, and as an educational center, it was the nucleus from which the Меdical Faculty of the University of Belgrade developed.
