= Poland–Yugoslavia relations =

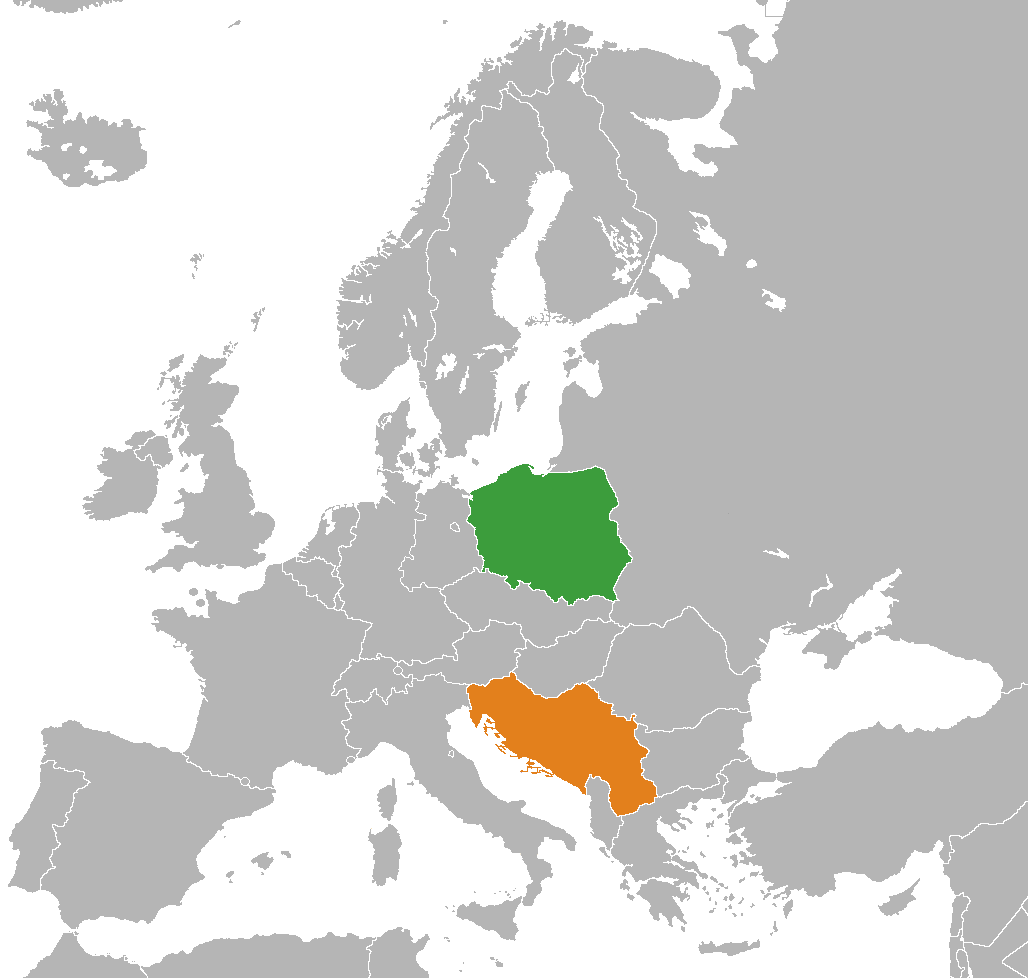

- Poland: Yugoslavia

Poland–Yugoslavia relations (Polish: Stosunki Polska – Jugosławia; Serbian: Односи Пољске и Југославије; Croatian: Odnosi Poljske i Jugoslavije; Slovene: Odnosi med Poljsko in Jugoslavijo; Macedonian: Односите меѓу Полска и Југославија) were historical foreign relations between Poland (both Second Polish Republic 1918-1939 and the Polish People's Republic 1947–1989) and now broken up Yugoslavia (Kingdom of Yugoslavia 1918-1941 and Socialist Federal Republic of Yugoslavia 1945–1992).

== History ==
=== Interbellum and World War II ===
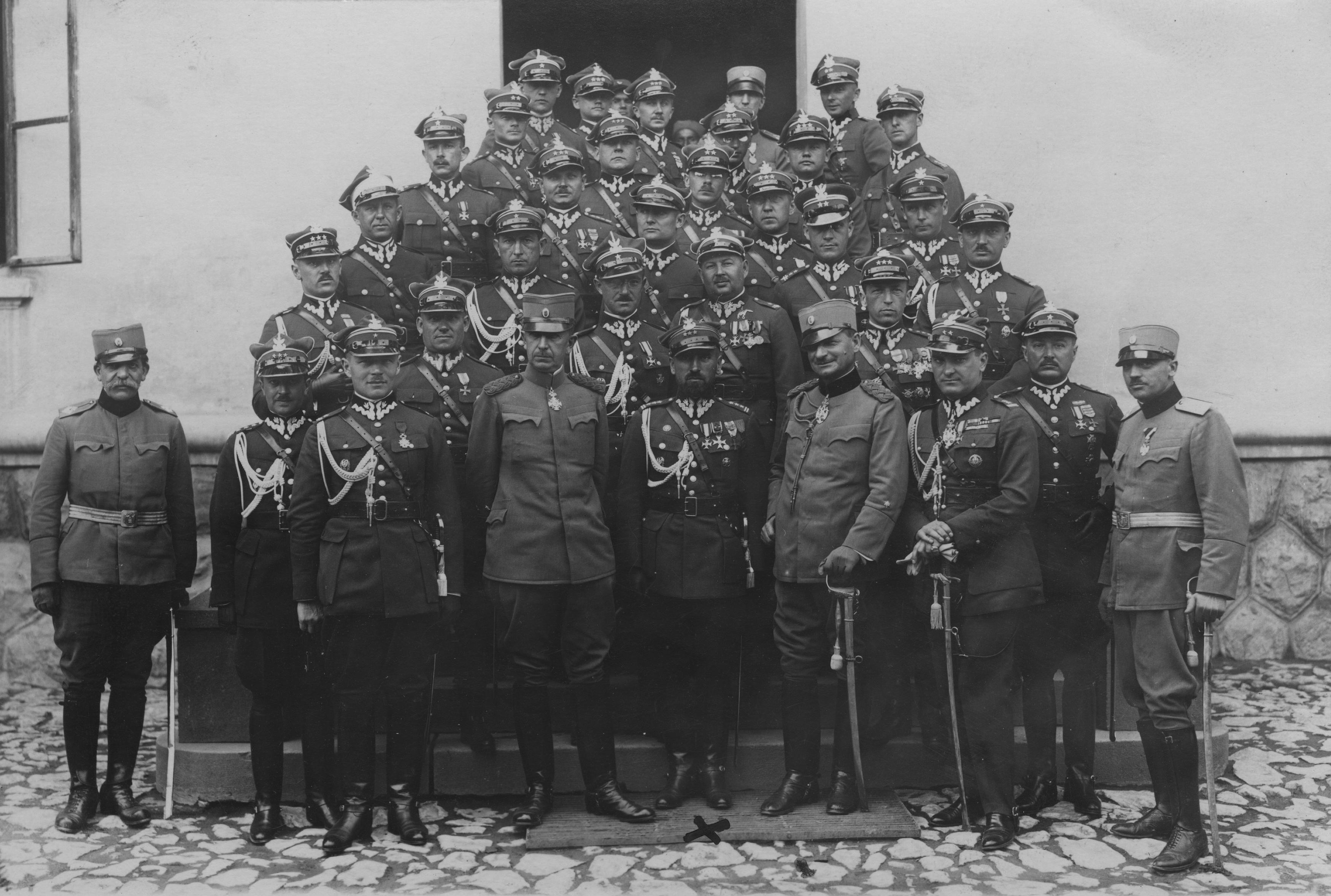
Polish and Yugoslav military officers in 1928

Two countries established their relations in the interwar period when Poland regained its independence for the first time after the partitions while Yugoslavia was created after the unification of pre-World War I Kingdom of Serbia with the State of Slovenes, Croats and Serbs (former South Slavic parts of the Austria-Hungary). In the days before this unification Kingdom of Serbia merged with the Banat, Bačka and Baranja and the Kingdom of Montenegro.

During the German-Soviet invasion of Poland, which started World War II in 1939, Yugoslavia declared neutrality. Despite this, some of the escape routes of Poles who fled from occupied Poland to Hungary and Romania led through Yugoslavia. Local citizens and the Yugoslav Red Cross aided the Polish refugees. The Poles then further escaped via Italy and Greece to Polish-allied France, where the Polish Army was reconstituted to continue the fight against Germany. Eventually, Yugoslavia, fearing Germany, became reluctant to further allow Poles to evacuate through its territory, causing the escape route to be diverted to Bulgaria. In 1941, Yugoslavia was eventually also invaded by Germany. Citizens of Yugoslavia were among the prisoners of German prisoner-of-war camps, concentration camps and forced labour camps in German-occupied Poland. Poles were imprisoned in a subcamp of the Mauthausen concentration camp at the Ljubelj Pass in German-occupied Yugoslavia. During the war both countries suffered heavy casualties and developed the Polish resistance movement and the Yugoslav Partisans movement.

After the war, over 15,000 Poles were repatriated from Yugoslavia to Poland.

=== Post-war period ===
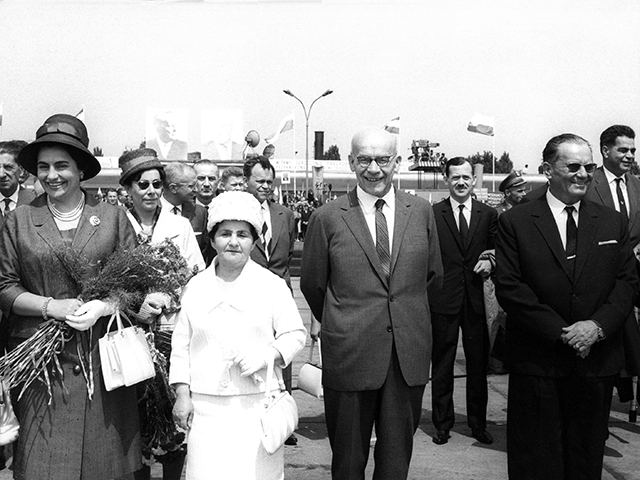
President Tito in Warsaw (1964).

After the end of the war until the 1948 two countries were in the Soviet sphere of influence. In 1946 two countries signed the Agreement on Friendship and Mutual Assistance. While the Polish Workers' Party needed a couple of years and Soviet support to gain the power in the country, Communist Party of Yugoslavia was able to establish control over the country already in 1945 without any significant Soviet support. This led new Yugoslav authorities to expect the status of an ally instead of a satellite state within the Eastern Bloc. Situation escalated in 1948 Tito–Stalin split after which Yugoslav relations with all Eastern Bloc countries, including Poland, were either suspended or significantly strained. Situation improved following the 1955 Belgrade declaration yet at this stage Yugoslavia was on the course of development of its Cold War non-aligned foreign policy. Relations of Poland normalized with significant number of Polish tourists spending their summer holidays on the Adriatic coast primarily in the Socialist Republic of Croatia. Formal cultural cooperation was reinitiated on the basis of the agreement signed in Belgrade on July 6, 1956. The relations were once again broken for some time during the 1968 Warsaw Pact invasion of Czechoslovakia when two countries were on the opposite sides in the conflict.

== See also ==
- Yugoslavia–European Communities relations
- Croatia–Poland relations
- Poland–Serbia relations
- Poles in Bosnia and Herzegovina
- Poles of Croatia
- Poles in Serbia
- Macedonians in Poland
- 2019 Western Balkans Summit, Poznań
- Death and state funeral of Josip Broz Tito
- Poland at the 1984 Winter Olympics
- Contemporary Art Museum of Macedonia
- Poland–Soviet Union relations
