= Croatia–Poland relations =

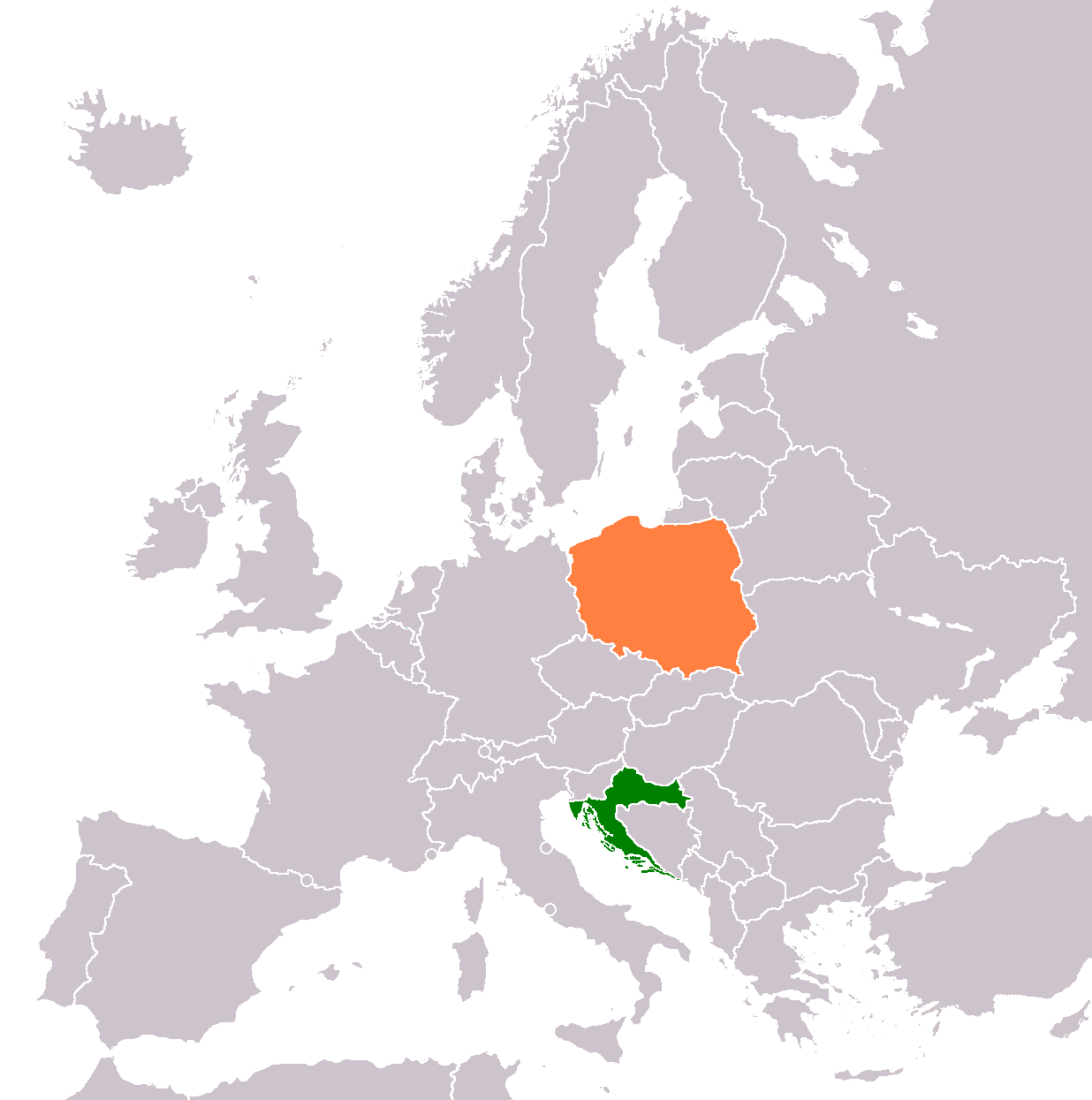

- Croatia: Poland

Diplomatic mission
- Embassy of Croatia, Warsaw: Embassy of Poland, Zagreb

Croatia–Poland relations are bilateral relations between Croatia and Poland. Both countries are full members of the European Union, NATO, OECD, OSCE, Three Seas Initiative and the Council of Europe. Poland gave full support to Croatia's membership in the European Union and NATO.

== History ==
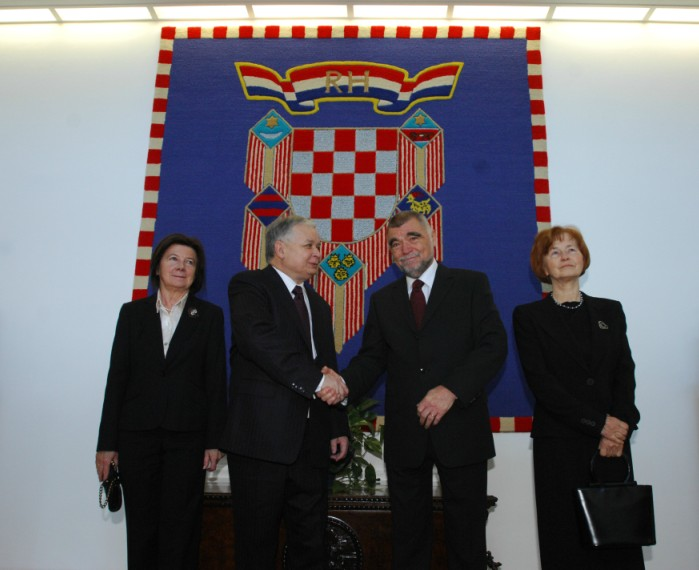
Meeting of President of Poland Lech Kaczyński and President of Croatia Stjepan Mesić in 2008

Up until the 20th century, Poland's relations with Croatia was mostly conducted throughout the relations between Poland and various entities ruling Croatia, notably Poland's relations with Hungary, Austria and Yugoslavia. Poland and Croatia were united by a personal union under the union of Hungary and Poland during the reign of kings Louis I of Hungary in 1370–1382, and Władysław III of Poland in 1440–1444. Poles and Croats fought side by side against the Ottoman invasion of Europe in several battles, including at Nicopolis (1396), Varna (1444) and Mohács (1526).

In the interbellum, a Consulate-General of Poland was based in Zagreb, and honorary consulates of Poland were located in Dubrovnik, Split and Sušak.

Following the German-Soviet invasion of Poland, which started World War II in 1939, one the escape routes of Poles who initially fled from occupied Poland to Romania led through Vinkovci and Zagreb. The Poles then further escaped via Italy to Polish-allied France, where the Polish Army was reconstituted to continue the fight against Germany.

Poland recognized Croatia on 15 January 1992 along with 16 other, mostly European countries. Diplomatic relations between two countries were established on 11 April 1992.

During the Yugoslav Wars, the Croatian 103rd Infantry Brigade received a small number of Polish volunteers. In 1992–1995, a Polish military contingent was stationed in Croatia as part of the peacekeeping mission of the United Nations Protection Force. Since 2018, a Croatian military contingent has been stationed in Poland as part of the NATO Enhanced Forward Presence defense forces.

18 April 2010, the day of the state funeral of Lech and Maria Kaczyński, was declared a day of national mourning in Croatia to commemorate the 96 victims of the Smolensk air disaster, including Polish President Lech Kaczyński and his wife Maria Kaczyńska.

Poles are an officially recognized national minority of Croatia.

== NATO and the European Union ==
Poland joined NATO and the EU in 1999, and 2004, respectively. Poland supported Croatia's aspiration to join NATO, and ratified Croatia's accession in 2008. Poland supported Croatia's aspiration to join the EU, and ratified Croatia's accession in 2012. Croatia joined NATO in 2009 and the EU in 2013.

== Resident diplomatic missions ==
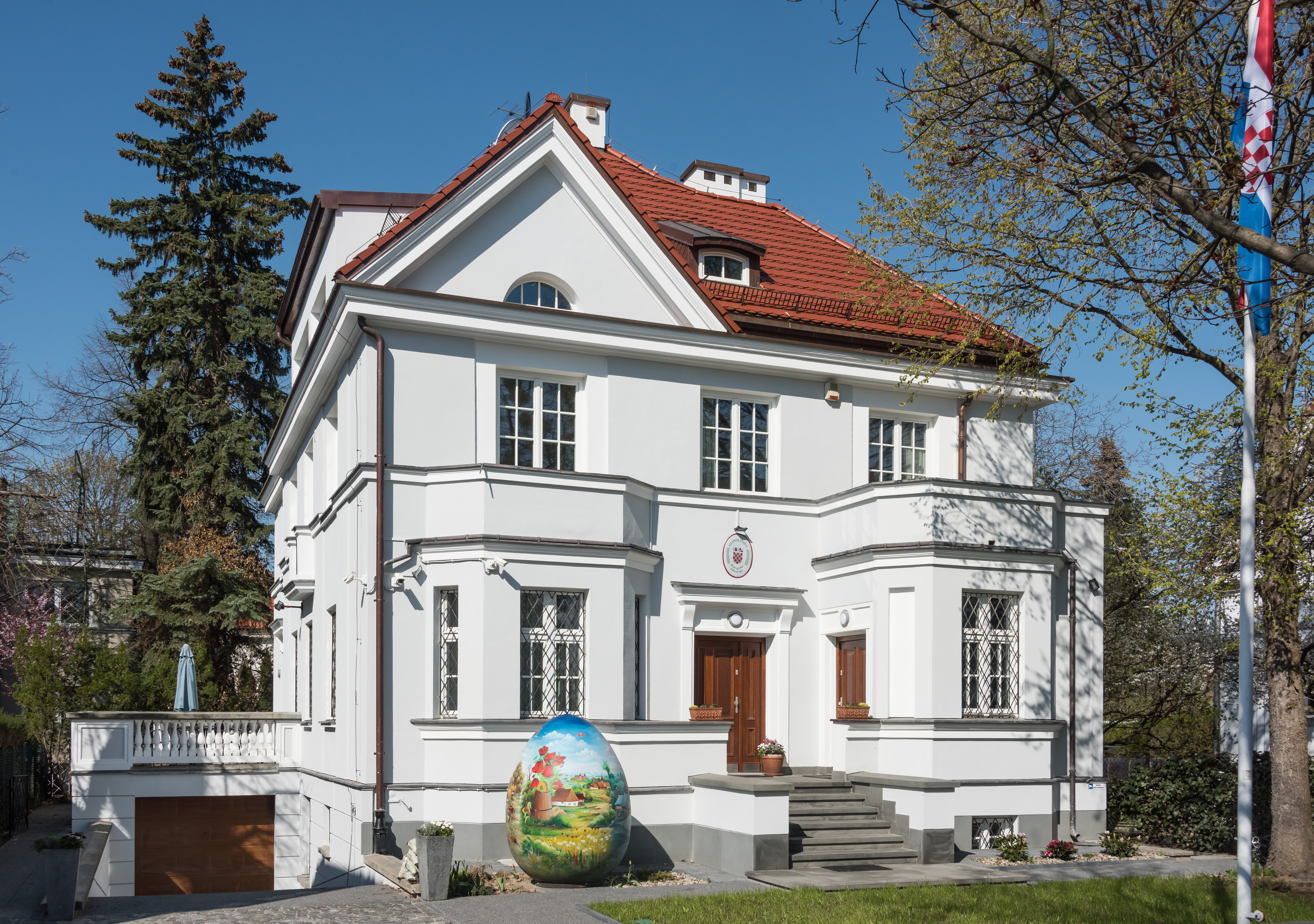
Embassy of Croatia in Warsaw

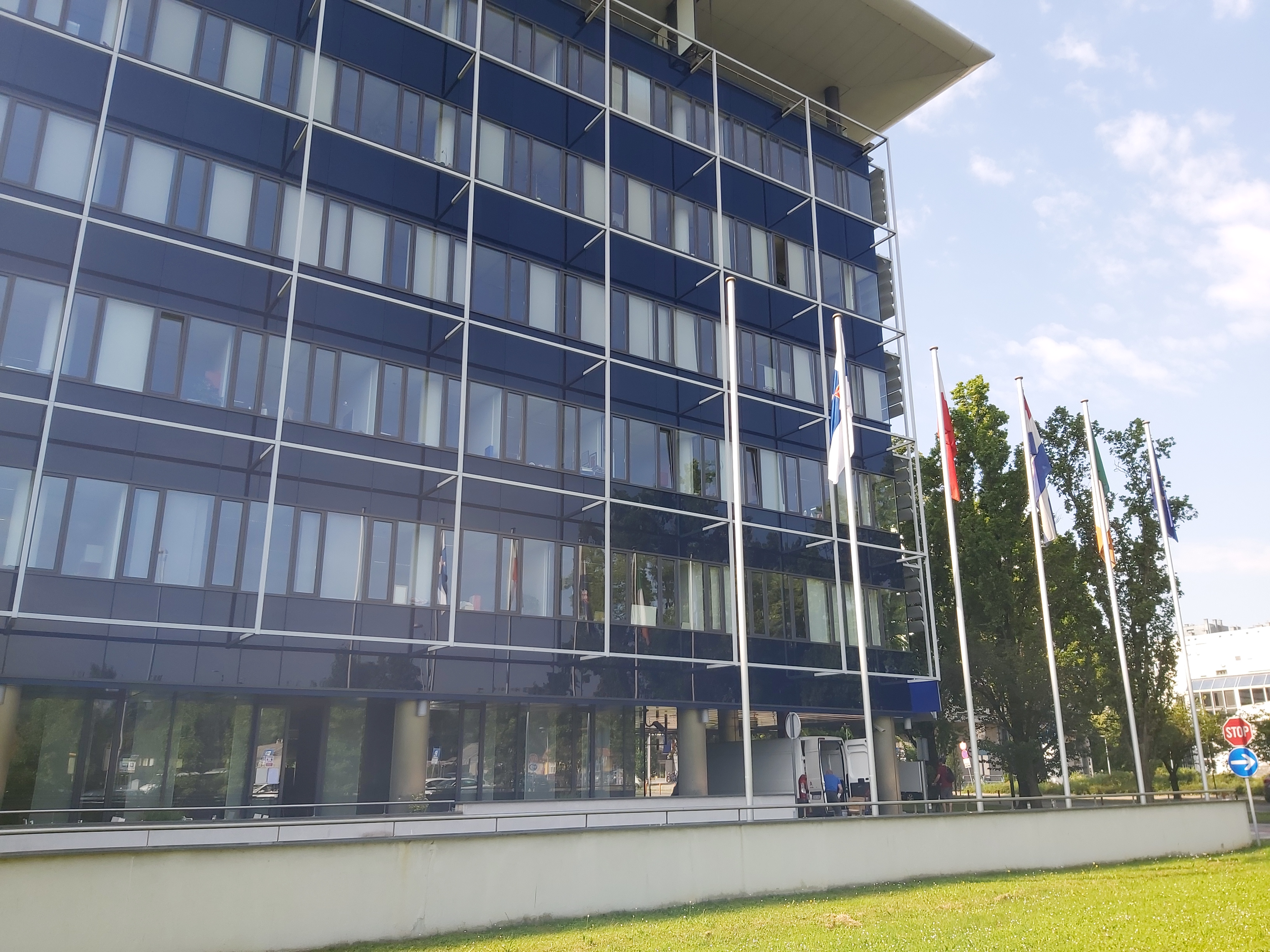
Embassy of Poland in Zagreb

- Croatia has an embassy in Warsaw.
- Poland has an embassy in Zagreb.

== See also ==
- Poles in Croatia
- Foreign relations of Croatia
- Foreign relations of Poland
- Poland–Yugoslavia relations
