= Spasenija Pata Marković =

Serbian cookbook author

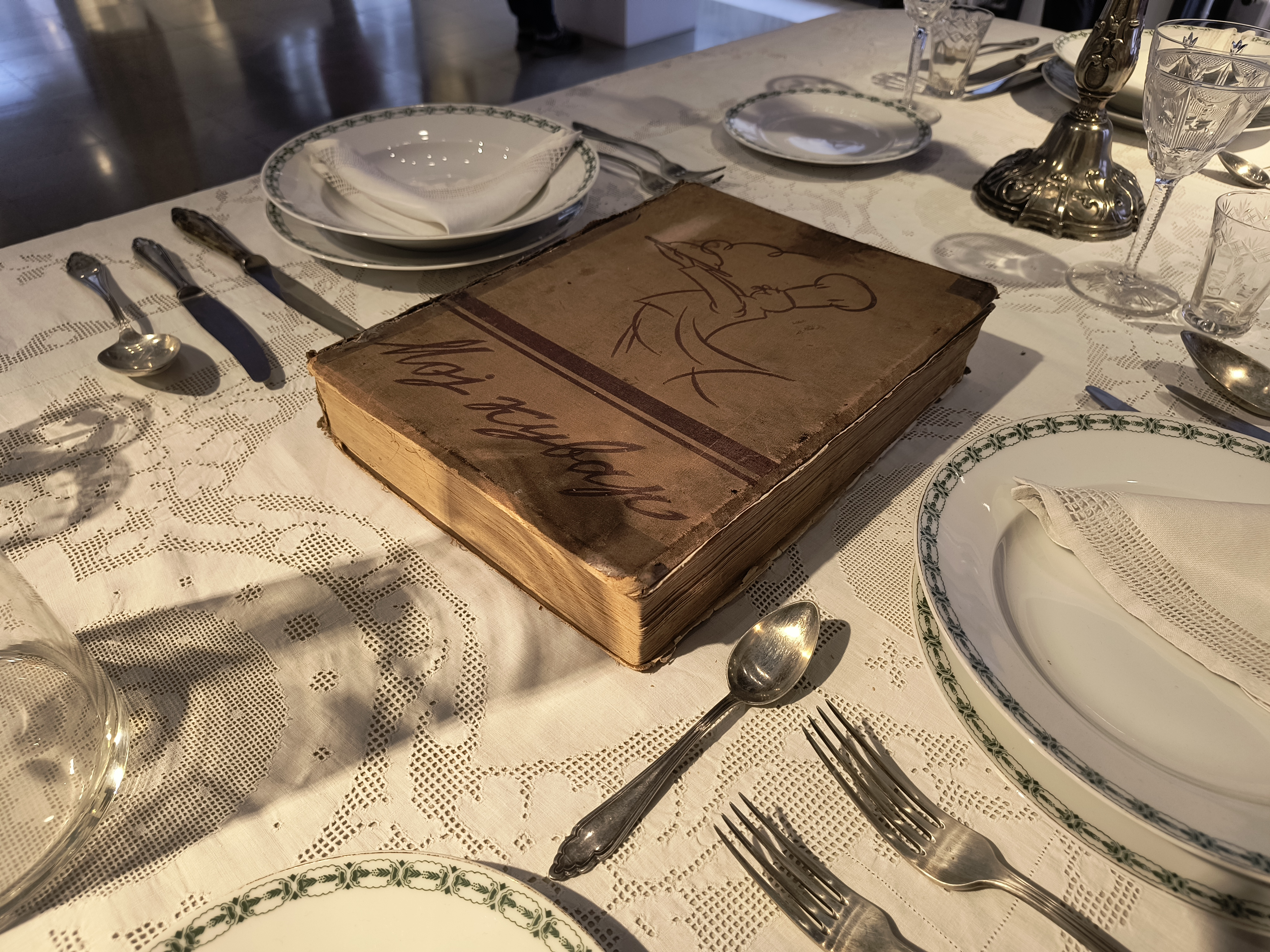
"My cookbook" by Spasenija Pata Marković in Ethnographic museum in Belgrade

Spasenija Pata Marković (Serbian Cyrillic: Спасенија Пата Марковић; 31 December 1881 – 1974) was a Serbian cookbook author. She is considered the author of the most extensive collection of culinary recipes written in Serbia. This cookbook was published in 1939 under the title My Cookbook, and was later better known as Pata's Cookbook. In 1956, the publishing house Narodna knjiga published Veliki narodni kuvar based on her original cookbook, which by that time had about 20 editions. The introduction to this new edition reads: "This book is based on the famous book My Cookbook, which was published by the newspaper Politika before the war, and edited by Spasenija Pata Marković." The "Great National Cookbook" contains all the recipes of the pre-war edition of the mentioned book, with some other tips.

Some historians rank Marković among the first learned women in Serbia to fight for equal rights for both women and men among all strata of society.

== Early life ==
Marković was born as Spasenija Djurić on 31 December 1881. Pata's father, Dimitrije Đurić, was a general, Minister of War and a member of the Serbian Academy of Sciences, while her mother Persida was the daughter of Dimitrije Matić, Minister of Justice and Education, and a member of the Serbian Literary Society. Marković received first-class upbringing and education: she was educated in Vienna, where she graduated from a famous school for housewives and became an excellent cook, and in addition to the skills of running a household, she also acquired top manners of communication in society.

Upon her return from Vienna, Spasenija married infantry major Đorđe Ristić and had two children with him: daughter Ljubica, born in 1902, and son Dušan, born in 1904 (Pata's son Dušan was a cavalry major and was killed by the Germans in Banjica in 1943). She later married physician Zoran Marković. In the period after the Second World War, she lived surrounded by her family. She died in Belgrade in 1974.

== Career ==
Marković published her first collection of recipes, Cook and Advisor, in 1907. She was the manager of the Home Course of the Belgrade Women's Association and the Women's Crafts School, where she spread the views and ideas she had brought from Vienna. Life in the Austrian metropolis led her to propagate the European way of life in the country and the principle that Serbian women should finish school and free themselves from slavery created by kitchen walls around them. She was also a great supporter of modern medicine. She also ran a canteen where a hundred people, mostly school children, ate every day. She was also an active member of the Circle of Serbian Sisters.

In 1937, she began editing a daily column for housewives in the newspaper Politika. She invited readers to send recipes of forgotten old dishes and specific dishes of the region in which they lived, and thus gathered a huge treasury of culinary specialties that she carefully studied, personally tried and shaped. The Politika editorial office received thousands of letters, and many families cooked according to the menu suggested to them by Markovic for the day. Her wish was that readers, in addition to advice on cooking, could gain knowledge about food hygiene—the nutritional and caloric value of foods.

Two years later, in 1939, her famous book My Cook was published, incorporating recipes sent in to her newspaper column. The book became known as Pata's Cook. The cookbook contained more than 4,000 recipes. By the beginning of the Second World War, Marković had published three cookbooks and 15 volumes of various recipes.

It was noted in public that she hid Jewish children in her house during the war, but also that advanced ideas and bourgeois origins led to her arrest after the end of the war, all her property was nationalized, and her name was removed from public life. Everything that had anything to do with Pat was forbidden and concealed, all subsequent editions, published after 1945, were signed only with "SM". However, as she was the only educated housewife, she was allowed to work, run schools for women and teach them good manners, table manners and the basics of civic cuisine, adapted to the "working world".

Due to her advanced ideas, Marković was perceived as a dissident even before the Second World War. During the 1920s and 1930s, her textbook for housewives was published once a week. It was also published during the dictatorship of Aleksandar Karađorđević, when, as a weekly, it was the only book that was published without censorship. On one occasion, Pata's brother made ironic comments about the king and the dictatorship through recipes. As a result, the weekly was banned, and Serbia became the only country that, at that time, banned a book that deals with cooking.

The Belgrade chronicler Branislav Nušić wrote about Marković as follows:

"The minister's daughter was the first learned housewife, with a diploma from the most recognized Viennese school for running a household. She decided to use the knowledge she acquired in the imperial city for the common good of her compatriots. She wanted to teach our ladies how to make their table tasty and varied, how to run a house and to understand why it is necessary for a housewife to become a respectable profession. She wanted to bring Serbia closer to the world and the world to Serbia. Already in 1907, according to the principles of Viennese and Hungarian households, she published the first - "Cookbook and Advisor". (...)

Ever since you entered her home, you can see that it is the home of a learned, Serbian lady who lacks nothing. One would think that a queen resides in it and that it has at least a dozen servants. However, Ms. Marković has only one maid, with whom she does the same chores around the house. When you see that in the manner of a great lady she behaves as if her home is the Court, until you talk to her you would not even believe in her modesty and the cheerful spirit with which she radiates.

== Sources ==
- Велики народни кувар [Great folk chef] (in Serbian) (2nd ed.). Belgrade: Народна књига. 1959.COBISS 233088775
