= Stanislav Sondermajer =

- Станислав Сондермајер
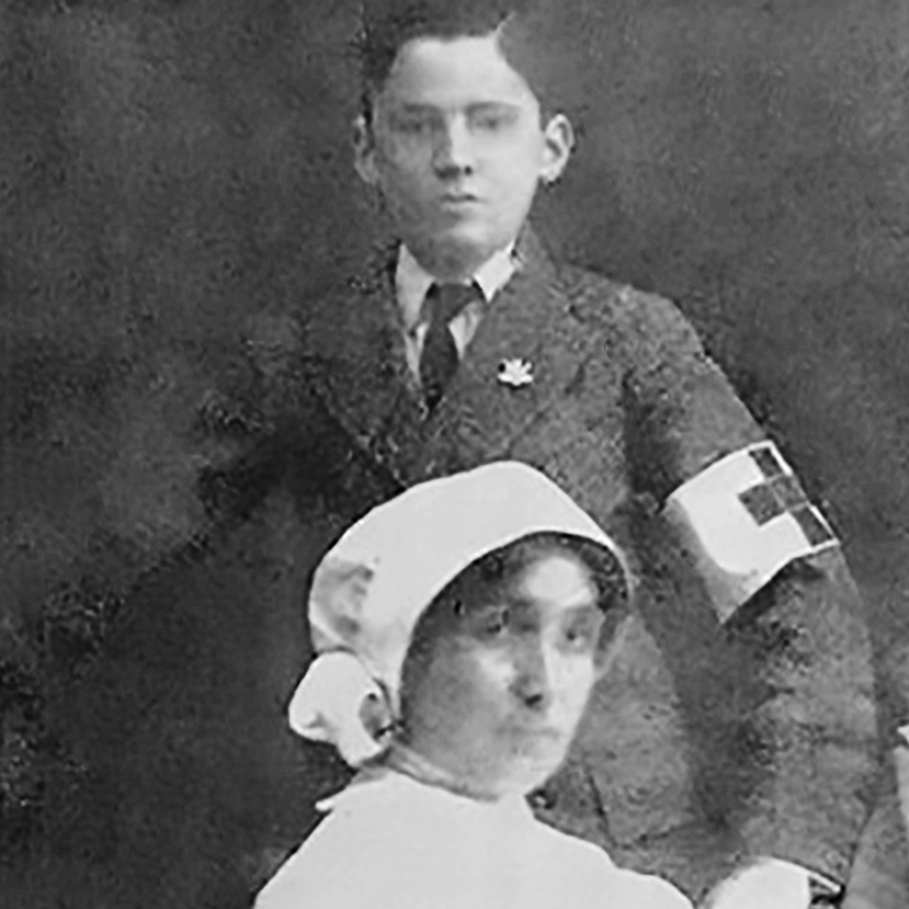
- Stanislav "Staško" Sondermajer
- Born: 5 September 1898; Belgrade, Kingdom of Serbia
- Died: 5 August 1914 (aged 15); Dobrić Kingdom of Serbia
- Military career
- Allegiance: Army of the Kingdom of Serbia
- Branch: Kingdom of Serbia
- Service years: 1914
- Conflicts: World War I, Battle of Cer

Stanislav "Staško" Sondermajer (5 September 1898 – 5 August 1914) was the youngest Serbian soldier killed at the beginning of the First World War during the Battle of Cer; he died on the battlefield at the age of 15.

== Early life ==
Stanislav Sondermayer was born on 5 September 1898 in Belgrade, in 1914 he was a sixth-grade student of the Second Belgrade Secondary School. He was the youngest of the Sondermayer family, son of surgeon Colonel Dr Roman Sondermajer, founder and director of the Serbian Army Medical Service, and of Stanislava Đurić Sondermayer, volunteer nurse in both Balkan Wars, daughter of General Dimitrije Đurić and grand-daughter of Dimitrije Matić. His siblings Tadija and Vladimir, were both junior officers at the outbreak of the war, having both served in the Balkan Wars of 1912 and 1913 (Vladimir only 4 years older than Stanislav had been decorated with a silver medal for courage) while his sister Jadviga was a volunteer nurse.

== War service and death ==
When war broke out on 12 July 1914, the men were preparing to go to the front following the Austro-Hungarian invasion; Stanislav eager to join the army to defend his homeland stood before his father seeking a blessing to go but his father refused as Stanislav was still too young.

Stanislav ran away from home to the border, he was taken in by a local volunteer group somewhere near Šabac; an experienced rider, he managed to enter the service in the Third Cavalry Regiment on July 16 under the command of Colonel Peter Savatic.

He participated in the Battle of Cer where he was fatally wounded on August 5, during a charge on the Austro-Hungarian corps near the village of Dobrić, exactly one month before his sixteenth birthday.

== Legacy ==
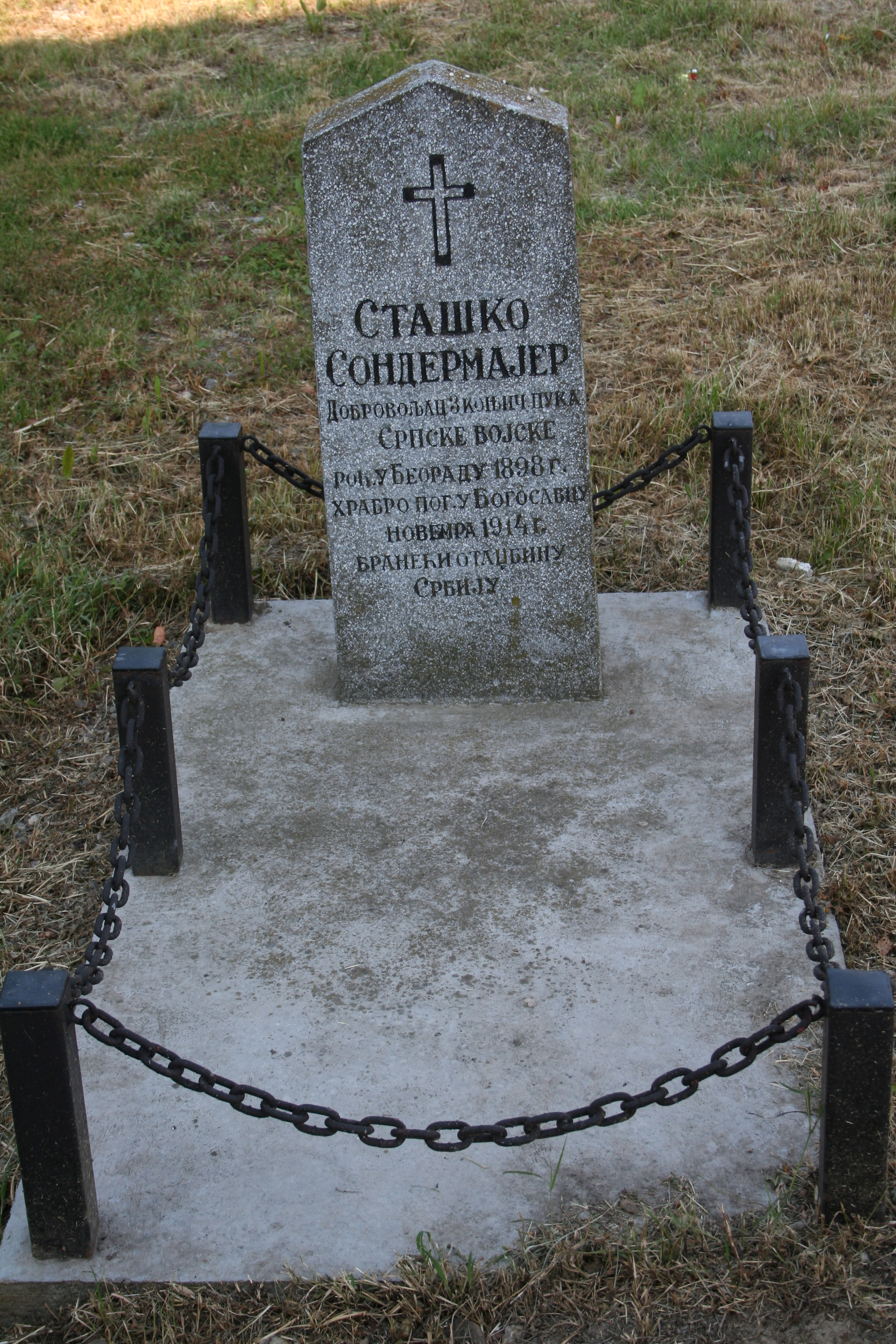
Stanislav Sondermajer's grave in Bogosavac

After the battle the women from the village of Bogosavac found his body and brought him back to the village to be buried; a diary wrapped in a handkerchief with Stanislav's notes was found on him. In them, he wrote about the death of his mother, two days after the mobilization, and his feelings from being at the front. His body was buried in the center of the village where a monument was later erected to the young hero. Isidora Sekulić wrote the song Tihestrofe, dedicated to Stanislav Sondermajer, while Historian prof. Miodrag Ibrovac, who was also his classmate, wrote:

A heartfelt regret, young, and so famous, the little hero of the Third Cavalry Regiment is living an eternal dream in the field of honour.

— Miodrag Ibrovac

On August 5, 2011, the remains of Stanislav were reburied in Bogosavac, after a memorial prayer service.

== See also ==
- Roman Sondermajer
- Tadija Sondermajer
