= Tadija Sondermajer =

Serbian and Yugoslav fighter pilot (1892–1967)

- Тадија Сондермајер
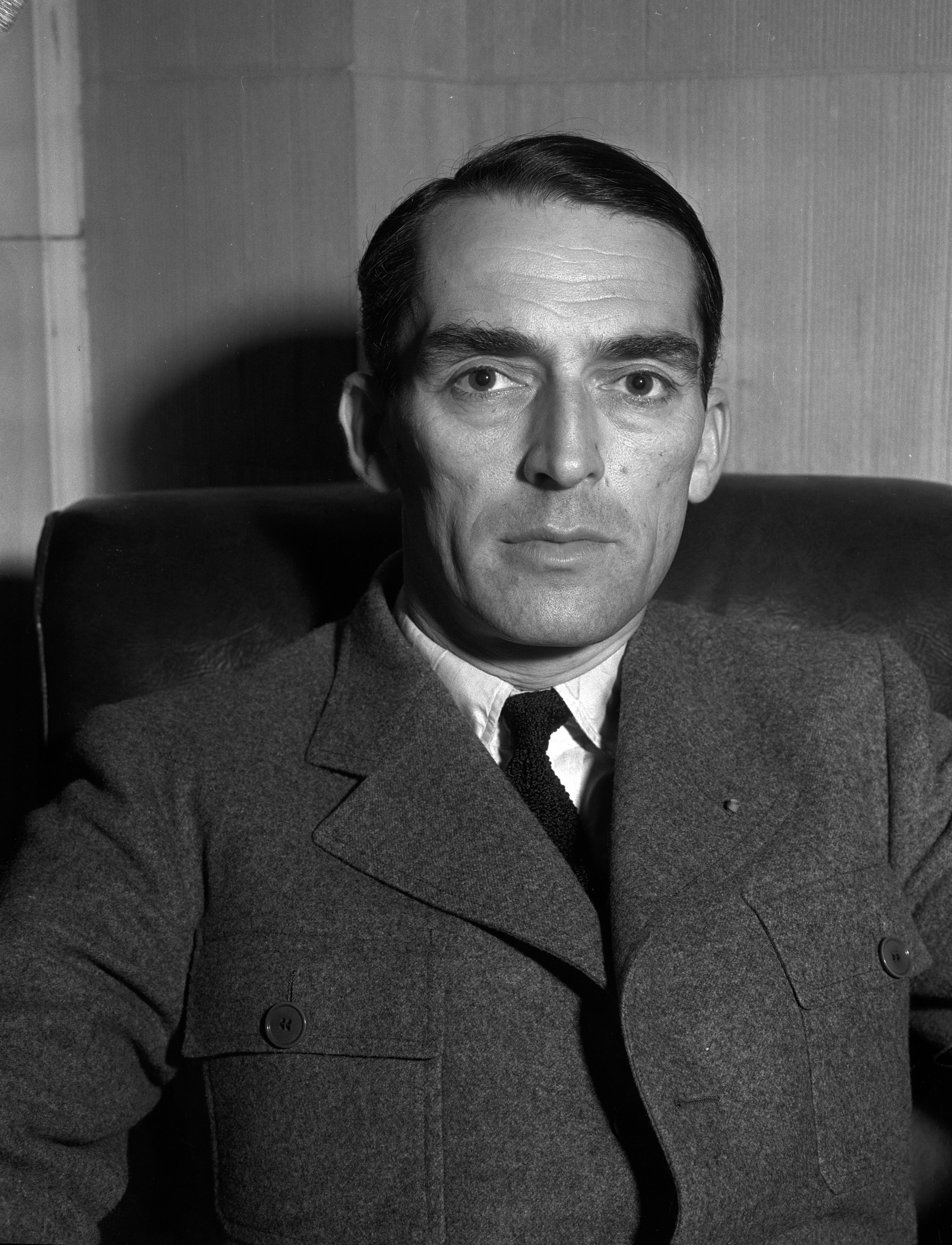
- Sondermajer, 1934
- Born: 19 February 1892; Belgrade, Kingdom of Serbia
- Died: 10 October 1967; Belgrade, SFR Yugoslavia
- Education: University of Belgrade
- Occupations: Fighter pilot; Aviation engineer
- Known for: World War I fighter pilot; Aviation pioneer; Aeroput founder
- Spouse: Milica Petrović
- Children: Stanislav, Mihailo
- Parent(s): Roman Sondermajer; Stanislava Đurić
- Relatives: Stanislav Sondermajer (brother)
- Military career
- Allegiance: Kingdom of Serbia; France; Kingdom of Yugoslavia
- Branch: Air Force
- Service years: 1912––1923 1939–1941
- Rank: Colonel (JKRV)
- Conflicts: First Balkan War; Second Balkan War; World War I
- Awards: see below

Tadija R. Sondermajer (Serbian Cyrillic: Тадија Сондермајер; 19 February 1892 – 10 October 1967) was a Serbian aviator, aeronautical engineer and a pioneer of Yugoslav aviation.

During World War I Sondermajer was the only fighter plane pilot from the Kingdom of Serbia to get selected to join Les Cigognes (The Storks), the elite French Air Force unit, fighting on the Western Front, most notably against the German squadron of the Red Baron. After the war he completed a record Paris-Bombay-Paris intercontinental flight, less than a month before Lindbergh's flight from New York to Paris. In 1927 Sondermajer founded Aeroput the first civil aviation company in the Kingdom of Yugoslavia. Between the wars he was promoted to colonel in the Royal Yugoslav Air Force Reserve.

Sondermajer received the highest Serbian, Yugoslav and French decorations for his war service and numerous peacetime decorations such as the Order of Karađorđe, the Gold Medal for Courage, and the French Legion of Honour.

== Early life ==
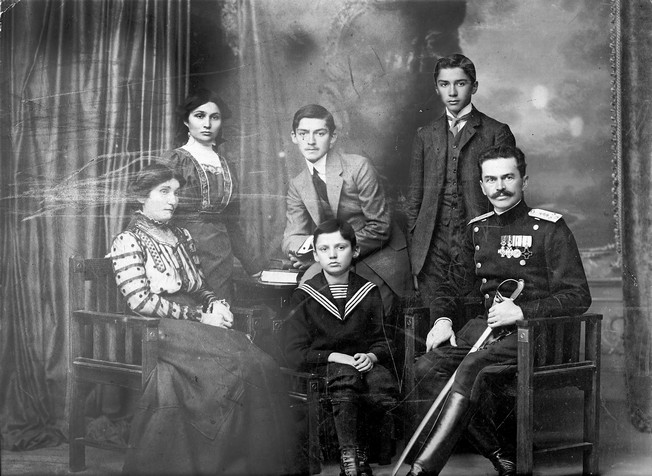
Right to left: Col Dr Roman Sondermajer, children: Vladimir, Tadija, Stanislav. Jadviga and spouse Stanislava

Tadija Sondermajer was born on 19 February 1892 in Belgrade; his father, Colonel Dr Roman Sondermajer was of German-Polish origin originally from Kraków, he was the director of the Belgrade Military Hospital and of the Serbian Military Medical Service, Roman Sondermajer is considered the founder of Serbian war surgery; Sondermajer's mother Stanislava Đurić Sondermajer was the daughter of General Dimitrije Đurić and granddaughter of Minister of Education Dimitrije Matić, she was vice president of the Circle of Serbian Sisters. Sondermajer had three siblings: Vladimir, Stanislav "Staško" and sister Jadviga. Although their father remained a Catholic, all the children were baptised Orthodox.

Sondermajer was educated at a local school before going to Gymnasium (secondary school) where he proved to be a good student; He graduated from the Second Belgrade High School in 1910. He had planned to pursue a professional career in architecture and after graduation left the country for the Faculty of Technology in Heidelberg.

== World War I ==
=== Lieutenant of Cavalry ===
In October 1912 when the First Balkan War broke out and Serbia, Montenegro, Greece, and Bulgaria raised against the Ottoman Empire, twenty years old Sondermajer left his studies in Germany and immediately rushed back home enlisting in the Serbian cavalry as a volunteer. After participating in the second Balkan Wars against Bulgaria in 1913, he was awarded the Silver medal for courage and promoted to Second Lieutenant of Cavalry.

In the Summer of 1914, Austro-Hungarian troops invaded the Kingdom of Serbia, Sondermajer joined the 4th Cavalry Regiment under Lieutenant Colonel Petar Zivkovič, despite heavy loss on both sides, the Serbian army managed to repulse three successive Austro-Hungarian attempted invasions of the country; When Belgrade was liberated after twelve days of occupation on 15 December 1914, Sondermajer led a cavalry patrol that first entered the city escorting King Peter to church. In 1915 Sondermajer is promoted Lieutenant and decorated with the gold medal for courage.

After two humiliating defeats suffered by Austro-Hungarian troops, Germany took over command of the campaign against Serbia. On 7 October 1915, German forces attacked from the north towards the Morava river, Austro-Hungarian attacked across the Drina from the west and Bulgaria, who had secretly joined the Central Powers, entered the Vardar valley from the east, cutting off a vital southward route of retreat for Serbian troops. The Serbian government and armed forces still refused to surrender. The Sondermajer brothers crossed the snowy Albanian mountains in the arduous winter retreat with the rest of the Serbian army and a substantial number of civilians; they settled on the Greek island of Corfu in early 1916.

On Corfu, Tadija and Vladimir entered the air force as an observer on scouting missions over the Eastern Front, completing after several months course a reconnaissance course in Salonika on 22 June 1916. Sondermajer is then assigned to MF 82 squadron based at the airfield base of Vertekop on 6 August 1916 to support the Allied offensive. Reconnaissance scouts were used to undertaking long-range reconnaissance operations to track enemy troop movements; tactical support via observation was enhanced by the development of the clock code system of directing artillery fire, which mapped and corrected the fall of shot.

=== Fighter pilot ===
During the summer of 1917 Sondermajer entered and completed pilot training at the 403th Aviation Park and Training Centre of Sedes Air Base near Salonika. On one occasion he succeeded in forcing a superior enemy aircraft to escape, for which he received praise from Field Marshal Stepa Stepanović. In November 1917, Sondermajer, ill from malaria, is sent to hospital in France.

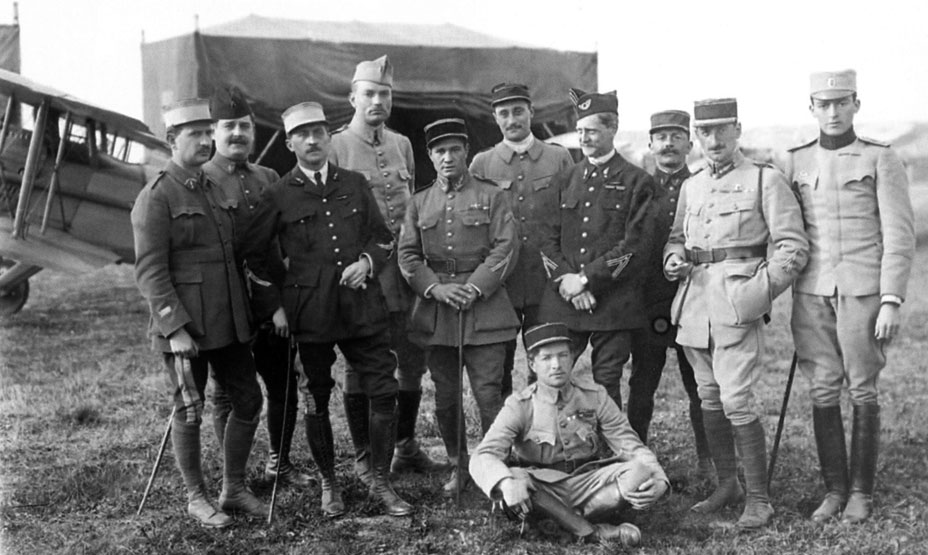
Tadija Sondermajer (first from right) with other officers of Groupe de Combat 12. René Fonck is seated on the ground.

Instead of the planned three months, Sondermajer spent only one in the hospital and joined the advanced flying school in Pau to learn acrobatics and aviation-sharpshooting, his brother Vladimir joined him a few months later. Sondermajer finished best in class following with training at the Aerial Gunnery School in Cazaux before being recruited to join a French fighting squadron on the western front while his brother headed back to the Salonika front.

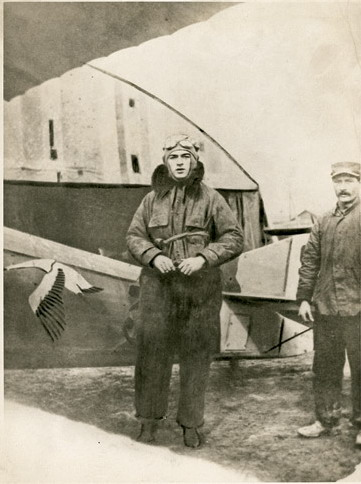
Lieutenant Sondermajer in front of his SPAD S.XIII C-1 with GC12 famous stork insignia

On 1 March 1918, Sondermajer is transferred to the French elite fighter squadron (GC 12) 'Les Cigognes' ('The Storks') the best fighter plane group in France, it was commanded by celebrated French ace Georges Guynemer, and after Guynemer's death, by an even greater ace – the legendary Rene Fonck; as one of the 60 top fighter pilots, Sondermajer was selected to join the group in charge of the hardest combat missions on the Western front during the battle of the Marne. From April 15 to May 21, his group had for enemy the "Flying Circus" composed up of Fokker fighters led by the famous German flying ace Manfred von Richthofen, better known as the Red Baron. During one mission above the enemy line, as he was returning to the base with an empty machine gun, Sondermajer was attacked by three German fighters. He saved himself by performing flying acrobatics, which made the enemy failed to shot down him. On his return from a second fight on May 21 his SPAD XIII caught fire after being shot, miraculously he was able to land in Flanders, Sondermajer survived the crash of his plane but was severely burned with a leg injury. After treatment and demobilisation, Sondermajer enrolled at the School of Aeronautics and Mechanical Construction in Paris (École supérieure d'aéronautique et de constructions mécaniques) where he received a degree in airplane engineering in 1921. In 1923 he left active service to become a reserve officer. (Note: Official Gazette March 29, 1919 & November 2 and 10, 1921.)

For his service France made him an Officer of the Legion of Honour and awarded him the Croix de Guerre (War Cross); at his return to Serbia Alexander I of Yugoslavia awarded him, Serbia's highest decoration, the Order of Karađorđe's Star and both Gold and Silver Medal for Bravery.

== Inter-war period ==
=== Aero Club ===
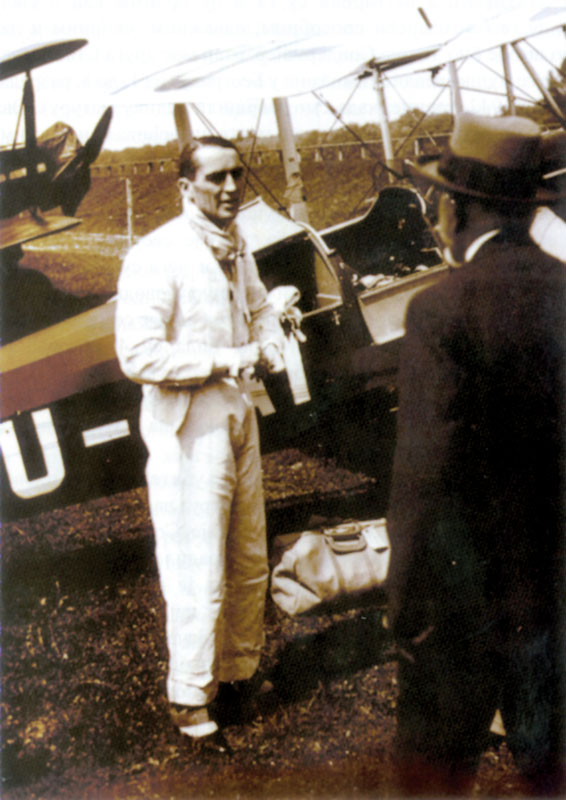
Tadija Sondermajer next to DH.60 Gipsy Moth c. 1932.

As the first Yugoslavian aviation engineer, Sondermajer started immediately getting involved in the development of military, civilian and sports aviation. An Army Aviation Department was formed with Serbian personnel but also ex-Austro-Hungarian (Croatian and Slovenian). Sondermajer is asked to launch a major initiative to replace World War I era aircraft still in service with more modern ones.

In May 1922 along with demobilised Serbian aviators and veterans from the Salonika front, Sondermajer decided to form an Aero Club, the first non-profit flying sports club in the country. At the club's first regular assembly session (on 14 May 1922), the Aero Club was renamed the Aero Club of the Kingdom of Serbs, Croats, and Slovenes. Sondermajer was elected as the club's vice-president, and Prince Pavle became president.

==== Crnjanski duel ====
At a meeting of the Aero Club, in June 1926, Sondermajer and other members got into an argument with Miloš Crnjanski about the type of planes that the national airline should purchase. General Dušan Simović suggested that the planes were purchased from France since the principle agreement was to take planes from allies, but Crnjanski claimed that German planes were significantly better In order to bring the dispute to a conclusion Crnjanski slapped the officers in attendance across their faces with white gloves challenging them to a duel. Sondermajer was the only one who accepted the chance to defend his honour. The duel was scheduled to take place on 26 September 1926 in the vicinity of Vršac where, according to the old laws of Austria-Hungary, the duel was still considered a knightly act. The battle was fought gentlemanly, with minutes taken and in the presence of seconds (Note: Seconds were close friends chosen by the aggrieved parties to conduct their honour dispute.) (Crnjanski was represented by theatre director Branko Gavela and writer Dušan Matić), with trophy weapons borrowed especially for the occasion from the Dunđerski family. The first shot was fired by Crnjanski and missed the target. According to the recorded minutes, Sondermajer aimed at Crnjanski for a short time, then lowered his gun and said in French: "I give up, you are forgiven". At Crnjaski's passionate insistence that the duel continues, Sondermajer shot into the air and departed.

The construction of a new airport began in 1923. The growing interest of some German companies to fly through Belgrade prompted members of the Aero Club to ask the government to protect the domestic interest and to set up their own company to deal with civilian traffic. At a conference in Belgrade on 6 February 1926, a joint-stock company for air traffic was founded. The company pledged to launch the Belgrade-Zagreb line while the state promised to cover three-quarters of the cost per kilometre of flight in cash and in kind. However, the subscription of shares was below all expectations, so that by March 1927, only 10 percent of the required six million dinars that the state had initially prescribed was collected, this threatened to shut down the company, from the beginning, according to a law on joint-stock companies at that time.

==== Paris - Bombay - Belgrade ====
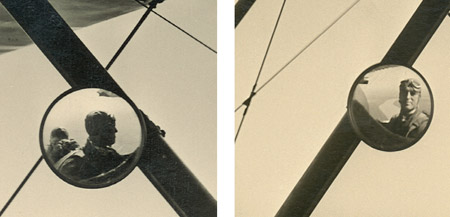
Sondermajer photographing himself as well as Leonid Bajdak, in the airplane's rearview mirror in the course of the flight to Bombay

Sondermajer proposed to conduct a promotional stage flight with Paris-Bombay-Belgrade with pilot Leonid Bajdak to show the value and capability of Serbian pilots and the safety of air travel helping to spark the public's interest in flight and hopefully bring new shareholders that could save the company from bankruptcy.

Sondermajer and Russian born Leonid Bajdak chose to fly Paris to Bombay to Belgrade aboard a French biplane Potez XXV aircraft with a Lorraine-450rich Dietrich engine, nobody had ever flown such a route before, flying over endless uninhabited ranges of the Middle East and southwest Asia.

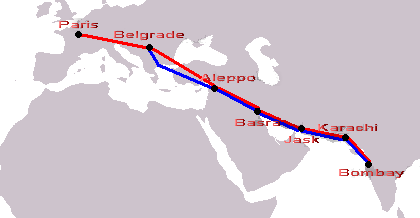
Transcontinental flight with Potez 25, in 1927: Paris - Belgrade - Aleppo - Basra - Jask - Karachi - Bombay.

Sondermajer and Badjak set off leaving Paris on 20 April 1927. The strong winds and desert storms steered them off their course several times, the flight was performed in 15 stages over 11 days, with a route of 14,800 km (9,191-mile) flying over 89 hours of effective flight (daily average of 1,346 km with an average hourly speed of 166 km), the route and climatic conditions in which the flight was performed were very challenging

Bajdak and Sondermajer landed back in Belgrade's Bezanija airport having completed Paris-Belgrade-Aleppo-Basra-Jask-Karachi-Bombay-Karachi-Jask-Basra-Aleppo-Belgrade. They were greeted by a crowd of 30 000 people.

=== Aeroput ===
Aeroput was established on 17 June 1927, after the historic flight, Sondermajer became famous rescuing Aeroput from bankruptcy; Aeroput shares grew to exceed all expectations. As many as 412 shareholders gathered the required capital of six million dinars, and Aeroput purchased four aircraft.

Aeroput's first planes arrived in early February 1928. Aeroput's management bought four "Potez 29/2" type biplanes from a French company. Aeroput's management opted for this type of aircraft because of the local Ikarbus factory in Zemun, under license from the same French company that produced the Potez 25 planes for the Air Force.

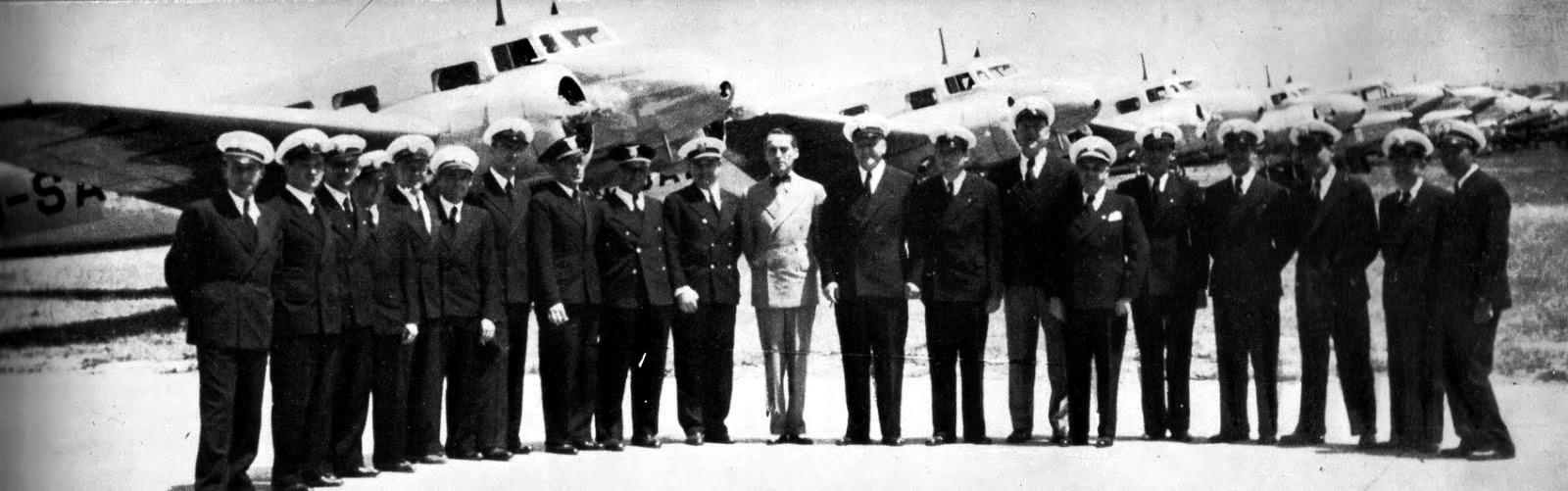
Tadija Sondermajer surrounded by Aeroput's pilots in 1938. The Aeroput fleet in the background is composed of most Lockheed Model 10 Electra and Caudron C.449 Goéland

The first promotional flight was conducted between Belgrade and Zagreb on 15 February 1928. The Potez 29/2 type aircraft, under the name "Beograd", took to the sky at 9 am, under the command of company director Sondermajer and Vladimir Striževski. The first passengers were journalists. On 5 May 1930 Sondermajer along Vladimir Striževski, chief pilot of the Company, landed the first passenger plane in Podgorica, Montenegro, on an old airfield near Vrela Ribničkih, the aircraft was a Potez 29-2 biplane with nine seats with the name "Skopje". In addition to mechanic Pavle Ćuk they were transporting five journalists, including the correspondent of Politika Nikolić and cinematographer Njemec; to accommodate equipment, food supplies, water, clothes, blankets, and other supplies, some seats in the passenger cabin had been dismantled.

The flight route they were following was Belgrade-Skopje-Podgorica-Mostar-Sarajevo-Belgrade. Aeroput became a successful airline company that connected the Kingdom of Yugoslavia with the rest of the world.

Sondermajer received the National Order of Merit for the development of Yugoslav aviation, soon after Sondermajer was elected vice president of the Fédération Aéronautique Internationale (FAI) a position he kept from 1935 to 1946.

== World War II ==
In March 1941, the Air Force took over the civilian aviation fleet, a Transport Group was formed, comprising all nine Aeroput planes as well as one government aircraft. Sondermajer, as reserve lieutenant colonel in the Yugoslav Air Force, was appointed the commander of the newly created group (part of JKRV) with the mission of establishing an air bridge between Yugoslavia and Greece in case of conflict. Sondermajer's brother, Lt Col Vladislav Sondermajer, was appointed the commander of the Rajlovac Air Force Regiment near Sarajevo.

The terror bombing of Belgrade, code-named "Operation Punishment", started on the Sunday morning of 6 April 1941 when the Dojno Polje Airport and its Air Base were bombed by German planes. During that day Belgrade suffered attack by 484 German bombers and Stukas, which dropped 360 tons of bombs. The Luftwaffe dropped all categories of bombs from small incendiaries to 1000 kg landmines. 47% of the buildings of the city were hit left totally destroyed or damaged. The JKRV flew 474 sorties but not a fighter remained available to counter the Luftwaffe. Sondermajer managed to organise for one last plane to transfer the Yugoslav government to Thessaloniki and Alexandria The bombing of Belgrade went on for three days.

Wehrmacht forces, backed by Italian, Romanian, Hungarian and Bulgarian allies, invaded Yugoslavia, on 22 April 1941, Serbia was placed under the authority of the German Military Administration. Sondermajer and his two sons were apprehended by the Gestapo and sent to jail. The Germans authorities suspecting them of being Jewish however after finding out that Sondermajer's grandfather had been the Catholic bishop of Kraków they were let free. Sondermajer's release was suspicious to the refugee government in London and they deprived him of his rank for alleged cooperation with the Germans; Later, after investigation via local agents, they returned his rank to him, this was broadcast via Radio London with an apology.

Upon their release, Sondermajer's sons, 17-year-old Stanislav and 13-year-old Mihailo, made their way to Ravna Gora, the highland of central Serbia, and joined the Chetnik resistance, under the leadership of Colonel Draža Mihailović, who was fighting the German occupation. In June 1944 they were part of a group that rescued two US airmen, 1st Lt Frederick H Barrett and 2nd Lt Donald H Parkerson of the 772nd Bomb Squadron,^{c} managing to sneak them out of the country safely during Operation Halyard where a total of 417 Americans were rescued. Barrett and Parkerson were evacuated on August 10, they were the first Halyard evacuation. Sondermajer took part in the fight to liberate Belgrade on 15 October 1944 when he volunteered as a pilot.

== Later life ==
When the new communist authorities accessed to power, post-war Yugoslavia became a Stalinist police state, members of the bourgeoisie, the aristocracy and pre-war members of the elite were imprisoned and sentenced to death or to hard labour; the authorities did not forgive Sondermajer's closeness with the Royal Court. On 25 October 1944 he was arrested and sentenced to death along with his two sons. The eldest, Stanislav, spent a year in detention (at Obilićev Venac, the prison of the Special Police during the German occupation), while the younger, Mihailo spent about half a year behind bars.

His wife Milica started campaigning for their release, pre-war friends, who were close to the Communists, and who came to power after the war, could not or did not want to help, (Note: Head of State Ivan Ribar was a pre-war shareholder and a board member of Aeroput.) after a year she managed to speak to Aleksandar Ranković who promised that Sondermajer would not be executed. The following year Sondermajer was rehabilitated and had his civil liberties and rights restored to him on the basis of a new Amnesty Law. In June 1947 he began working part-time for the construction enterprise Polet, Sondermajer lost property, income and friends and was never again allowed to fly or have any contact with aviation. He died on 10 October 1967.

== Family and relatives ==
Sondermajer married Milica Petrović, daughter of Brigadier General Dr. Mihailo Petrović, professor at the Faculty of Medicine and president of the Serbian Medical Association. Dr Petrović was head of the Surgery Department within the framework of Belgrade Military Hospital from 1921 to 1941 just like Sondermajer had been from 1889 to 1910. The Sondermajer's first son Stanislav was born in 1924, their second Mihailo was born in 1928, both sons joined the resistance fighting the German occupants during the war.

Sondermajer's brother Vladislav was captured by the Nazis and sent to a prison camp in Germany, he never went back to his country, he died in York in 1949. Through his mother, Sondermajer was related to the Naumović, Čolak-Antić and Ristić families.

== Legacy ==
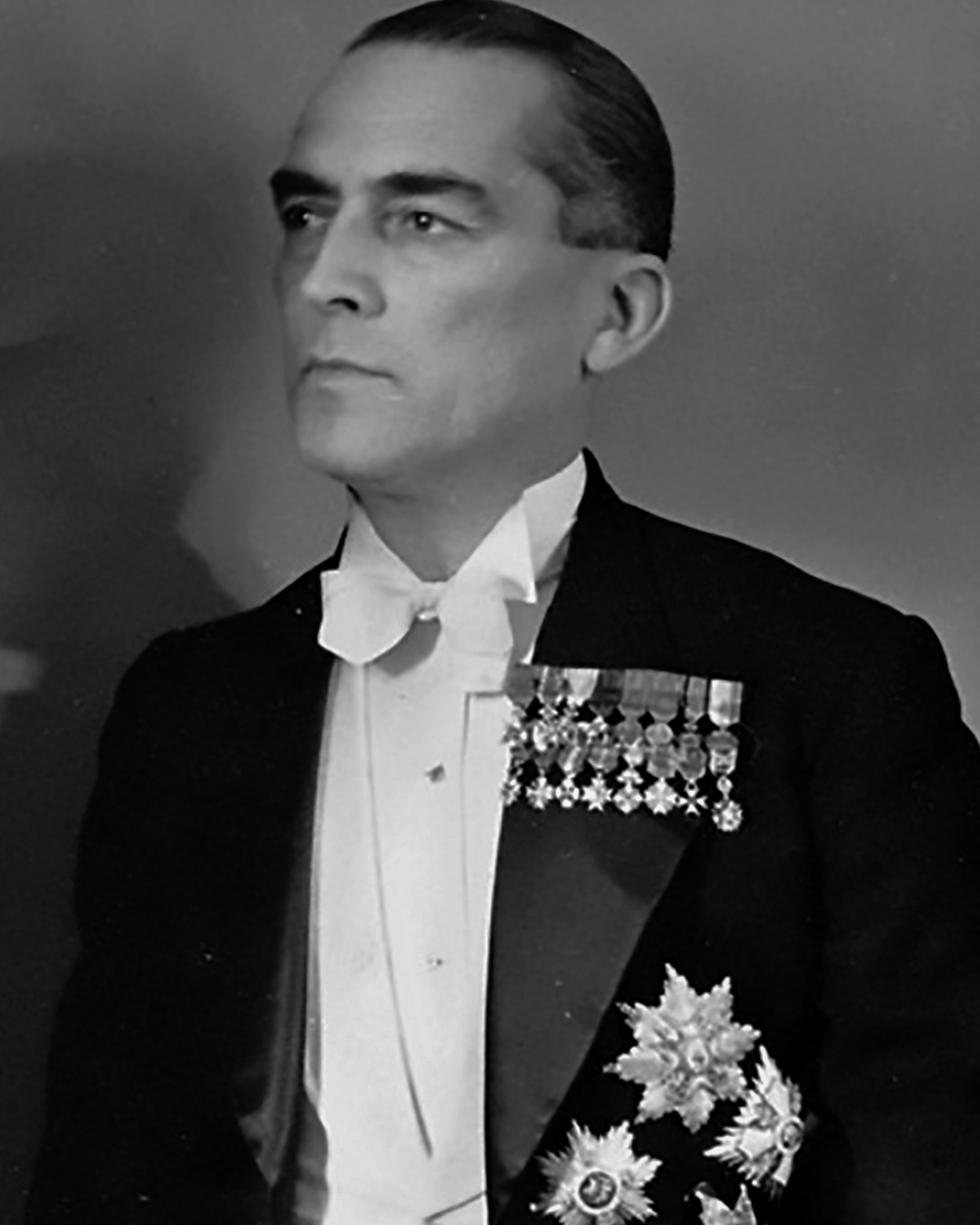
Tadija Sondermajer wearing his decorations c.1940

In April 1967, on Aeroput's 40th anniversary and on the 20th anniversary of Yugoslav Airlines, the national company's management rewarded Sondermajer, the first director of Aeroput, with a monetary award as a token of esteem and gratitude for his services in developing Serbian and Yugoslav civil aviation. This was the first and only official recognition Sondermajer received after World War II; a delegation from Yugoslav Airlines - JAT and the Aviation Museum gave Sondermajer a bouquet of 40 roses and a sum amounting to several wages. He died in Belgrade several months later, on October 10, 1967.

On the 80th anniversary of Aeroput in 2007, Jat Airways launched an initiative to name a Belgrade street after him, the plan went through and on 1 November 2017, he was given a street in New Belgrade, in the place of the old airport. According to Serbian newspaper Novosti, a commemorative stamp was issued in 2011.

On 17 June 2017, on the occasion of the 90th anniversary of the founding of Aeroput, a bust of Sondermajer was unveiled in the city park, on the corners of Palmotićeva and Koste Stojanovića streets in Belgrade, by the representatives of the institutions which supported the project realization: the deputy mayor of Belgrade Andreja Mladenović, the manager of the Directorate of the Civil Aviation Mirjana Čizmarov and the director of Air Serbia Dane Kondić.

In June 2017 a commemorative plaque dedicated to Sondermajer and Dr Archibald Reiss was installed at the entrance of the Aero Club building, 4 Uzun Mirkova Street in Belgrade, it was arranged by the Airline Pilots Association of Serbia and the National Aeroclub of Serbia "Our Wings".

An exhibition called "Sondermajer - born Polish, but with a Serbian heart" took place at the Jadar Museum in Loznica in December 2017.

== Military honors and decorations ==
Sondermajer was decorated with the highest Serbian, Yugoslav and French decorations:

Ribbon	Name	Country
	Order of Karađorđe's Star	Serbia
	Order of St. Sava	Serbia
	Gold Medal for Bravery	Serbia
	Silver Medal for Bravery	Serbia
	First Balkan War	Serbia
	Second Balkan War	Serbia
	Albanian Commemorative Medal	Serbia
	Légion d'honneur (Officier)	France
	Croix de guerre	France
