= Draga Dejanović =

Serbian poet (1840–1871)

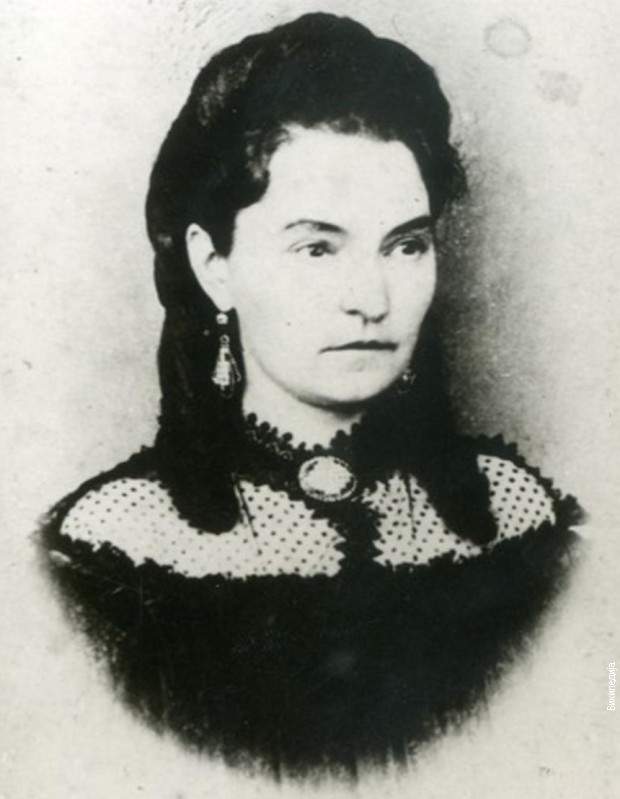
Photo of Serbian teacher, poet and early feminist Draga Dimitrijević Dejanović

Draga Dejanović (Kanjiža, 18 August 1840 – Bečej, 26 June 1871) was an ethnic Serbian poet who lived in Austria-Hungary. Besides Milica Stojadinović-Srpkinja, she is considered one of the first Serbian feminists of the modern era. She has been called "the first Serbian suffragette" by the literary critic Jovan Skerlić in his assessment of her place in Serbian culture.

== Biography ==
Draga Dimitrijević was born on 18 August 1840 at Stara Kanjiza in the Austrian Empire (now in Serbia). Her parents were Zivojin and Sofija Dimitrijević. Her father was a well-to-do lawyer who sent Draga to a Serbian grammar school in her native town and, later, to the Vincikov Institute in Timișoara (today in Romania). Due to her poor eyesight, her education was interrupted. Together with her family, she moved from Stara Kanjiza to Bečej, where she met and married a young schoolmaster Mihailo Dejanović against her father's wishes. Soon afterward, she resumed her education in Pest (Hungary), where she met a group of Serbian students, members of United Serb Youth, which included Laza Kostić, Giga Geršić, and Jovan Turoma. In Hungary, she began writing poems and called for the United Serb Youth to stand openly behind the demand for equal education for both girls and boys. Her poems and lectures were first published in a magazine called Danica (Morningstar) and later collected and published as a book under the title Spisi Drage Dejanović (Writings of Draga Dejanović, 1869).

In the 1860s, Dejanović joined the recently established Serbian National Theater of Novi Sad. It was a bold break with established rules and disapproved by her family. One year later, Draga moved to Belgrade where she translated some plays for the National Theater of Serbia. In 1864, Dejanović returned to Bečaj, where she continued to live with her husband. Despite her obligations, she did not abandon public work and the task she had devoted herself to "prospećivanije Srpstva" (the enlightenment of Serbdom), an expression she often used in her texts. She wrote three important studies: Nekoliko reći srpskim ženama (A couple of suggestions to Serbian women); Emancipacija Srpkinje (The Emancipation of Serbian women); and Srpskoj majci (To the attention of the Serbian Mother), in which she expressed her dissatisfaction with the inert behavior of Serbian women. Dejanović's son died in infancy in 1867. She herself died in 1871 while giving birth to a daughter.

Some of Dejanović's writings remained unpublished. The most important of these included her play Deoba Jakšića (The Succession of Jakšić), Svećenik u moralku (The Priest in Venice) and a pedagogical study, Mati (Mother). Perhaps her most well-known works were her feminist writings. She saw the enlightenment of women as necessary for the awakening of the people's self-consciousness and sought to contribute to this awakening.

== See also ==
- Ana Marija Marović
- Princess Anka Obrenović
- Milica Stojadinović-Srpkinja
- Staka Skenderova
- Eustahija Arsić
