= Milenko Vesnić =

Serbian diplomat, cabinet member and prime minister

Milenko R. Vesnić
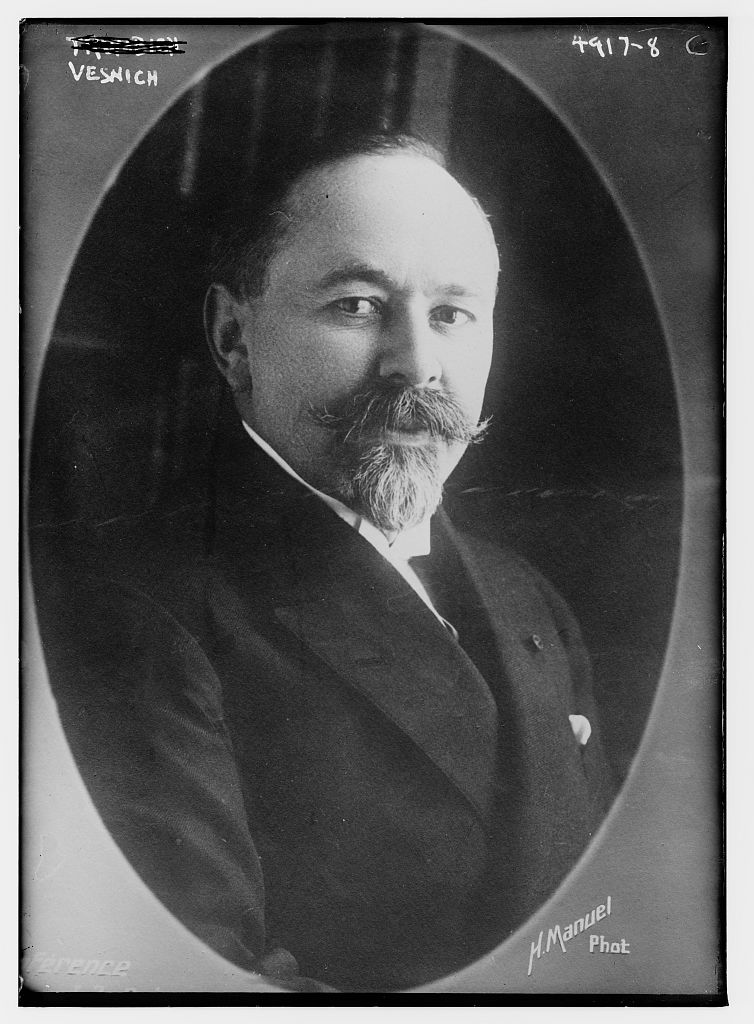

3rd Prime Minister of Yugoslavia
- In office 16 May 1920 – 1 January 1921
- Monarch: Peter I
- Preceded by: Stojan Protić
- Succeeded by: Nikola Pašić

2nd Minister of Foreign Affairs
- In office 22 November 1920 – 1 January 1921
- Preceded by: Ante Trumbić
- Succeeded by: Nikola Pašić

Personal details
- Born: 13 February 1863 Dunišiće, Principality of Serbia
- Died: 15 May 1921 (aged 58) Paris, France
- Party: People's Radical Party
- Spouse: Blanche Ulman

Milenko Radomar Vesnić (Vesnitch in French, and Wesnitsch in German; 13 February 1863 – 15 May 1921) was a Serbian politician, diplomat, cabinet member and prime minister.

== Early life ==
Vesnić studied law at the Velika škola in Belgrade and at the Ludwig-Maximilians-Universität München from 1883. On 8 August 1888, Vesnić received a Ph.D. in law with a thesis under the title "The Blood Feud among South Slavs". His highly praised thesis was published in German the following year in Stuttgart. Over the next two years, from 1888 to 1889 in Paris and from 1889 to 1890 in London, he obtained further specialization in law.

== Career ==
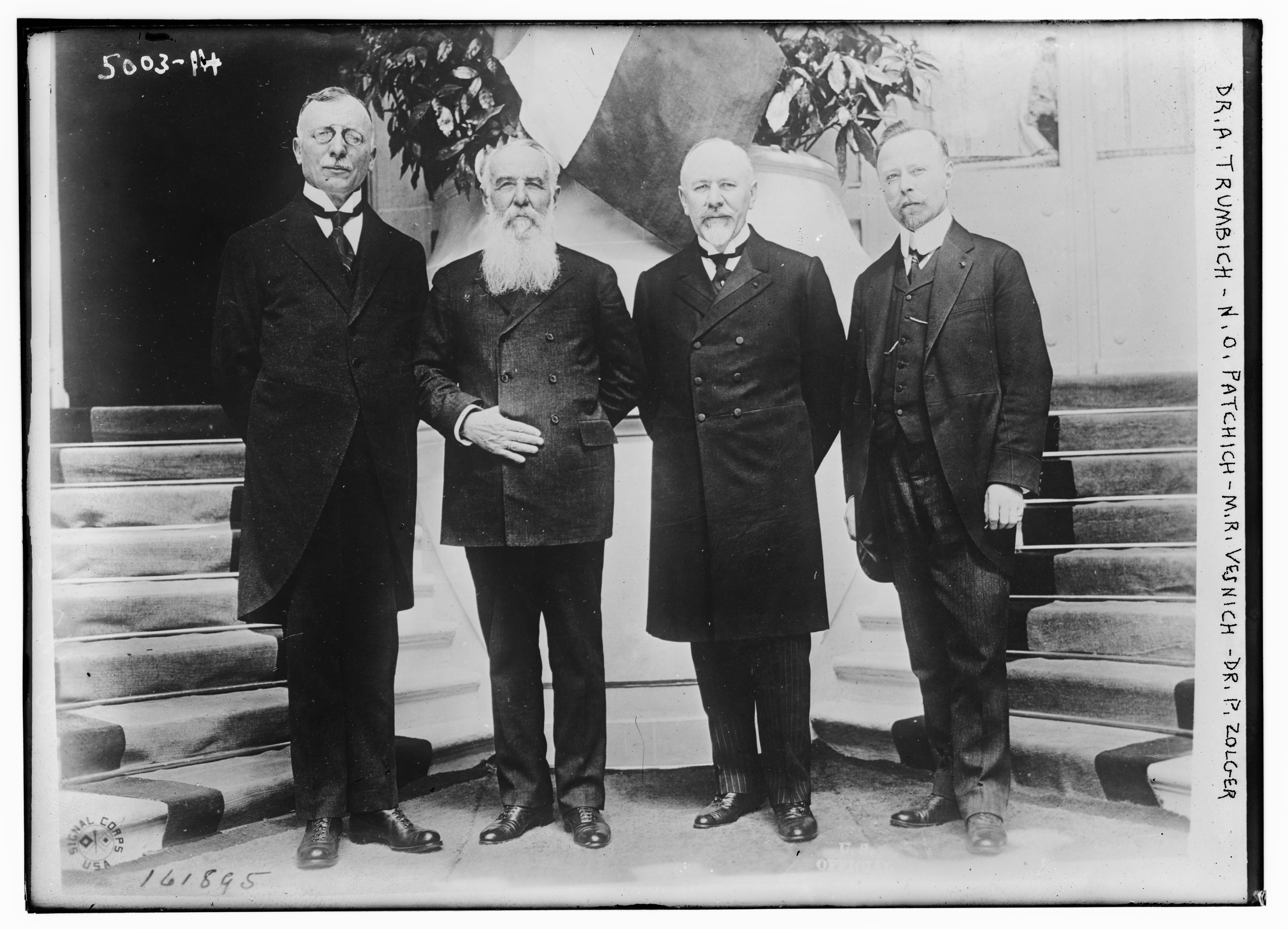
Croatian politician Ante Trumbić and Serbian leaders Nikola Pašić and Vesnic and Slovene diplomat Ivan Žolger at the Paris Peace Conference, 1919.

Vesnić joined the diplomatic service of Serbia in 1891, as the secretary of the Serbian Legation at Constantinople. In 1893, he was appointed a university professor teaching international law at Velika škola in Belgrade, and the same year became MP in the National Assembly of Serbia as a member of the People's Radical Party.

In the government of Sava Grujić from 1893 to 1894), he was the Minister of Education and Religious Affairs. In 1899, he was sentenced to two years in prison after he insulted King Milan I. In 1901, Vesnić returned to the diplomatic service as the Serbian Minister in Rome.

In 1904, Vesnić was appointed Serbian Minister in Paris, a posting he held for almost 17 years in various terms. In the Radical cabinet of Nikola Pašić in 1906, Vesnić was Minister of Justice, and afterward returned to Paris, again as the Serbian Minister to France. After the Balkan Wars, Vesnić was a member of the Serbian delegation at the Conference of Ambassadors in London from 1912 to 1913.

During the First World War, Vesnić successfully organized various conferences in favour of the war effort of Serbia.

Vesnić was the diplomatic representative from Serbia at the Paris Peace Conference at Versailles in June 1919. Vesnić travelled to Washington prior to the Peace Conference to meet with Wilson and explain the Serbian position with respect to the break-up of the Austro-Hungarian Empire. He also represented Serbia at the League of Nations Conference in January 1919.

In 1920 Vesnić became Prime Minister of the Kingdom of Serbs, Croats and Slovenes, and during his office, he signed the Rapallo Treaty with Italy. During his second government (1920–1921), Vesnić retained the portfolio of Foreign Minister as well.

=== Scholarly works ===
A collection of his speeches and articles in French papers and journals was published in Paris in 1921 under the title: "Serbia through the Great War ("La Serbie à travers la Grande Guerre").

Vesnić was elected a corresponding member of the Académie des Sciences Morales et Politiques in Paris.

A talented scholar Vesnić wrote dozens of studies regarding international law in general and the position of Bosnia-Herzegovina in the international system after the Austro-Hungarian occupation in 1878, in particular.

Vesnić translated important university textbooks on international and criminal law from French and German into the Serbian language, as well as the book on Prince Miloš Obrenović rule, written in French by his Italian physician Bartholomeo Cunibert.

== Personal life ==
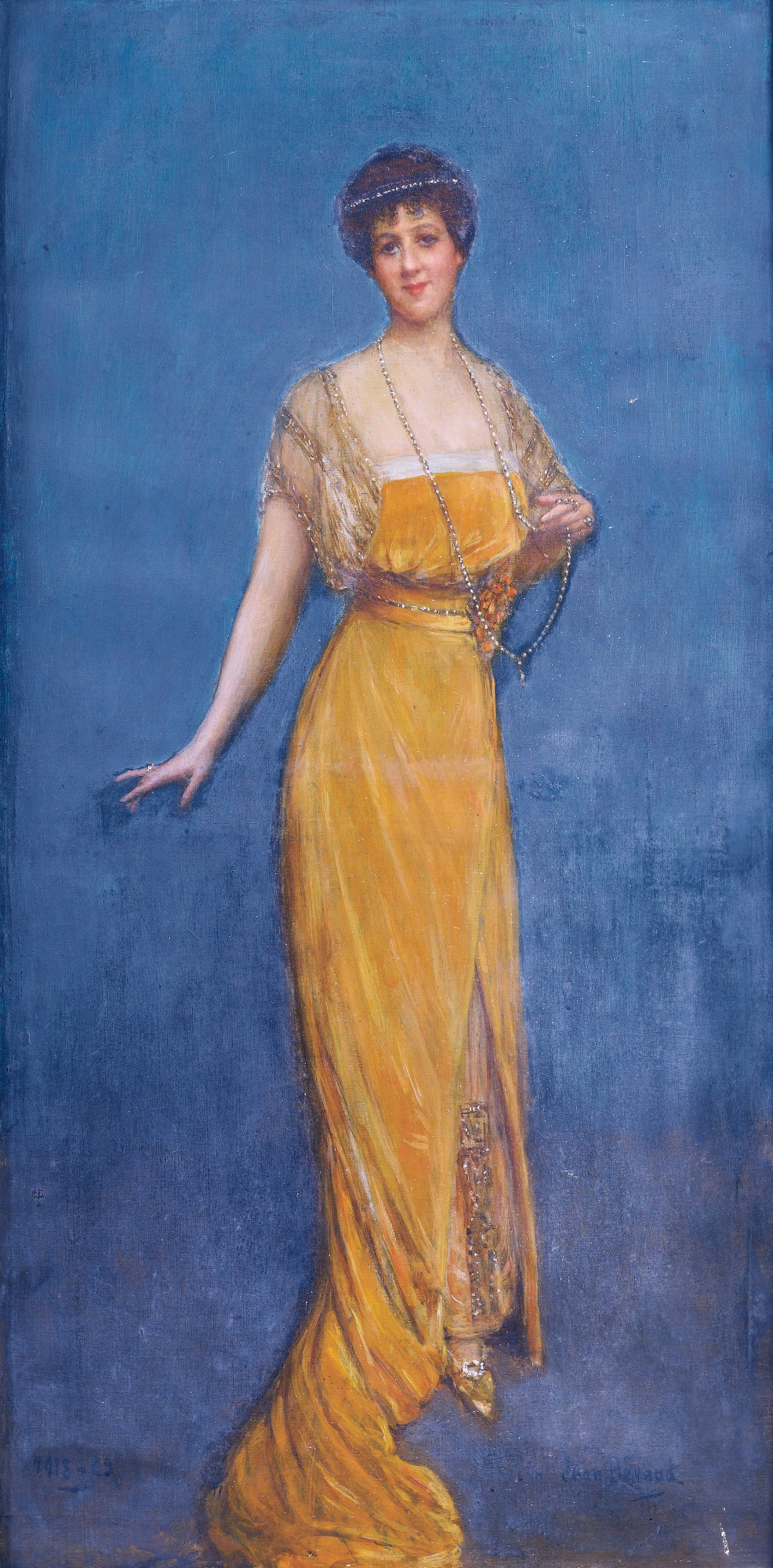
Portrait of his wife, Blanche, by Jean Béraud, 1913

In 1906, he was married to the American Blanche (née Ulman) Wertheim (1870–1951) who was acquainted with President Wilson's wife. The former wife of Siegfried Salomon Wertheim, her sister, Cécile Ulman, married Napoléon Louis de Talleyrand-Périgord, 8th Duke of Montmorency, as her second husband. From her first marriage, Blanche was the mother of Vota Lucille Joan Wertheim, who took her stepfather's surname and married Aristide Blank.

Vesnić died in Paris on 15 May 1921. She died at the Ritz Carlton, Paris in 1951.

== Selected works ==
- Milenko R. Wesnitsch, Die Blutrache bei den Südslaven: ein Beitrag zur Geschichte des Strafrechts, Stuttgart: Gebrüder Kröner, 1889.(PhD thesis in German language).
- Milenko R. Vesnitch, La Serbie à travers la Grande Guerre, Bossard, Paris 1921.

== See also ==
- Gliša Geršić
- Dragutin Pećić

== Sources ==
- Pavlowitch, Stevan K. (2002). Serbia: The History behind the Name. London: Hurst & Company. ISBN 9781850654773.

Political offices
Preceded by Lazar Dokić	Minister of Education of Serbia; 1893–1894	Succeeded by Andra Đorđević
Preceded by Stojan Protić	Prime Minister of the Kingdom of Serbs, Croats and Slovenes; 1920–1921	Succeeded by Nikola Pašić
Preceded by Ante Trumbić	Minister of Foreign Affairs; 1920–1921	Succeeded by Nikola Pašić
Preceded by Dragutin Pećić	Minister of Justice of Serbia; 1906–1907	Succeeded by Marko Trifković
