= Main Board for Serb Liberation =

- Formation: December 1871–January 1872
- Type: secret revolutionary organization
- Purpose: Liberation and unification of Serb-inhabited territories in the Ottoman Empire to the Principality of Serbia.
- Location: Kragujevac
- Key people: Jevrem Marković

The Main Board for Serb Liberation (Serbian: Главни одбор за српско ослобођење/Glavni odbor za srpsko oslobođenje) was a Serb revolutionary organization, a secret society, founded in 1871, based in Kragujevac, Principality of Serbia. It sought the liberation and unification of Serb-inhabited territory in the Ottoman Empire.

== History ==
In 1871, the Association for Serb Liberation and Unification was founded by members of the United Serbian Youth and other patriots from all over the Yugoslav lands. The "Association" established boards in Cetinje, Novi Sad, and Belgrade. Parallelly, the "Main Board" (Glavni odbor) existed in Kragujevac. This organization was founded in 1871, and was active from the beginning of 1872. It was specially established for Šumadija to work on plans for an uprising. Kragujevac was the most sophisticated of the provincial Serbian cities, and had an intelligentsia second only to Belgrade. The city was also a center of opposition, and in the early 1870s a group of oppositionists gathered around socialist Jevrem Marković. Among notable members of the Main Board for Serb Liberation were artillerist Sava Grujić, artillerist Pavle Šafarik, officer Radomir Putnik, merchant Jaša Marković, Jevrem Marković (the main initiator), and others.

Milivoje Blaznavac, the leader of the Serbian Regency, a legitimist and political conservatist, decidedly refused proposals and plans of the United Serbian Youth, regarding the organization's project unrealistic and impracticable; that Turkey (the Ottoman Empire) was still strong and that Russia was against an uprising in the Balkans, and that the organization also had subversive intent against the regency. Blaznavac and Jovan Ristić were alarmed by the establishment of the revolutionary organizations in Cetinje and Belgrade. The statute of the Main Board for Serb Liberation was made in the second half of December 1871, likely after the meeting between Jevrem Marković and Blaznavac. The members of the Main Board were chosen in January 1872.

In the beginning of 1872, Ljubomir Durković wrote Štatut ("the Statute"), in which it is explained that "the Main Board for Serb Liberation was established by Serb patriots with the intention to through organized uprising destroy the Turkish lordship over the Serb lands ...". The second article states that this is possible to accomplish "only when Serbia enters in the absent war" and that therefore "the uprising will inflame under the flag of Milan Obrenović IV". This is a reflection of Blaznavac's demands that he managed to impose through groups of active officers on which he had considerable influence. Further, resources for realization of the program and organizational structure of the society is specified. In January 1872, the organization sent a letter to officer Jevrem Velimirović.

In 1872, Jevrem Marković with the help of local representatives part of secret local boards of the Main Board established boards in Niš and Leskovac. A local board was established in Pirot the same year as well. In April 1872 the Central Board of the organization began its project of military use for an uprising. Jevrem Marković was planned to be appointed main commander of the rebel bands in Bosnia and Herzegovina. In 1872 a revolutionary assembly was held in Novi Sad under the leadership of Svetozar Marković, the younger brother of Jevrem Marković.

The organization sought to contact like-minded radicals in Romania and Greece. Their initiatives, however, did not work out. When Jovan Ristić fell out in early November 1873, new Interior Minister Aćim Čumić permitted for more freedom of press, leading the group of Liberals and leftists in Kragujevac that had earlier founded a cooperative printing venture (the Kragujevac Social Press established in March 1873) to start a Radical newspaper (Javnost). Among the founders were Grujić and Šafarik.

== Members ==
- Jevrem Marković
- Sava Grujić, artillerist
- Pavle Šafarik, artillerist
- Radomir Putnik, officer
- Jevrem Velimirović, officer
- Jaša Marković, merchant
- Ljubomir Durković

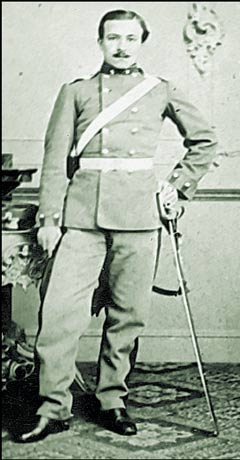
Jevrem Marković

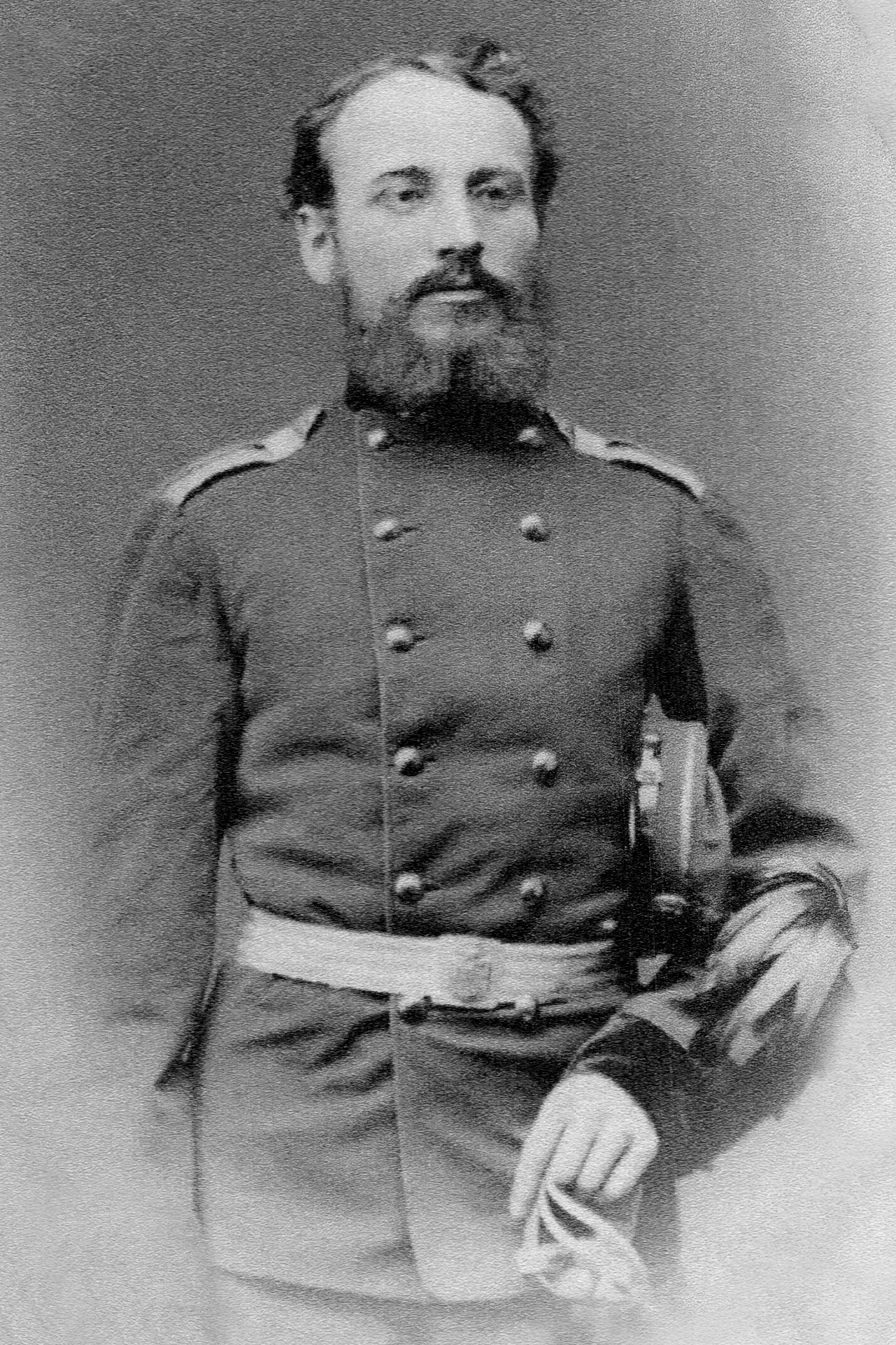
Sava Grujić

Pavle Šafarik

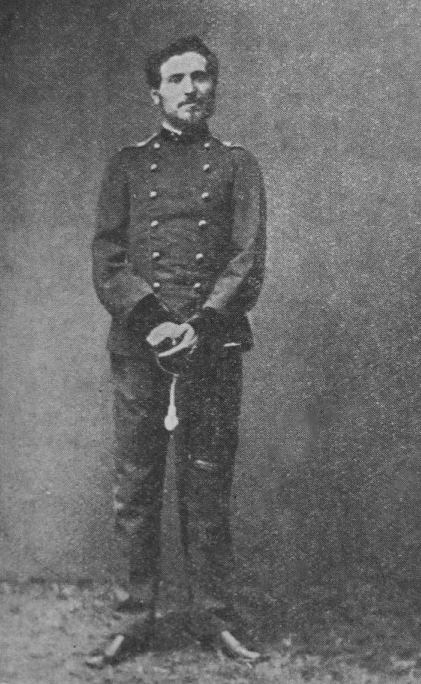
Radomir Putnik

Jevrem Velimirović

Jaša Marković

Ljubomir Durković

== Annotations ==
1. The contemporary Serbian spelling was Glavni odbor za srbsko oslobođenje (Главни одбор за србско ослобођење). It was also called Main Board for the Liberation of Serbs in Turkey (Главни одбор за ослобођење Срба у Турској/Glavni odbor za oslobođenje Srba u Turskoj). Other English translations include "Main Serbian Liberation Committee" and "Committee for Liberation".

== See also ==
- Serb revolutionary organizations

== Sources ==
Books

- Cenić, Mita; Perović, Latinka (1988). Izabrani spisi. Rad. ISBN 9788609001451.
- Maksimović, Ivan; Simeunović, Dragan (1997). Život i delo Svetozara Markovića: zbornik radova sa naučnog skupa Srpske akademije nauka i umetnosti, održanog 16. i 17. oktobra 1996. godine u Beogradu i 18. oktobra 1996. godine u Zaječaru. Belgrade: Zavod za udžbenike i nastavna sredstva. ISBN 9788617056269.
- Nedeljković, Dušan (1977). Naučni skup Svetozar Marković, život i delo: 24-27. novembar 1975. Srpska akademija nauka i umetnosti.
- Gavrilović, Slavko; Krestić, Vasilije; Radenić, Andrija; Milutinović, Kosta; Ivić, Pavle; Kašić, Jovan; Živković, Dragiša; Medaković, Dejan (1981). Stojančević, Dejan (ed.). Istorija srpskog naroda: Od Prvog ustanka do Berlinskog kongresa (1804-1878). Vol. 2. Belgrade: Srpska književna zadruga.
- Spasić, Živomir (1975). Javnost Svetozara Markovića. Svetlost.
- Stojančević, Vladimir (1988). Serbia and the Bulgarians, 1804-1878. Prosveta.
- Stojančević, Vladimir (1990). Srbija i oslobodilački pokret na Balkanskom poluostrvu u XIX veku. Zavod za udžbenike i nastavna sredstva.
- Stokes, Gale (1990). Politics as Development: The Emergence of Political Parties in Nineteenth Century Serbia. Duke University Press. pp. 47–48. ISBN 9780822310167.
- Vojvodić, Vaso (1994). U duhu Garašaninovih ideja: Srbija i neoslobođeno Srpstvo : 1868-1876. Prosveta. ISBN 9788607007653.

Journals

- Terzić, Slavenko (1988) [1987]. "Jovan Ristić i zavetna misao srpska". Историјски часопис. 34 (XXXIV). Prosveta: 280– – via Google Books.
- MacKenzie, David (1992) [1991]. "Srbija kao Pijemont i jugoslovenska ideja (1804—1914)". Историјски часопис. 38. Prosveta: 205– – via Google Books.
- Grupa autora (1979). "Pirot 1877–1977". Pirotski zbornik. Sloboda.
- NASSS (1997). Serbian Studies. Vol. 11–12. NASSS. p. 13.
