= Jovan Sundečić =

Serbian Orthodox priest and poet (1825–1900)

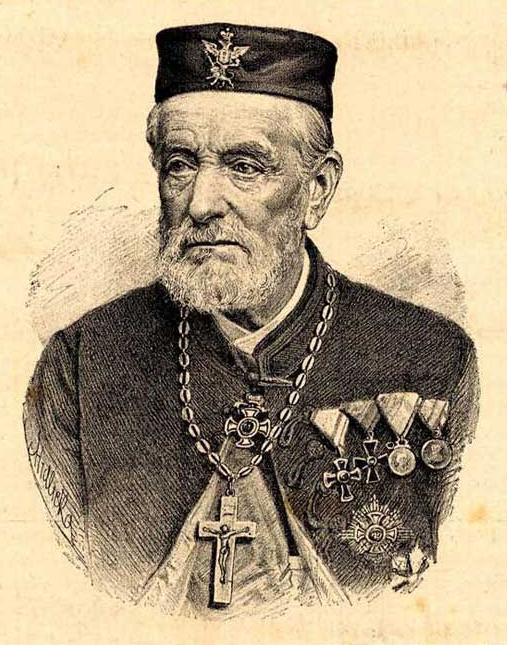
- Jovan Sundečić, circa 1897
- Born: June 24, 1825; Golinjevo, Bosnia Eyalet, Ottoman Empire
- Died: July 19, 1900 (aged 75); Kotor, Principality of Montenegro
- Education: Orthodox Seminary in Zadar (1843–1848)
- Occupations: Poet, Orthodox priest, political activist
- Employer: Prince Nikola I of Montenegro
- Known for: Author of Montenegrin anthem Ubavoj nam Crnoj Gori
- Notable work: Ne dajmo se!; Ubavoj nam Crnoj Gori
- Title: Secretary to Prince Nikola I
- Awards: Grand Cross of the Order of St Gregory the Great; Order of Prince Danilo I (1st rank)

Jovan Sundečić (Serbian Cyrillic: Јован Сундечић; 24 June 1825 – 19 July 1900) was a Serbian poet, priest of the Serbian Orthodox Church and a secretary to Prince Nikola I of Montenegro. He is most famous for writing lyrics of contemporary anthem of Montenegro Ubavoj nam Crnoj Gori (To Our Beautiful Montenegro).

== Biography ==
Sundečić was born in the village of Golinjevo, near Livno, Bosnia Eyalet, Ottoman Empire, (modern-day Bosnia and Herzegovina). His family is of the Šundić brotherhood from Župa near Nikšić in Old Herzegovina. After finishing the Orthodox Seminary in Zadar (1843-1848), Dalmatia province of the Austrian Empire and becoming a priest, he was assigned parish priest and teacher to the Serb colony of Peroj in Istria, Austrian Littoral. After working as a professor at the Zadar Seminary, he became famous as a "priest-poet" and political and national activist, because of which he decided to move to Montenegro. Prince Nicholas I named him his personal secretary in 1864, a post on which Jovan worked until his retirement in 1874, though he remained honorary secretary until his death.

In 1865 Jovan Sundečić founded the Orlić (Орлић) yearly, the second publication in Montenegro. He was also the editor and owner of the first Montenegrin weekly, The Montenegrin (Црногорац) of Duke Sima Popović, which was published from 1871 to 1873, as well as the owner of the first Montenegrin literary magazine The Montenegriness (Црногорка) from 1871. Sundečić, Milan Kostić, and Vasa Pelagić were instrumental in establishing "The Montenegrin Warrior," a literary association, in Cetinje in February 1872. The association had great success in educating the Serb youth of Montenegro. At the time he was one of the founding members of the newly established Association for Serb Liberation and Unification.

Sundečić's Ne dajmo se! (Let's not surrender!), a lyric poem, for the Congress of the Union of Choral Societies, was welcomed instantly with great enthusiasm. That poem, turned into a song by Czech composer Vojtĕch Hlaváč (1849-1911), very effectively urged the youth to fight for their aims, and was also adopted as an anthem of the Choral Society of Vršac.

Pope Leo XIII and Prince Nicholas I of Montenegro concluded -- "Ugovor između Svete Stolice i Crnogoske Vlade u položaju katoličkih i arhiepiskopa barskog. Ugovor su potpisali kardinal Lodoviko Jakobini, sa strane Svete Stolice i državni tajnik Jovan Sundečić, sa crnogorske strane"— a Concordat in Rome on 18 August 1886. The signatories were Cardinal Luigi Jacobini (1832-1887) for the Holy See, and Nikola's secretary Jovan Sundečić for Montenegro, who was awarded the Grand Cross of the Order of St Gregory the Great by Pope Leo XIII.

From 1892 to 1894 Jovan also worked as editor of Education (Просвјета). He contributed greatly to education in Montenegro by drafting the Statute and completely organizing the renewed Cetinje Seminary in 1869, which was subsequently transformed into the Seminary Teachers' School. An active diplomat, Nicholas sent Jovan on numerous missions. For his works, he was awarded 1st rank of the Order of Prince Danilo I, the highest Montenegrin medal. He retired and settled in Kotor, Principality of Montenegro, where he died on 6 July 1900.

In 1865 at his Cetinje-based Orlic Jovan published his poem dedicated to Prince Nikola, the "Montenegrin National anthem", a proposition for an anthem of the newly arising Montenegrin realm. In 1870 on Lučindan it was for the first time publicly sang accompanied with lyrics. It was sung in the rooms of the Cetinje Reading Room the Serb Vocal Society Unity from Kotor of Petar II Petrović Njegoš. The bandmaster was the choirmaster of the Czech Society Antun Shultz. The next day, on 18 October 1870, the poem was under its new name To Our Beautiful Montenegro handed over to Nikola I, who used it as the state anthem of Montenegro until its statehood was extinguished with the unification of Yugoslavia. The Montenegrin composer Jovan Đurov Ivanišević adapted the music better in 1887 in his published songs in Prague. It was then, by the order of the Ministry of Education, proclaimed as the only state anthem. After the recognition of an independent Princedom of Montenegro at the 1878 Congress of Berlin, "To Our Beautiful Montenegro" became a standard protocol song in Cetinje.

In 1878 Jovan Sundečić together with the Ragusans Luko Zore, Medo and his brother Niko Pucić, Vjekoslav Pretner, Pero Budmani, Antun Paško Kazali, Ivan August Kaznačić and Vuk Vrčević founded the pro-Serbian, Dubrovnik-based publication, "Slovinac". Sundečić kept in close touch with Antonije Stražičić, a Serb from Dubrovnik, who launched a weekly journal called "Napredak" (Progress) in Sarajevo in 1890. The Austrian authorities requested information about Stražičić from authorities in Zadar where he lived for a while. According to the furnished data Stražičić was a Serb belonging to the Old Catholic faith (staro-katolička veroispovest) whose political and cultural interests were aligned with the Serbian party, better known as the Serb-Catholic circle, headed by Medo Pucić.

== Sources ==
- Jovan Skerlić, Istorija Nove Srpske Književnosti (Belgrade, 1921), pages 294-296.
