= Dragutin Pećić =

Serbian politician and lawyer

Dragutin Pećić (Jagodina, Principality of Serbia, 16 January 1871 - Belgrade, 1948) was a Serbian politician and lawyer. He was also the founder and chairman of the Central Bank and the Yugoslav Insurance Company.

== Biography ==
Drgutin Pećić was born in Jagodina in 1871 to father Dobroslav, a merchant, and mother Katarina (née Damjanović). He completed his elementary education in Jagodina and Gymnasium in Belgrade before enrolling in Law School of the Velika škola in Belgrade. Upon graduation in 1895, he opened his own practice in Belgrade and joined the popular People's Radical Party (NRS). In the Radical cabinet of Nikola Pašić in 1905 Pećić was Minister of Justice. Later as a member of the Cabinet of Ljubomir Davidović, he was appointed Minister of Construction from 27 July 1924 to 6 November 1924. In 1925 he was a member of the Democratic Party.

He was a Member of Parliament (MP) in three cabinets from 1903 to 1929.

As a retired government minister, Dragutin Pećić was one of the founders and chairman of the Centralna Banka (Central Bank) and a founding member of the Executive Committee of the Yugoslav Insurance Company Limited in Belgrade.

== Personal life ==
He was married to Jela Savić and they had three children, two sons and a daughter.

== See also ==
- Milenko Radomar Vesnić
- Gliša Geršić
