= United Serb Youth =

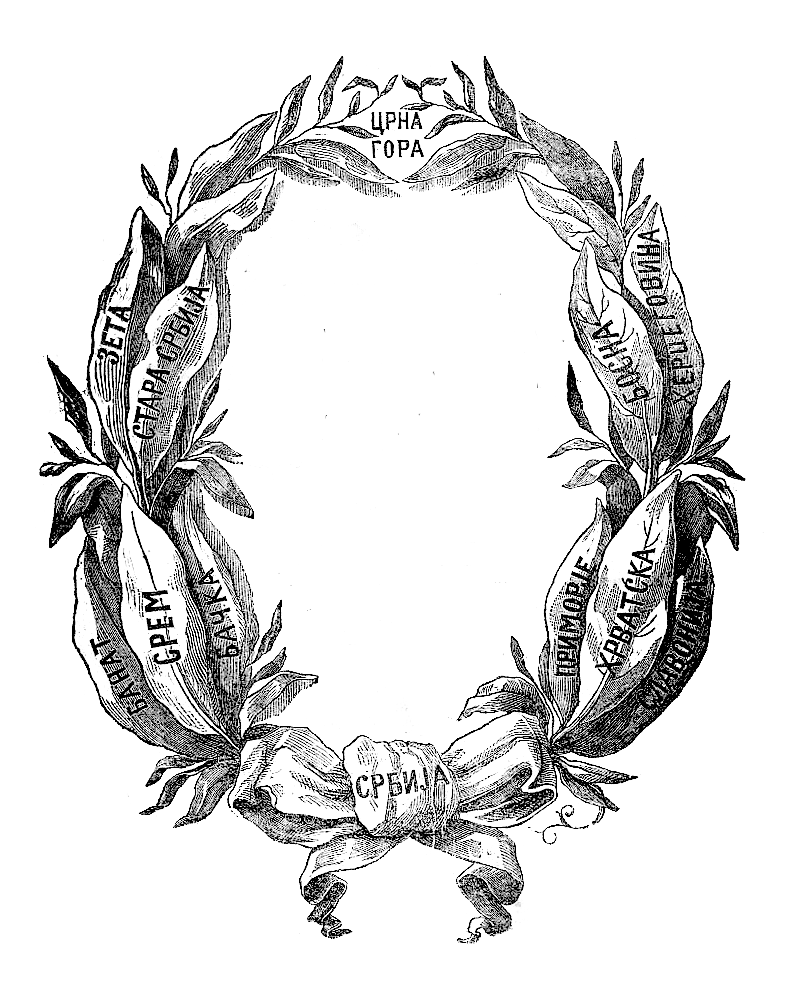
- Formation: 1866
- Dissolved: 1872
- Legal status: Political organization
- Location: Novi Sad, Habsburg monarchy
- Official language: Serbian

The United Serb Youth (Serbian: Уједињена омладина српска, romanized: Ujedinjena omladina srpska), also known as Omladina ("the Youth"), was a diverse progressive Serbian political, cultural and national movement active between 1866 and 1872 among Prečani Serbs in Austria-Hungary as well as among Serbs in the Principality of Serbia itself. It was founded on the initiative of Vienna-based Zora association at the congress of 16 youth organizations which took place in Novi Sad (at the time center of Serbian culture) between 15 and 18 August 1866. Alongside promotion of Serb emancipation and liberation, the movement was also expressly pan-Slavist advocating primarily for South Slavic cooperation. Numerous future prominent Serbian writers who participated in the group's work included among others Laza Kostić and Jovan Jovanović Zmaj.

Its slogan was Srpstvo sve i svuda ("Serbdom all and everywhere"). Two of its most prominent factions were liberal wing whose leader was Vladimir Jovanović and revolutionary wing with Svetozar Marković. The group was also notable for its rejection of conservative clericalism, and acceptance of linguistic ideas of Vuk Stefanović Karadžić. When the organization was banned both in Serbia and Austria-Hungary, the seat of Omladina became Cetinje, in the Principality of Montenegro. Their ideas were propagated in Glas Crnogorca, Cetinjski Vjesnik, and Pančevac. The Association for Serb Liberation and Unification was founded by members of the United Serbian Youth and other people from all over the Serbian lands.

United Serbian Youth, modeled after Giuseppe Mazzini's Giovane Italia, with whom they directly collaborated, was one of the first organizations to raise the question of women's emancipation. The first Serbian women's society was established in Novi Sad, then part of Hungarian-controlled Vojvodina in 1864. After that a new, powerful political group also of liberal political orientation was formed by the Serbs of Vojvodina, with its leader Svetozar Miletić, which appeared at assemblies in Sremski Karlovci (1861, 1864). Miletić's supporters collaborated with the liberal Jovan Djordjević's journal Srbski dnevnik ("Serbian Diary"), spreading their ideas, like Miletić's own journal Zastava ("Flag") as well as founding various societies preceding the United Serbian Youth. The most important among these was the first society of pupils and students, Preodnica ("Predecessor"), founded in Pest in 1861 as well as the imitator of the United Serbian Youth, the society Zora ("Dawn"), founded in Vienna in 1862.

== Members ==
In 1866, some 400 representatives of Serb youth from Serbian-populated territories ("Serb lands") met in Novi Sad and founded the United Serb Youth. Among notable members were:

- Aleksandar Sandić
- Jevrem Grujić
- Laza Kostić
- Jovan Jovanović Zmaj
- Svetozar Miletić
- Svetozar Marković
- Nikola Pašić
- Nikola I Petrović of Montenegro
- Marko Miljanov Popović
- Mašo Vrbica
- Lazar Tomanović
- Antonije Hadžić
- Vladimir Jovanović
- Valtazar Bogišić
- Draga Dejanović
- Vaso Pelagić
- Sava Bjelanović
- Alimpije Vasiljević
- Milan Kujundžić Aberdar
- Gligorije "Giga" Geršić
- Jovan Turoma

== See also ==
- Serb revolutionary organizations

== Annotations ==
- Also United Serbian Youth.
