= Ubavoj nam Crnoj Gori =

National anthem

English: To Our Beautiful Montenegro
- Убавој нам Црној Гори
- Former national anthem of Montenegro
- Lyrics: Jovan Sundečić
- Music: Jovo Ivanišević
- Adopted: 1870
- Relinquished: 1918 (de facto), 1922 (de jure)
- Succeeded by: " Himna Srba, Hrvata i Slovenaca" (as the anthem of Kingdom of Serbs, Croats and Slovenes)

Audio sample
- "Ubavoj nam Crnoj Gori": file; help

"Ubavoj nam Crnoj Gori" (Serbian: Убавој нам Црној Гори, English: To Our Beautiful Montenegro) was the national and state anthem of the Kingdom of Montenegro in the late 19th-early 20th century. The educational system had an honorific song, the Hymn to Saint Sava, which was sung in the Saint's honour.

The lyrics were made in 1865 by the Serb poet and a priest named Jovan Sundečić, who was the secretary of Prince Nikola I of Montenegro. The music was composed by Jovo Ivanišević, drawing from "Uskliknimo s ljubavlju", hymn to Saint Sava and later adapted by Anton Schulz. The anthem was first performed on October 17, 1870, after which Prince Nikola declared it as the state anthem. In 1993, it was one of the proposals during the unsuccessful negotiations to adopt a regional anthem of the then-Yugoslav republic of Montenegro. The main problem was its monarchist lyrics, which were unfitting for Montenegro as at the time it was a republican state.

== Lyrics ==
Serbian Cyrillic	Serbian Latin	English
Убавој нам Црној Гори	Ubavoj nam Crnoj Gori	To Our Beautiful Montenegro
Убавој нам Црној Гори с поноситим брдима, Отаџбини што не двори, коју нашим мишицама Ми бранимо и држимо презирући невољу, — Добри Боже, сви Т' молимо: живи Књаза Николу!	Ubavoj nam Crnoj Gori s ponositim brdima, Otadžbini što ne dvori, koju našim mišicama Mi branimo i držimo prezirući nevolju, — Dobri bože, svi T' molimo: živi Knjaza Nikolu!	To our beautiful Montenegro with proud hills, Fatherland which doesn't serve, which with our muscles We defend and hold, despising any captivity,— Good God, we all pray to You: long live (Prince) King Nicholas!
Здрава, срећна, моћна, славна, — обћем врагу на ужас, Врлим претцим' у свем равна, свом народу на украс; Добрим блага, злијем строга; крста, дома, слободе Заштитника ревноснога, — храни нам Га, Господе!	Zdrava, srećna, moćna, slavna, — obćem vragu na užas, Vrlim pretcim' u svem ravna, svom narodu na ukras; Dobrim blaga, zlijem stroga; krsta, doma, slobode Zaštitnika revnosnoga, — hrani nam Ga, Gospode!	Healthy, happy, mighty, glorious,— common enemy's horror, To its virtuous ancestors equal, to its people beautiful; Meek to good, harsh to evil; of the cross, home, freedom Our jealous protector—keep Him, Lord!
Од коварства и напасти чувај Њег' и Његов Дом; Који сније Њем' пропасти — нека буде пропаст том! А коју му вјеру крши, — правда тог укротила, Крјепки Боже, све растр'си што нам злоба ротила.	Od kovarstva i napasti čuvaj Njeg' i Njegov Dom; Koji snije Njem' propasti — neka bude propast tom! A koju mu vjeru krši, — pravda tog ukrotila, Krjepki Bože, sve rastr'ci što nam zloba rotila.	From spoil and rot keep Him and His Home; Who dreams disaster to Him—may downfall strike him! And who breaks his faith,—may justice reach him, Dear God, you stomped everything that the malice bore to us.
Куд Он с нама, свуд' ми с Њиме крв смо љеват готови за Њ' за вјеру, наше име и за браћу у окови! Томе ћемо свету дугу одзивати се сваки час, — Боже, свеј нам буд'у у кругу, благосиљај Њег' и нас!	Kud On s nama, svud' mi s Njime krv smo ljevat gotovi za Nj' za vjeru, naše ime i za braću u okovi! Tome ćemo svetu dugu odzivati se svaki čas, — Bože, svej nam bud'u u krugu, blagosiljaj Njeg' i nas!	Where He goes with us, everywhere with Him we're prepared to shed our blood For Him for faith, our name and for brethren in chains! To this holy debt we will answer at any time,— God, be in our circle, bless and strengthen Him and us!

== Notes ==
1. Glas Crnogorca, October 19, 1999: Jovan Markuš: Двије црногорске химне
2. Ослобођење, независност и уједињење Србије и Црне Горе, Химне Србије и Црне Горе
3. Medijaklub:
