= Pavle Šafarik =

Serbian military officer

Pavle Šafarik (Serbian Cyrillic: Павле Шафарик; 15 April 1846 – fl. 1873) was a Serbian military officer, an artillery officer in the Serbian Army, and publisher. Born on 15 April 1846 in Belgrade, Principality of Serbia, Pavle was the son of the academic Janko Šafarik (1814–1876). After finishing primary school and seven grades of gymnasium, he enrolled in the Military Academy in Belgrade in 1861. In 1871–72, he joined the Serb revolutionary organization known as the Main Board for Serb Liberation, based in Kragujevac. At that time, he was an officer at the artillery administration. In March 1873, he co-founded the Kragujevac Social Press.

== Sources ==
- Spasić, Živomir (1975). Javnost Svetozara Markovića. Svetlost. pp. 23, 82, 92–.
- Vojvodić, Vaso (1994). U duhu Garašaninovih ideja: Srbija i neoslobođeno Srpstvo : 1868-1876. Prosveta. ISBN 9788607007653.
