= Pavel Rovinsky =

Russian historian, Slavist, ethnologist and geographer

- Па́вел Ровинский
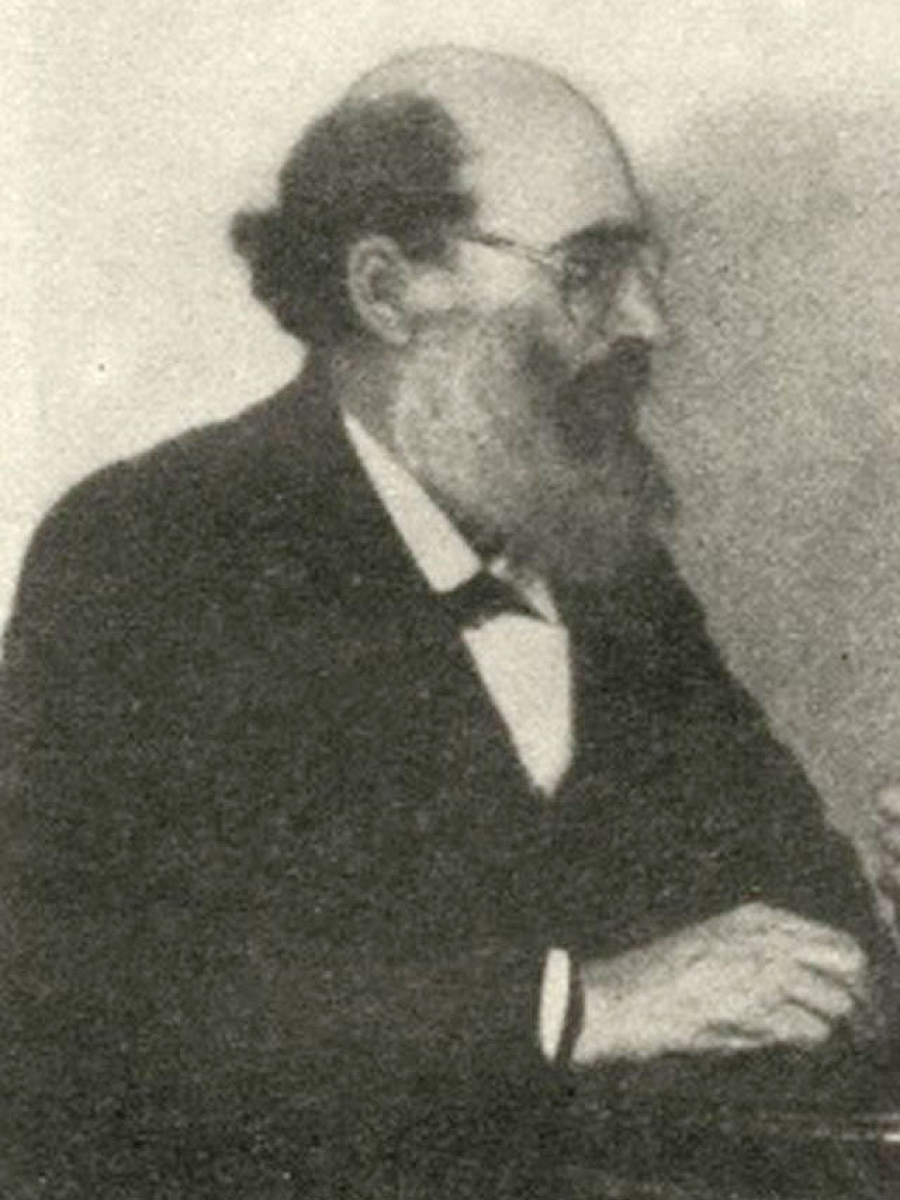
- Born: 22 February 1831; Gus'ovka, Russian Empire
- Died: 15 January 1916 (aged 84); Petrograd, Russian Empire
- Occupations: historian, Slavist, ethnologist and geographer

Pavel Apollonovich Rovinsky (Russian: Па́вел Аполло́нович Ровинский, 22 February 1831 — 15 January 1916) was Russian historian, Slavist, ethnologist and geographer.

== Early life and studies ==
Pavel Apollonovich Rovinsky was born on 22 February 1831 in Gus'ovka, a village in the Kamyshinsky Uyezd in the Russian Empire, to Apollon Ivanovich Rovinsky and Marya Andreevna Rovinskaya (née Zhukovskaya). Pavel's father was a nobleman and veteran of the Napoleonic Wars, and his mother was the daughter of a landowner.

Rovinsky enrolled at Saratov Gymnasium in 1842. Around 1844, he met Alexander Pypin with whom he attended an extracurricular history and literature club. Rovinsky and Pypin would stay close friends for the rest of their lives. He graduated in 1848, excelling in Greek.

Pavel studied philology at Kazan University from 1848 to 1852. There, he came under the influence of Victor Grigorovich, becoming an ardent Pan-Slavist. After graduating, Pavel lectured on the history of Russian literature at Kazan University. During this time, he became a member of Land and Liberty, advocating the abolition of serfdom and a progressive transformation of Russia. He gifted his inherited land to his peasants, leaving only what he thought necessary for his family. After leaving the university, Rovinsky moved to Saint Petersburg.

== Travels to Slavic lands ==
In 1860, Pavel had his first trip to the Slavic lands, which ended unsuccessfully. He and his companion were arrested by the Austrian police in Moravia, on suspicion of spreading dangerous propaganda against Austria. They were imprisoned for 10 days and then escorted to the Russian border. In 1864, Kazan University agreed to send him to Slavic lands once again, but he was forbidden to travel abroad. It was only in 1867 that Rovinsky, as a correspondent for the Sankt-Peterburgskie Vedomosti, got the chance to visit Croatia, Slavonia, as well as the Serbian lands of Austria.

He arrived in Budapest in early March 1868, continuing to Belgrade by ship. In early May, he arrived in Šabac by steamboat, after which he traveled up the Drina river valley on foot. He was hoping to reach Užice, and then continue along the Morava valleys, where he'd conduct his ethnographic research. He returned to Russia in 1871.

== Return to Russia and travel to Transbaikalia ==
Rovinsky returned from Serbia to Russia in 1871. He traveled to Siberia to study the Russian population in its Fast East. From Irkutsk, he makes several excursions to various regions of Transbaikalia arriving in Bichura on 20 July 1871, where he stayed for three months. After leaving Transbaikalia, he again ended up in Mongolia, joining a group of traveling salesmen along a new route through eastern Mongolia from Nerchinsk to China.

The caravan had to proceed not far from the place where Nikolay Chernyshevsky was in exile. Rovinsky had close ties with the family of Chernyshevsky, with whom he met during his student days and who was the cousin of his friend Alexander Pypin. The father of Chernyshevsky's wife, Olga Sokratovna, was Rovinsky's godfather. He tried to reach Chernyshevsky to dissuade the fears of his family, and tried to get to his place of detention with the caravan. Repeatedly, their caravan was stopped by guards who were ordered to arrest anyone trying to associate with Chernyshevsky. In the end, he was forced to abandon this venture and follow the caravan to China.

== Director of an orphanage in Saint Petersburg ==
After returning from the Far East, Rovinsky returned to Saint Petersburg and took on the position of director of the "Agricultural Colony and Craft Shelter for Juvenile Delinquents", an orphanage in Polyustrovo. There, he led a simple life, no different from the life of the orphans and was very undemanding. Because of this, he was removed from his post. He served as the director from December 1873 until the first half of 1878.

== Travel to Bosnia and life in Montenegro ==
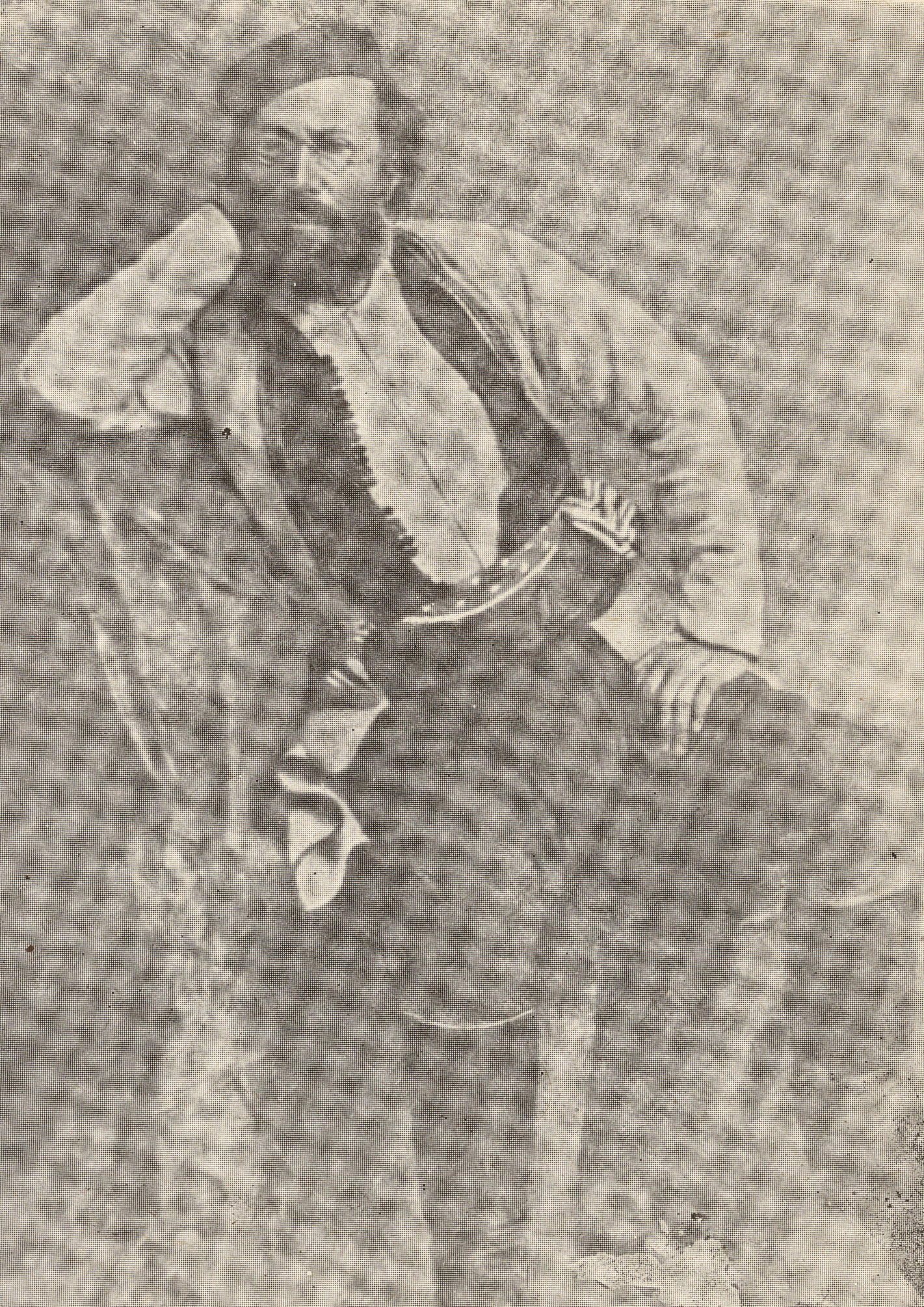
Rovinsky in traditional Montenegrin garb

Rovinsky accepted the offer of Alexey Suvorin, editor of the newspaper Novoye Vremya, and having left the post of director of the orphanage, went as a correspondent to Bosnia and Herzegovina. He arrived in Vienna on 10 June 1878 from where he reported on preparations for the occupation of Bosnia and Herzegovina. The Russo-Turkish War had just ended, however the future of the Balkans was still unsettled. Rovinsky responded to Austro-Hungarian preparations for the Bosnian campaign with a series of angry articles. Because of this, he was asked to leave Sarajevo six months later. In May 1879, he arrived in the Principality of Montenegro where, thanks to the help of his friend Alexander Pypin, he was promoted to freelance dragoman of the Russian diplomatic mission.

In 1890, the Montenegrin prince Nicholas, who took a liking to Rovinsky, unexpectedly invited him to excavate the ancient Roman city of Doclea. The excavations continued for several years. In the course of his work, a large archaeological collection was collected. On prince Nicholas' orders a place was freed up in the national library for finds from Doclea, and soon part of the library was turned into a museum run by Rovinsky. His excavations attracted a lot of attention. The Glas Crnogorca newspaper wrote about them, and the Russian Journal of the Ministry of National Education published a large essay by Rovinsky titled "The Excavation of Ancient Dioclea" in several of its issues. Soon after, Rovinsky was forced to leave this occupation, as he took up work on the history of Montenegro. During his stay, he also collected old folk songs and wrote various materials for Russian newspapers and magazines on life in Montenegro.

In 1898, Rovinsky, who was at that time a translator and consultant to the Russian diplomatic mission in Montenegro, returned to Saint Petersburg to publish the second volume of his work Montenegrin history, which he had worked on for about seven years. He continued living in Montenegro with short interruptions until the spring of 1906, for almost 27 years.

== Final years in Russia and death ==
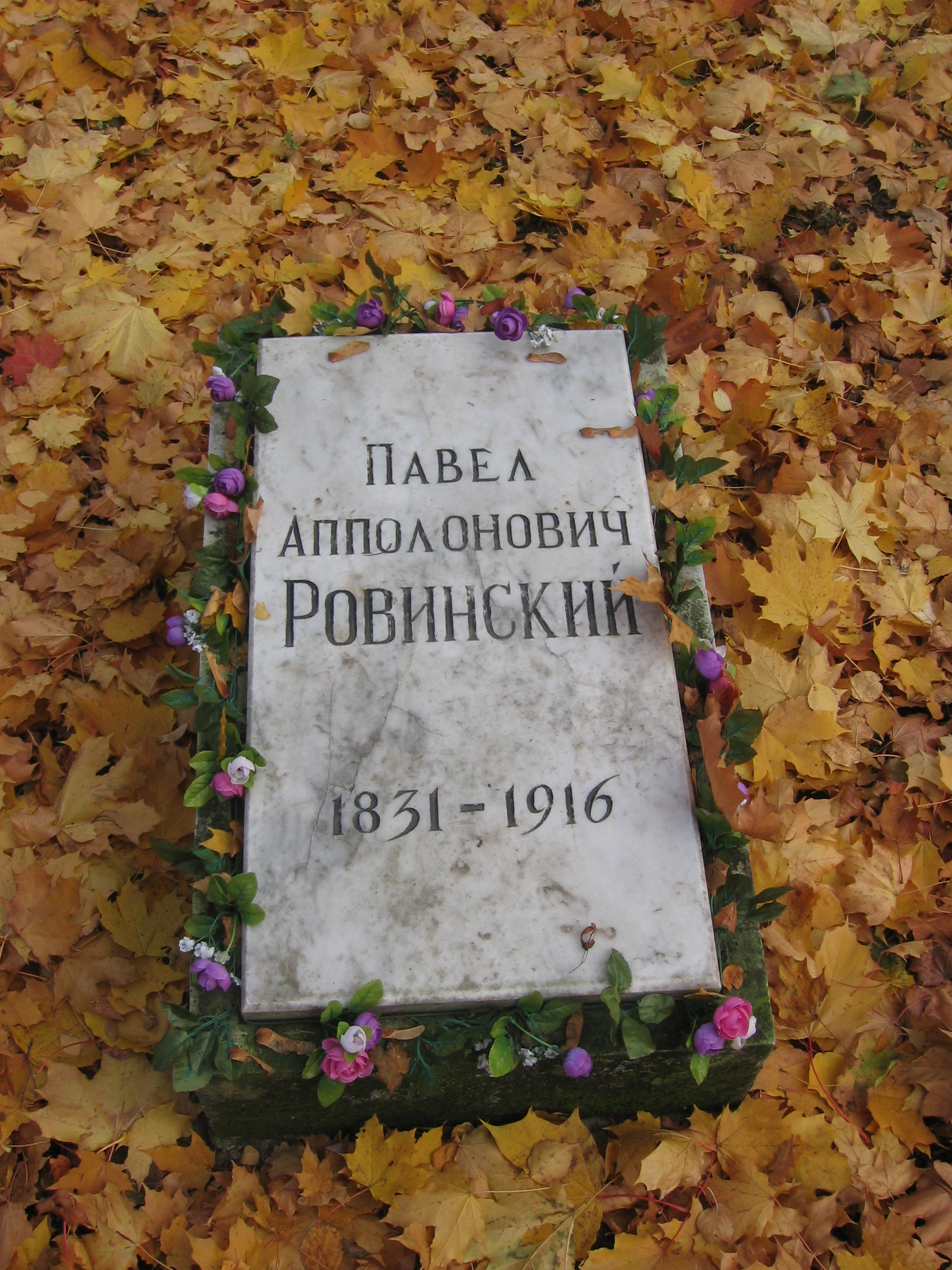
Tombstone of Pavel Rovinsky in St. Petersburg

In 1908, Rovinsky moved to Gatchina where he lived with his daughter Ekaterina and her family. He fell seriously ill in late 1915 and died on 15 January 1916. He was buried in the writers' footways section of Volkovo Cemetery in Saint Petersburg, where his rites were read by hieromonk Mardarije Uskoković. His burial was attended by Chernyshevsky's son Mikhail, Rovinsky's godson. Until 1974, his tombsone read "Revolutionary and member of Land and Liberty, P. A. Rovinsky".

== Legacy ==
An elementary school built in 1994 in Podgorica, Montenegro was named after him. A Society of Montenegrin-Russian Friendship (Serbian: Društvo crnogorsko-ruskog prijateljstva) founded in Podgorica on 24 November 2007 also bears Pavel's name.

== Selected works ==
- Obodska štamparija na Rijeci Crnojevića u Crnoj Gori i njen značaj na slovenskom jugu, Odbor za proslavu četiristogodišnjice Obodske štamparije, 1893
- Crna Gora u svojoj prošlosti i sadašnjosti (Montenegro in its Past and Present), ISBN 86-7079-022-X,
- Zapisi O Srbiji, 1868-1869: Iz Putnikovih Beležaka, ISBN 86-363-0288-9
