= Glas Crnogorca =

Voice of Montenegro Glas Crnogorca / Глас Црногорца
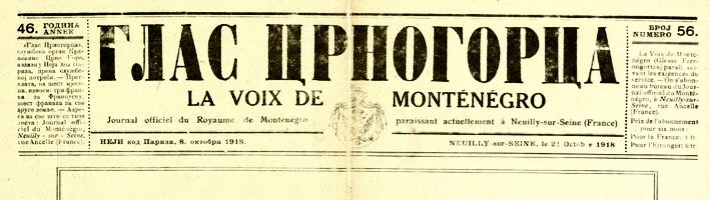
- Type: Weekly gazette
- Format: Berliner
- Founded: 21 January 1871
- Ceased publication: 18 June 1922
- Political alignment: Petrović-Njegoš dynasty
- Language: Serbian (today Montenegrin)
- Headquarters: Cetinje

The Voice of a Montenegrin (Serbian: Glas Crnogorca / Глас Црногорца) was a weekly newspaper published in Cetinje between 1873 and 1916. After the Serbian annexation of Montenegro in 1918, the newspaper continued to be published in exile until 1922. It was the official gazette of the Principality of Montenegro and later the Kingdom of Montenegro.

The newspaper was the direct successor of the first Montenegrin newspaper, "Montenegrin" (Serbian: Crnogorac / Црногорац), which was published from 1871 until 1873.

== History ==
=== Origins and the first publication ===
Montenegrin, the first newspaper of Montenegro, began its publication on January 21, 1871 in Cetinje, then capital of the Principality of Montenegro. From its beginnings it was funded by the state of Montenegro. The official owner and first editor-in-chief was Jovan Sundečić, writer and secretary of the Petrović-Njegoš dynasty. During its existence, Montenegrin was also distributed in Austria-Hungary, where it had about 700 subscribers.

=== Publishing ===
In January 1873, the Austro-Hungarian authorities banned the distribution of Montenegrin in their territory, linking it to a forbidden nationalist organization, United Serb Youth. In February 1873, Montenegrin stopped being published. In April 1873, the newspaper resumed publication under its new name, Voice of Montenegro, after which it was again distributed to the territories of Austria-Hungary and the Kingdom of Serbia. The first editor-in-chief of the new paper was Simo Popović, writer and politician from Vojvodina (then part of Austria-Hungary). Other notable editors included writer Laza Kostić and politician Lazar Tomanović.

After the January 1916 Montenegrin capitulation in the World War I and later the unification of Montenegro with Serbia in 1918, it continued to be periodically published from January 1917 to June 18, 1922, in Paris and Rome, as the official newspaper of the Montenegrin government-in-exile.
