= Milica Stojadinović-Srpkinja =

Serbian poet (1828–1878)

- Portrait of poet Milica Stojadinović-Srpkinja
- Born: 6 July 1828; Bukovac, Petrovaradin, Austrian Empire
- Died: 25 July 1878 (aged 50); Belgrade, Principality of Serbia
- Occupation: Poet

Milica Stojadinovic-Srpkinja (Serbian Cyrillic: Милица Стојадиновић Српкиња, pronounced [mîlitsa stɔjadǐːnɔv̞itɕ sr̩̂pkiɲa]) (1828–1878) was a Serbian poet, sometimes called "the greatest female Serbian poet of the 19th century".

== Life and work ==
Raised in the family of the priest Vasilije Stojadinović, she was among rare Serbian women in the early 19th century who could read and write both in Serbian and German languages. She started writing at a very young age and published her first poem Mladi Srbin (The Young Serb) in Srbski narodni list (Serbian National Journal) in 1845. Her first book of poems was published in 1850. Written in 1854, her journal U Fruškoj gori (In Fruška Gora) represents a unique collection of fairy tales, beliefs, sayings, and customs. The peak of her public activity was going to Vienna in 1850 at the invitation of Vuk Karadžić, who used her materials for his work.

== Career ==
As her fame spread beyond the confines of Serbian culture of the Austrian Empire, Prince Mihailo Obrenović would invite her to court when she came to Belgrade and Vienna-based anthropologist and poet Johann Gabriel Seidl devoted a poem to her.

She corresponded extensively with writers Đorđe Rajković (1825–1886), Ljubomir Nenadović, Vuk Stefanović Karadžić and his daughter Wilhelmine/Mina, Božena Němcová, and Ludwig August von Frankl. In 1891, an almanach Die Dioskuren was issued in Vienna by Ludwig von Frankl with a collection of letters written by Milica Stojadinović.

== Reception ==
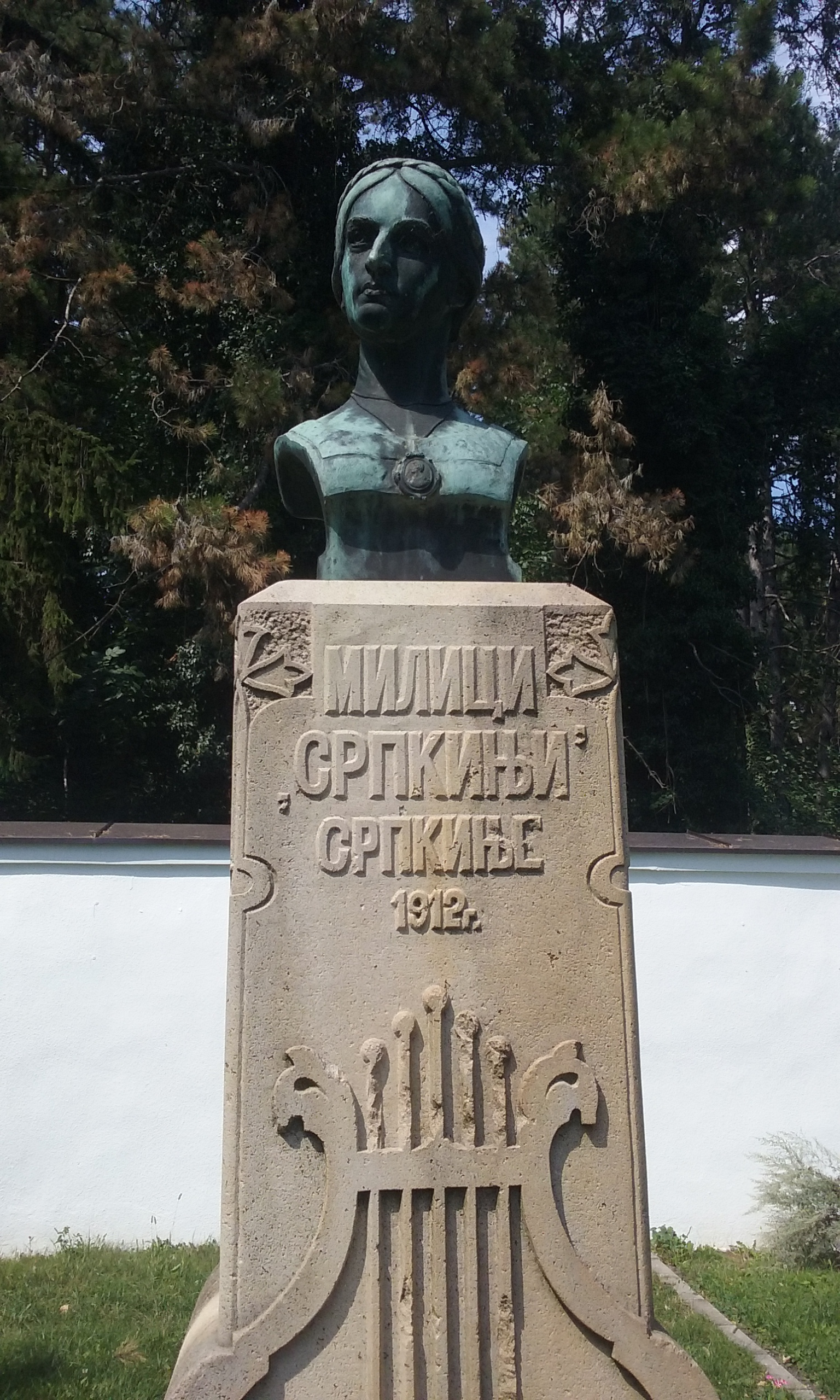
Bust of Milica Stojadinović-Srpkinja in Vrdnik-Ravanica Monastery

Her work, though, has been mostly out of the public eye and almost forgotten except by literary experts for most of the 20th century, first during fin-de-siècle modernist poeticism as an outdated poetic form of pre-1870s, and later, under Communist rule as an unacceptable expression of patriotism for only one of the six nations of Yugoslavia (namely: Serbian).

After Josip Broz Tito's death the awareness of her work was revived, and in the last quarter of a century a four-day poetry memorial is convened annually in Novi Sad in her honour, where a poetry prize bearing her name is awarded to prominent poets from Serbia.

Biljana Dojčinović has written on the role of Stojadinović-Srpkinja in the development of women's writing in Serbia, through a feminist framework.

== Milica Stojadinović-Srpkinja award ==
Milica Stojadinović-Srpkinja literary award was established in her honor in 1994. It was awarded to many prominent authors, such as Mira Alečković, Jara Ribnikar, Matija Bećković, Boško Petrović, etc.

Since 2009 the rules have been modified so that the award can only be given to women poets.

== See also ==
- Eustahija Arsić
- Ana Marija Marović
- Princess Anka Obrenović
- Staka Skenderova
- Draga Dejanović

== Sources ==
- Jovan Skerlić, Istorija Nove Srpske Književnosti / History of Modern Serbian Literature (Belgrade, 1914, 1921), p. 208. Her biography was translated from Skerlić's Serbian into English for this entry in the Wikipedia.
