= Mašo Vrbica =

Montenegrin vojvoda and military commander

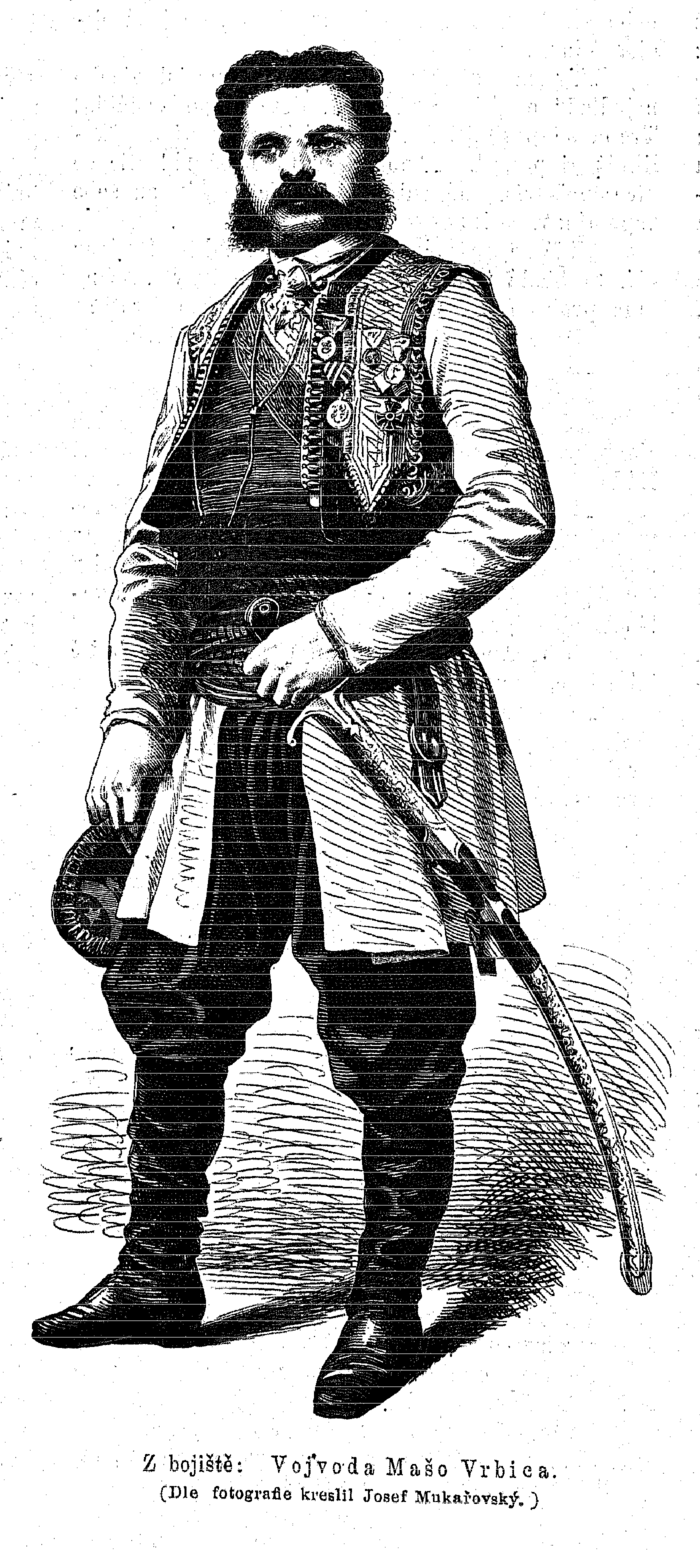
Vrbica portrayed by Josef Mukařovský and depicted in Světozor, 25 August 1876.

Mašo Vrbica (Serbian Cyrillic: Машо Врбица; 1833 in Vrba – 10 May 1898 in Banja Luka) was a Montenegrin vojvoda and military commander.

== Biography ==
He graduated from the Mikhailovskaya Artillery Military Academy in St. Petersburg.

After his return to Montenegro, he was appointed as a captain in the Njeguši militia, which was part of the Montenegrin army. He commanded a unit at the Battle of Grahovac in 1858, and with the cannon captured there organized the artillery for Montenegrin army. During the Montenegrin-Ottoman War of 1861-1862, he commanded the artillery.

Between the wars he joined the nationalist "United Serbian Youth" where he met such men as Vladimir Jovanović, Svetozar Miletić, Nikola Pašić, Nikola Petrovic, Marko Popovic Miljanov, and Valtazar Bogišić.

In 1875 Vrbica was given the title of vojvoda. He was a liaison of Montenegro to the Serbian Supreme Command during the Serbo-Turkish War (1876–78), during which he commanded Montenegrin dragoons in the battles of Aleksinac and Deligrad (20–21 October 1876).

He was appointed Montenegrin Minister of Internal Affairs in 1877. He commanded the Montenegrin forces in the attack on Nikšić. Strategically, he took Trebješka Glava, where he placed the artillery that supported the attack on the town. After the fall of Nikšić, his main effort was in clearing out the Ottoman troops in the area. He took three battalions and on 16 September captured the fort at Bilek, on 25 September he captured the fortifications at Dugskogo Pass. In November 1877 he laid siege to Stari Bar, taking the coastal port and eventually the town in January 1878.

Vrbica headed several large construction works in Montenegro, notably the bridge over the Zeta in Danilovgrad, the road from Rijeka Crnojevića to Podgorica and the water supply in Cetinje.

On 16 May 1881, he was awarded the Russian Military Order of St. George.

Vrbica came into conflict with Prince Nikola, and defected to Austria-Hungary with his son Labud, who was married to Danica, the daughter of the Austro-Hungarian envoy to Montenegro, Theodor von Milinković. With the help of Milinković, Mašo Vrbica was awarded an estate near Banja Luka and a state pension. He remarried and spent his final years there. Prince Nikola denied him the right to be buried in Njeguši.

Vrbica died and was buried near Banja Luka in 1898. His remains were transferred and reburied by the St Petka Church in Vrba, Njeguši on 17 November 2007.
