= Đorđe Rajković =

Serbian writer, teacher and editor (1825-1886)

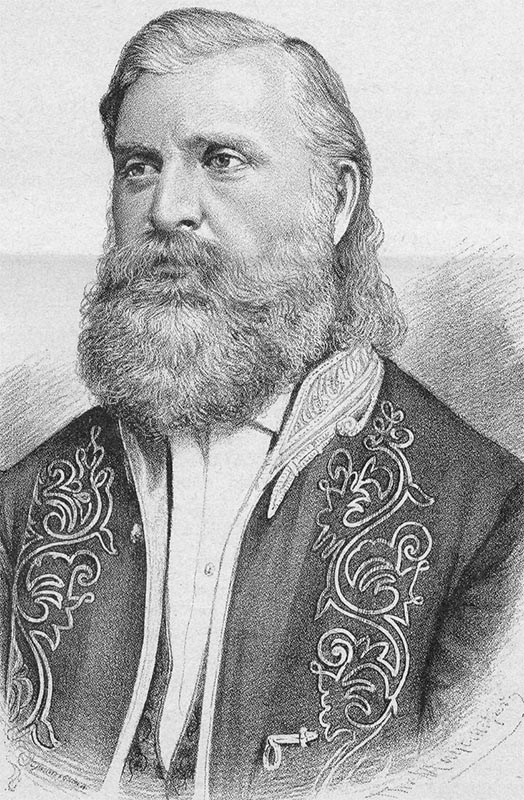
- Born: 5 May 1824; Novi Sad, Austrian Empire
- Died: 28 July 1886 (aged 62); Novi Sad, Austria-Hungary
- Writing career
- Genre: Poetry

Đorđe Rajković (Serbian: Ђорђе Рајковић; 5 May 1824 - 28 July 1886) was a Serbian writer, teacher, and editor of numerous journals and periodicals. He collected and preserved old archives and manuscripts. He collaborated with Vuk Karadžić on epic poems he collected throughout Slavonia among the Serbian population. He was a member of Matica Srpska.

== Biography ==
In 1844, at the age of nineteen, he had his first poem Jed i med published, followed by Pesme. All the documents published by Đorđe Rajković, particularly the ones he discovered in the archives of Upper Karlovci eparchy and in the bishop's archives at Plaški, tie in with the broader endeavors of the Metropolitanate of Karlovci and Serbian church councils to legally define the status of the Serbian people in the 18th century Habsburg monarchy. The position according to Serbian and official Austrian interpretation was based on the records found in the archives. Rajković was a friend and collaborator of Milica Stojadinović-Srpkinja, and he published her biography in the newspaper Putnik in 1862.

== Works ==
- Izabrani spisi: biografije književnika, Volume 1
- Faksimile od rukopisa znameniti Srba: Skupio, Volume 1
- Srpske narodne pesme iz Slavonije
