= Kragujevac Social Press =

The Kragujevac Social Press or Kragujevac Social Printing Works or Associated Printing Press of Kragujevac was established in March 1873 by a group of progressive citizens, Liberals and leftists. Kragujevac was the most sophisticated of the provincial Serbian cities, and had an intelligentsia second only to Belgrade. Among the founders were Sava Grujić, the president, and Pavle Šafarik, both members of the Main Board for Serb Liberation revolutionary organization led by socialist Jevrem Marković. When Jovan Ristić fell out in early November 1873, new Interior Minister Aćim Čumić permitted for more freedom of press, leading the Kragujevac Social Press to start a Radical newspaper. Svetozar Marković, a socialist and the younger brother of Jevrem Marković, accepted editorship. Javnost ("The Public") became Serbia's second socialist newspaper.

== Organizers ==
- Sava Grujić, officer at the State Munitions Works. (President)
- Pavle Šafarik, officer.
- Todor Tucaković, well-known Liberal.
- Paja Vuković, president of the town council.
- Jovan Jovanović, prota (priest) and outspoken supporter of freedom of speech.
- Svetozar Marković, socialist. (Editor)

== Sources ==
- Spasić, Živomir (1975). Javnost Svetozara Markovića. Svetlost.
- Stokes, Gale (1990). Politics as Development: The Emergence of Political Parties in Nineteenth Century Serbia. Duke University Press. pp. 47–48. ISBN 9780822310167.
- Vojvodić, Vaso (1994). U duhu Garašaninovih ideja: Srbija i neoslobođeno Srpstvo : 1868-1876. Prosveta. ISBN 9788607007653.
- Živković, Milovan (1968). Kragujevac: photo-monograph. Fond za turistićku izgradnju i propagandu; Turistićki savez opštine.
