= Association for Serb Liberation and Unification =

Serb revolutionary organization

- Formation: September 1871
- Type: secret revolutionary organisation
- Locations: *Cetinje; Novi Sad; Belgrade
- Key people: see list

Association for Serb Liberation and Unification (Serbian Cyrillic: Дружина за ослобођење и уједињење српско) or Society for Serb Liberation and Unification (Друштво за ослобођење и уједињење српско), commonly known as "the Association", was a Serb revolutionary organisation (national liberation movement) based in Cetinje, established in 1871, with the aim of liberating Serb-inhabited territories from the hands of the Ottoman Empire. The Association founded several boards (odbori): in Cetinje, in Novi Sad, and in Belgrade. At the same time, the Main Board for Serb Liberation (Главни одбор за српско ослобођење was established in Kragujevac with the same goals.

== History ==
The Association was founded by members of the "United Serbian Youth" (Уједињена омладина српска) and other patriots from all over the Yugoslav lands. This was secretly done after the baptism of Montenegrin Prince Nicholas' daughter.

== Members ==
- Prince Nicholas I of Montenegro
- Milan Kostić
- Miša Dimitrijević
- Milan Kujundžić Aberdar
- Vasa Pelagić
- Svetozar Marković
- Jovan Sundečić
- Đorđe Đorđević Vojnović, son of Montenegrin-Russian noble and artillery commander Đorđe Vojnović.

== See also ==
- Serb revolutionary organizations
