= Jovo Ivanišević =

Montenegrin composer

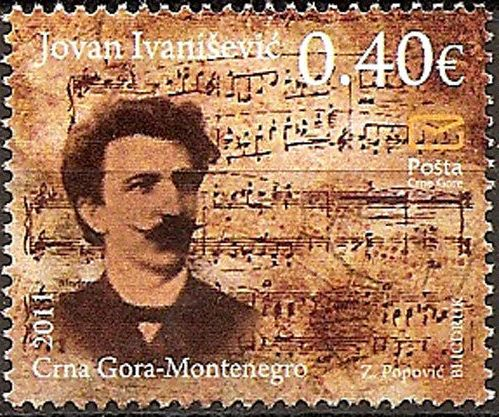

Jovan Đurov Ivanišević (1861–1889) was a Montenegrin composer from Donji Kraj near Cetinje, Montenegro. While young he showed exquisite talent for music, and is most famous for composing the contemporary anthem of Principality of Montenegro and Kingdom of Montenegro, Ubavoj nam Crnoj Gori (To Our Beautiful Montenegro). He died while being a student of the Prague Conservatory: while ice skating on the Vltava, the ice broke under him and he drowned.
