= Laza Kostić =

Serbian writer and politician (1841–1910)

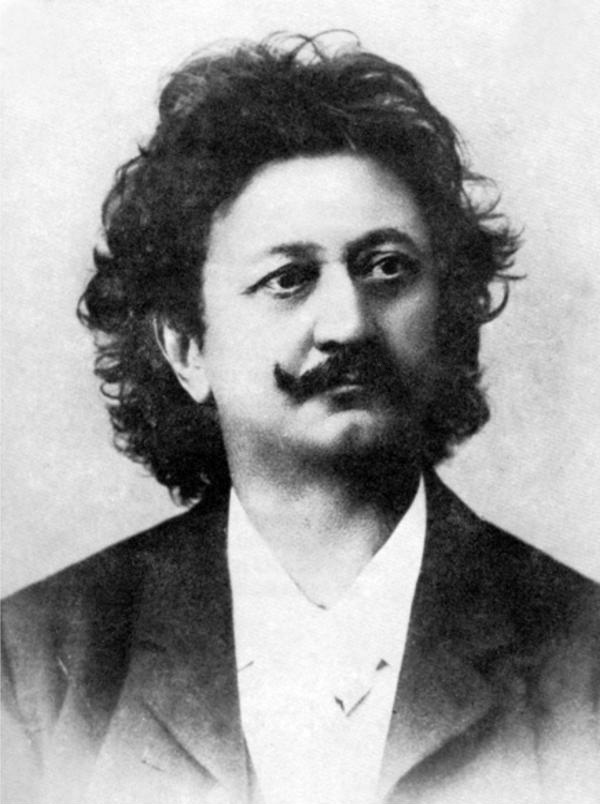
- Born: Lazar Kostić; 12 February 1841; Kabol, Austrian Empire (modern-day Serbia)
- Died: 27 November 1910 (aged 69); Vienna, Austria-Hungary
- Resting place: Sombor, Serbia
- Education: University of Budapest
- Occupations: poet, dramatist, journalist
- Spouse: Juliana Palanački
- Writing career
- Pen name: Laza Kostić
- Language: Serbian
- Period: 1868–1910
- Genre: romanticism
- Notable works: Santa Maria della Salute; Među javom i med snom

Lazar Kostić (Serbian Cyrillic: Лазар Костић; 12 February 1841 – 27 November 1910) was a Serbian poet, prose writer, lawyer, aesthetician, journalist, publicist, and politician. He is considered to be one of the greatest minds of Serbian literature. Kostić wrote around 150 lyrics, 20 epic poems, three dramas, one monograph, several essays, short stories, and a number of articles. Kostić promoted the study of English literature and together with Jovan Andrejević-Joles was one of the first to begin the systematic translation of the works of William Shakespeare into the Serbian language. Kostić also wrote an introduction of Shakespeare's works to Serbian culture.

== Biography ==
Laza Kostić was born in 1841 in Kovilj, Vojvodina—which was then part of the Austrian Empire—to a military family. Kostić graduated from the Law School of the University of Budapest and received a Doctor of Philosophy in jurisprudence at the same university in 1866. A part of his thesis was about the Dušan's Code. After completing his studies, Kostić occupied several positions and was active in cultural and political life in Novi Sad, Belgrade, and Montenegro. He was one of the leaders of Ujedinjena omladina srpska (United Serb Youth) and was elected a Serbian representative to the Hungarian parliament, thanks to his mentor Svetozar Miletić. Because of his liberal and nationalistic views, Kostić had to leave Austria-Hungary. He returned home after several years in Belgrade and Montenegro.

From 1869 to 1872, Kostić was the president of Novi Sad's Court House and was virtually the leader of his party in his county. He was a delegate in the clerico-secular Sabor at Sremski Karlovci several times. He served as Lord Mayor of Novi Sad twice and also twice as Sajkasi delegate to the Parliament in Budapest.

After Svetozar Miletić and Jovan Jovanović Zmaj, Laza Kostić was the most active leader in Novi Sad; his politics were distinct from those of his associates but he was convinced his mission to save Serbia through art had been baulked by obscurantist courtiers. In 1867, the Austrian Empire became Austria-Hungary and the Kingdom of Hungary became one of two autonomous parts of the new state. This was followed by a policy of Hungarization of the non-Hungarian nationalities, most notably promotion of the Hungarian-language and suppression of Romanian and Slavic languages, including Serbian. As the chief defender of the United Serbian Youth movement, Kostić was especially active in securing the repeal of some laws imposed on his and other nationalities in the Austro-Hungarian Empire. When Mihailo Obrenović III, Prince of Serbia, was assassinated, the Austro-Hungarian authorities sought to falsely implicate Laza, his mentor Miletić, and other Serbian intellectuals in a murder plot. Kostić was arrested and incarcerated but like the rest of them he was later released. In 1868, the new Prince of Serbia was the fourteen-year-old Milan IV Obrenović, who had fallen in love with Laza's most recent work Maksim Crnojević, which had been released that year.

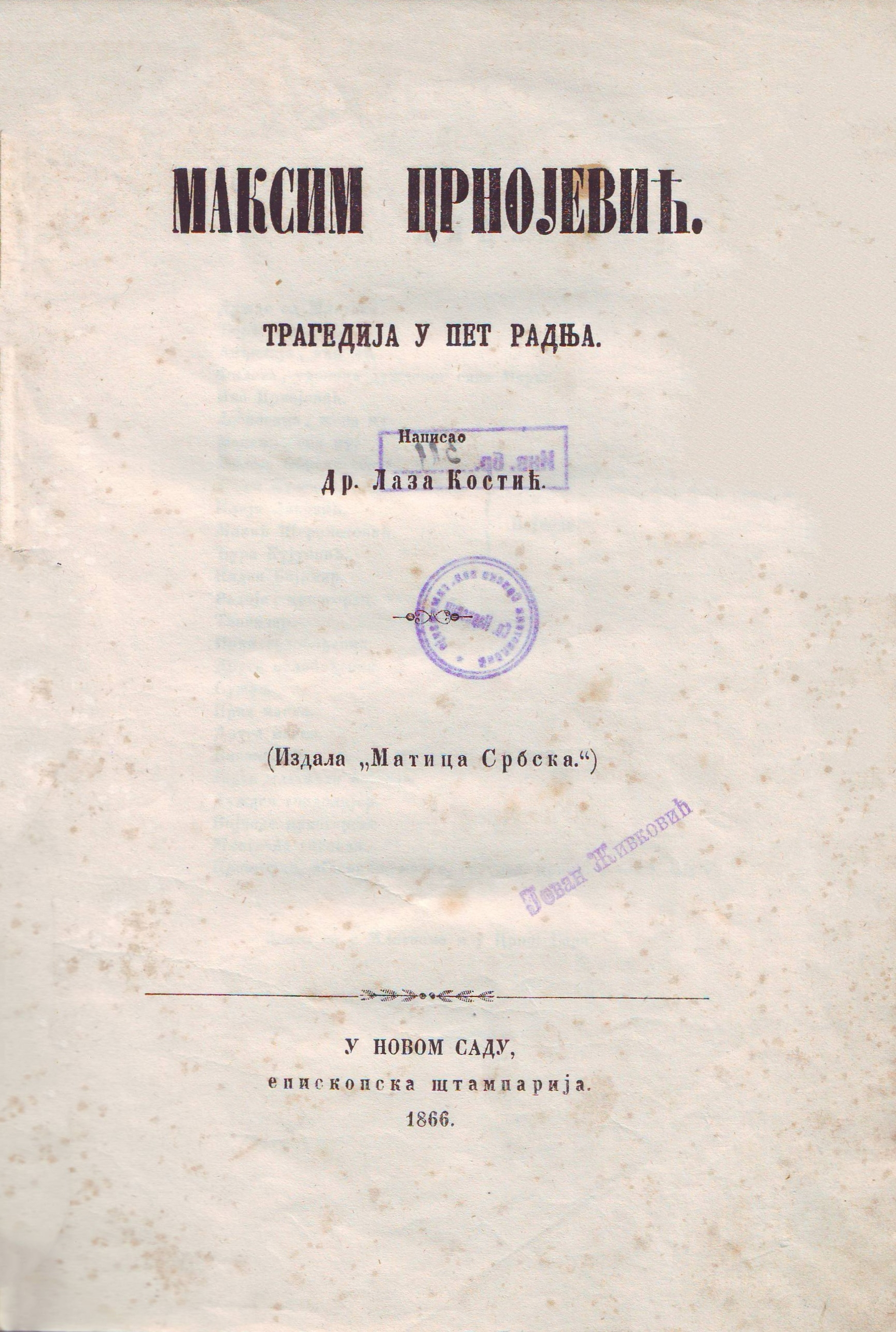
Front page of Kostić's play Maksim Crnojević, 1866

Kostić moved to Belgrade, where he became a popular figure as a poet. Through Milan's influence, Kostić obtained the position of editor of Srpsku nezavisnost (Serbian Independence), an influential political and literary magazine. Milan chose him to be Jovan Ristić's principal assistant at the 1878 Congress of Berlin and in 1880 Kostić was sent to Saint Petersburg as a member of the Serbian delegation. Belgrade's opposition parties began taking issue with Kostić's writings; he had boasted of his power over the King in jest but had disdain to make influential friends at court so in 1883 King Milan ask him to leave Belgrade for a time. Despite his bizarreness, Kostić was ranked a great poet and writer. Soon after, he took up residence in Cetinje and became editor-in-chief of the official paper of the Kingdom of Montenegro Glas Crnogoraca (The Montenegrin Voice), where he met intellectuals Simo Matavulj, Pavel Rovinsky, and Valtazar Bogišić. In 1890, Kostić moved to Sombor where he married Julijana Palanački in September 1895 and spent the rest of his life there. In Sombor he wrote a book which describes his dreams Dnevnik snova (Diary of Dreams), and the popular poem Santa Maria della Salute, which is considered the finest example of his love poems and elegies.

Kostić has been following two lines in his work and research: theoretical mind cannot reach absolute, not having the richness of fascination and life necessary to its universality. He was opposed to the anthropological philosophy of Svetozar Marković and the views of revolutionist and materialist Nikolay Chernyshevsky.

He died on 27 November 1910 in Vienna.

== Verse and prose ==
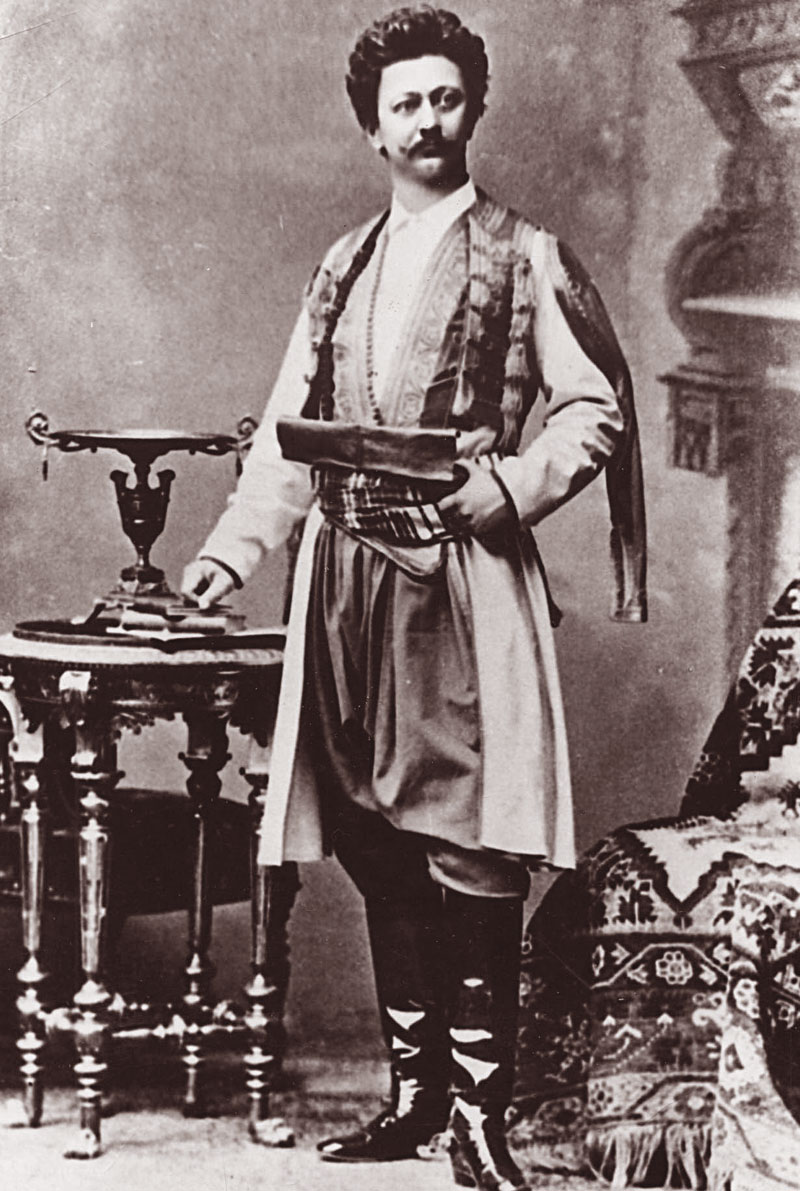
Laza Kostić in traditional clothes from Montenegro

In his poetry, Kostić often touched upon universal themes and human concerns, especially the relationships between man and God, society, and fellow humans. He contributed stylistic and linguistic innovations, experimenting freely, often at the expense of clarity. His work is closer to European Romanticism than that of any other Serbian poet of his time. Kostić attempted unsuccessfully in numerous, incomplete theoretical essays to combine the elements of the native folk song with those of European Romanticism. The lack of success can be attributed to the advanced nature of his poetry, the ideas of his time, and his eccentricity.

Of Kostić's plays. Maksim Crnojević (1863) represents the first attempt to dramatize an epic poem. Pera Segedinac (1875) deals with the struggle of the Serbs for their rights in the Austro-Hungarian Empire and his play Gordana (1890) did not receive much praise.

== Translation of works in English ==
At the age of eighteen, in 1859, Kostić undertook the task of translating the works of William Shakespeare. Kostić researched and published works on Shakespeare for around 50 years.

The cultural ideals that motivated Kostić to translate Romeo and Juliet into Serbian were part of the Serbian literary revival that originated with Dositej Obradović in the eighteenth century. At the time, theatre emerged following the Serbian people's campaign for national independence in the late eighteenth century. During the 1850s and inter-war years, Kostić and his collaborator Andrejević made efforts to introduce Shakespeare to the Serbian public.

He tried to bring closer the Balkan cultures and the Antiquity, experimenting with the translation of Homer into the Serbian-epic decametre. He translated the works of many other foreign authors, notably Heinrich Heine, Heinrich Dernburg, Edward Bulwer-Lytton, 1st Baron Lytton's The Last Days of Pompeii, and Hungarian poet József Kiss.

All Serbian intellectuals of the period believed the existence of their country was bound to the fate of their native tongue, then spoken widely throughout the two foreign empires. This premise provided for Kostić's translation of Romeo and Juliet. The Serbian translation of Richard III was the joint effort of Kostić and his friend, the physician and author Jovan Andrejević-Joles. Andrejević also participated in the founding of Novi Sad's Serbian National Theatre in 1861. The year of the appearance of Richard III (1864) in Novi Sad coincided with the 300-year anniversary of Shakespeare's birth; for that occasion, Kostić adapted two scenes from Richard III using the iambic verse for the first time. Richard III was staged in Serbia and directed by Kostić himself. Later, he translated Hamlet but his work was met with criticism by notable literary critic Bogdan Popović.

Kostić's translation of the fourteenth stanza from Byron's Canto III of Don Juan expresses Byron's advice to the Greek insurgents:

Trust not for freedom to the Franks –
They have a king who buys and sells
In native swords, and native ranks
The only hope of courage dwells,
But Turkish force, and Latin Fraud
Would break your shield, however broad.

== Personality and private life ==
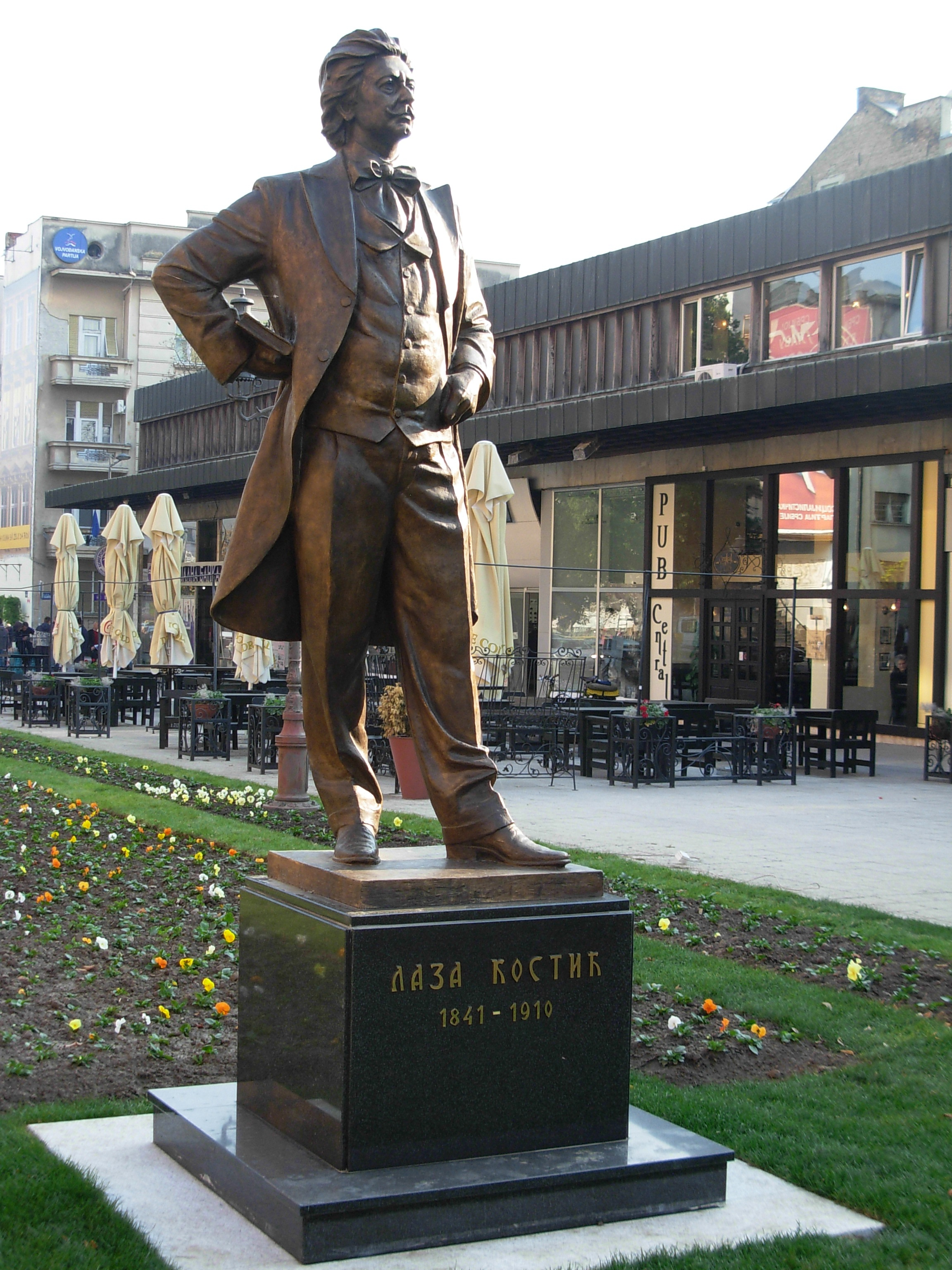
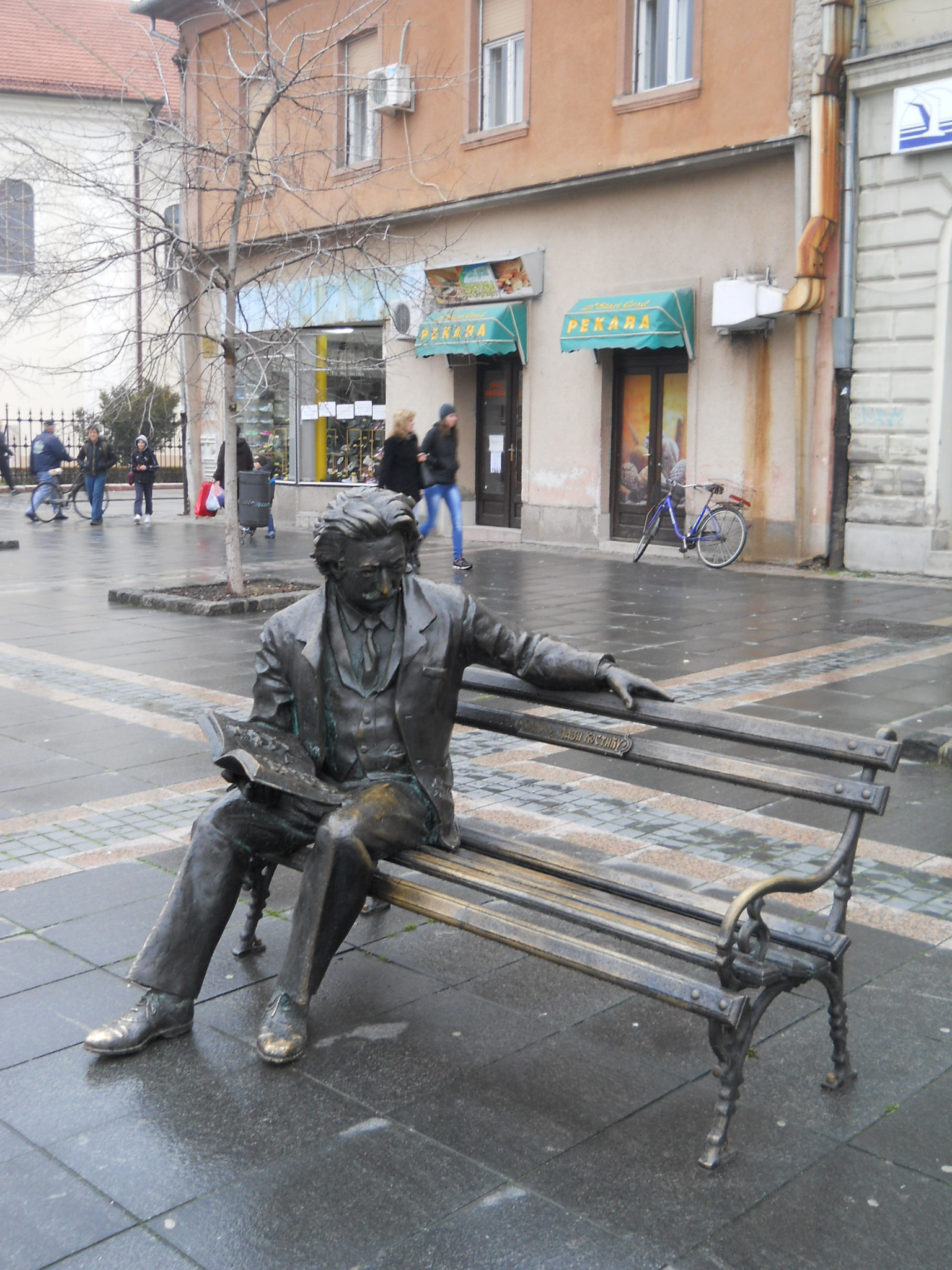
Left:Monument to Kostić in Novi Sad
Right: Monument in Sombor

Laza Kostić may be characterized as an eccentric but had a spark of genius. He was the first to introduce iambic meter into dramatic poetry and the first translator of Shakespeare into Serbian. At a European authors' convention at the turn of the 20th century he tried to explain the relationship between the culture of Serbia and those of major Western European cultures.

Kostić was friends with Lazar Dunđerski, the patriarch of one of the most important Serbian noble families in Austria-Hungary. He was in love with Jelena Lenka Dunđerski, Lazar's younger daughter, who was 29 years his junior. Although Lenka returned his love, Lazar Dunđerski did not approve of their relationship and would not allow them to marry. He arranged a marriage between Kostić and Juliana Palanački. Kostić attempted to arrange a marriage between Lenka and the Serbian-American scientist Nikola Tesla but Tesla rejected the offer.

Lenka died, probably from an infection, on her 25th birthday but some authors believe she committed suicide. After her death, Kostić wrote Santa Maria della Salute, one of his most important works and what is said to be one of the most beautiful love poems written in the Serbian language.

== Legacy ==
A major poet of Serbian Romanticism, Kostić linked the era of Romantic enthusiasm with the modern age of individualism.

Laza Kostić is included in The 100 most prominent Serbs.

Schools in Kovilj and New Belgrade are named after him.

== Selected works ==
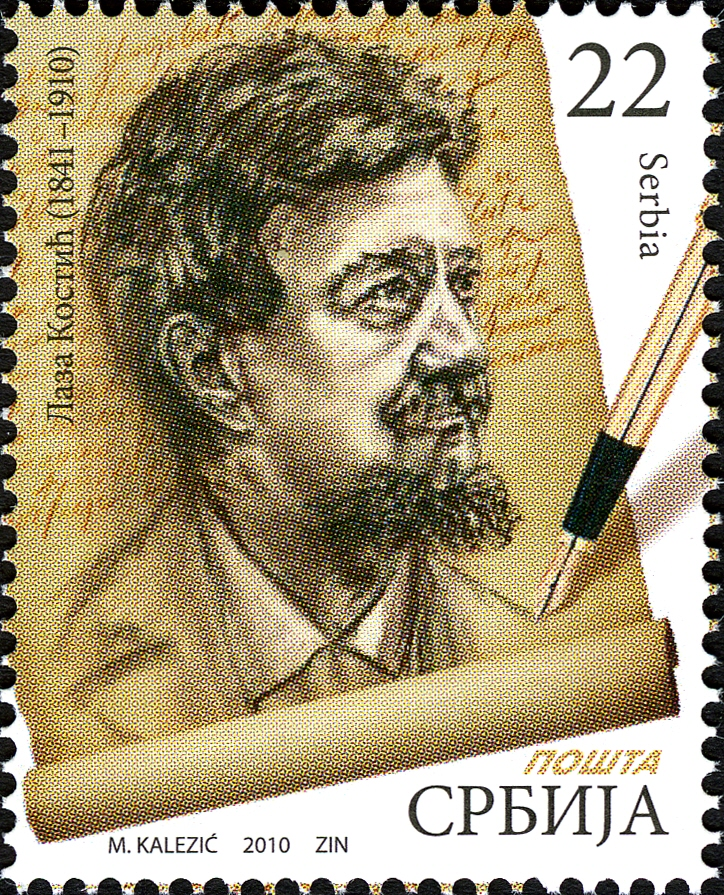
Laza Kostić on a 2010 Serbian stamp

- Maksim Crnojević, drama (1868)
- Pera Segedinac, drama (1882)
- Gordana, drama (1890)
- Osnova lepote u svetu s osobenim obzirom na srpske narodne pesme, (1880)
- Kritički uvod u opštu filosofiju, (1884)
- O Jovanu Jovanoviću Zmaju (Zmajovi), njegovom pevanju, mišljenju i pisanju, i njegovom dobu, (1902)
- Među javom i med snom, poem
- Santa Maria della Salute, poem
- Treće stanje duše, essay
- Čedo vilino, short story
- Maharadža, short story
- Mučenica, short story

Selected translations

- Richard III
- Hamlet
- Romeo and Juliet (1866)
- King Lear

== Sources ==
- Adapted from Serbian Wikipedia:Лаза Костић
- Translated and adapted from Jovan Skerlić's Istorija Nove Srpske Književnosti (Belgrade, 1914, 1921), pages 319–325
