= Golinjevo =

- Village
- Location within Bosnia and Herzegovina
- Coordinates: 43°42′N 17°01′E
- Country: Bosnia and Herzegovina
- Entity: Federation of Bosnia and Herzegovina
- Canton: Canton 10
- Township: Livno

Area
  - Total: 23.91 km^{2} (9.23 sq mi)

Population (2013)
  - Total: 718
  - Density: 30.0/km^{2} (77.8/sq mi)
- Time zone: UTC+1 (CET)
  - Summer (DST): UTC+2 (CEST)

Golinjevo is a village in the Township of Livno in Canton 10 of the Federation of Bosnia and Herzegovina, an entity of Bosnia and Herzegovina.

== Demographics ==
According to the 2013 census, its population was 718.

Ethnicity in 2013
Ethnicity	Number	Percentage
Croats	518	72.1%
Bosniaks	199	27.7%
Serbs	1	0.1%
Total	718	100%

== Bibliography ==
- Ethnicity/National Affiliation, Religion and Mother Tongue (PDF). Sarajevo: Agency for Statistics of Bosnia and Herzegovina. 2019. Archived from the original (PDF) on 2020-07-25.
