= Gliša Geršić =

Serbian politician, jurist, writer and professor

Gligorije (Gliša) Geršić (also Gliša Giga Geršić; 19 July 1842 – 1918) was a Serbian politician, jurist, writer and professor.

More of an academic than a politician, he was not associated with the more assertive group of noted Radicals. Although he was regarded as one of the leading intellectuals of the People's Radical Party, he was less prominent in its political leadership.

He was born in Bela Crkva where his family came from, then in southern Hungary, part of the Austrian Empire. He graduated from gymnasium and attended law schools in Budapest and Vienna before getting a teaching post at the Belgrade's Velika škola in 1866.

In politics, he first allied himself with the Liberals but later he switched sides and joined the founders of the People's Radical Party in 1881.

In 1883, professor Geršić was charged with conspiracy against the Crown (Timok Rebellion) and brought to trial where he was acquitted of all alleged charges. He served as the Minister of Justice in three different cabinets between 1888 and 1892. His contribution to the drafting of the 1888 Constitution carried weight since he was regarded as the prime authority in the field of constitutional law. He was twice elected to the Serbian State Senate (1889–1894 and 1901–1909).

He died in Belgrade, at the time in the Kingdom of Serbia.

== Works ==
it is said that late 19th- and early 20th-century Serbian legal philosophy and theory was shaped with the writings and lectures of Gligorije Giga Geršić. Also, Glišić is credited for being the first Serbian writer to translate Shakespeare's play "Richard III" in 1864.
