= Ilija Vukićević =

19th century Serbian writer

- Илија Вукићевић
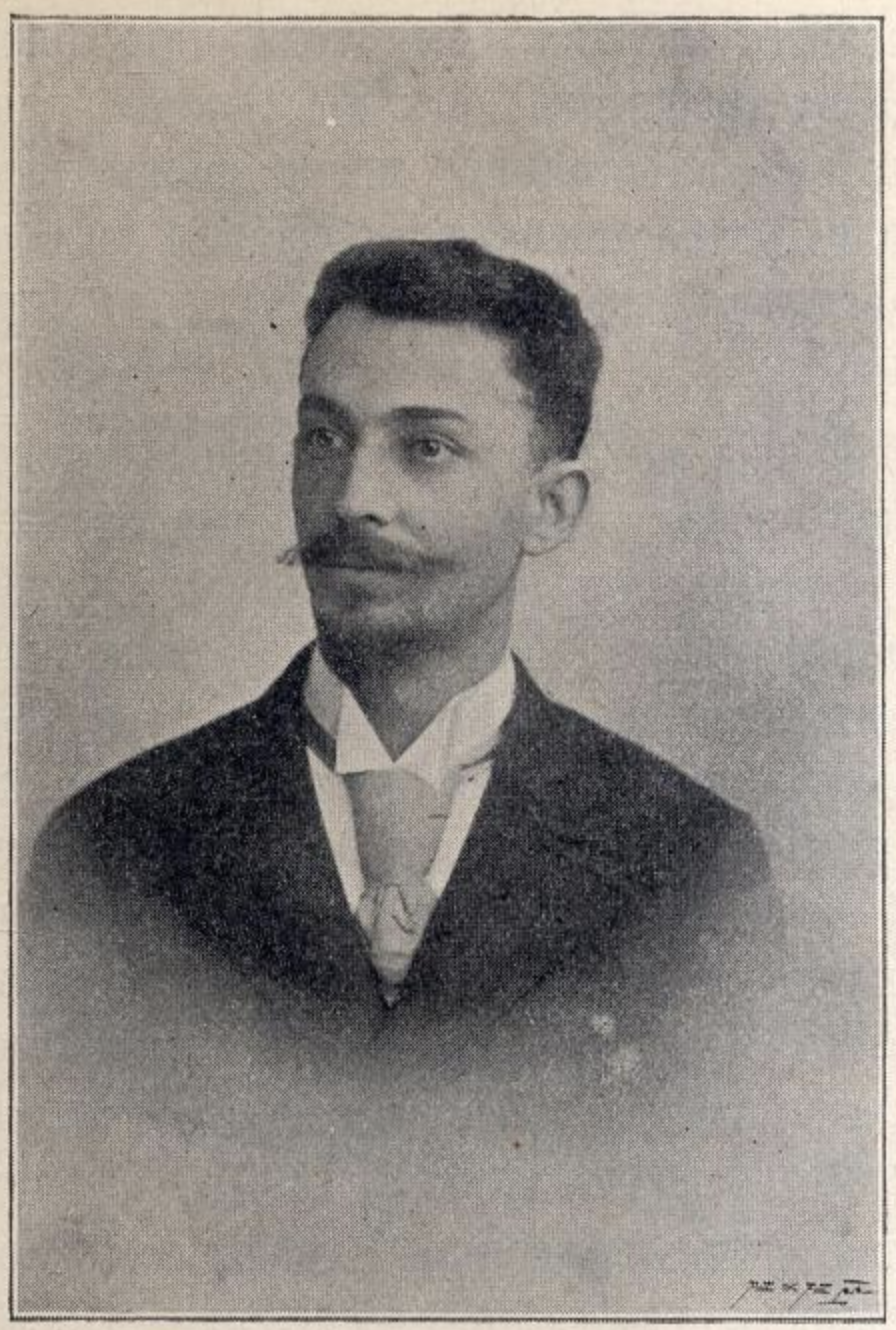
- Ilija Vukićević
- Born: 3 August 1866; Belgrade, Principality of Serbia
- Died: 5 March 1899 (aged 32); Belgrade, Kingdom of Serbia
- Education: Belgrade Higher School
- Occupations: Writer, Poet
- Spouse: Jovanka Čolak-Antić
- Writing career
- Language: Serbian
- Genre: Serbian realism

Ilija Vukićević (Serbian Cyrillic: Илија Вукићевић, 3 August 1866 – 5 March 1899) was a Serbian novelist, short story writer and playwright. During his lifetime he wrote 31 short stories, seven fairy tales and two plays. He is considered a representative of Serbian realism in the 1880s. Writing at first under the strong influence of Laza Lazarević, he later became closer to Turgenev and the Russian realist school of the time. He introduced several innovations into the narrative process. His collection of short stories is well known in Serbia, two books were published posthumously after his early death at the age of 32. His entire work was published in two volumes between the two world wars.

== Early life and education ==
Ilija Vukićević was born in Belgrade, to father Ivan Vukićević, a judge, and mother Sofia. He studied elementary and secondary school in various places around Serbia as his father, a civil servant, was often transferred. They lived in Valjevo, Smederevo, Jagodina, and for a long time in Šabac. Ilija finished primary school in Šabac, passed the secondary school graduation exam in Kragujevac, and then he went to Belgrade where he enrolled in the Department of Philosophy and School of Mathematics.

== Career ==
Vukićević started publishing his works as a student. The short story Patak (Duck) was printed on 17 May 1885 in "Beogradski dnevnik" (the Belgrade Diary), but without the author's signature. In the magazine "Stražilovo", which was edited by the writer Jovan Grčić Milenko, the short story Komšije (Neighbors) was published in 1887, that was the first work printed under Vukićević's real name. He completed his studies of natural sciences at the Belgrade Great School in 1888.

After graduation, he worked as a professor of French, geography and arithmetic. His first position was at the Vranje Gymnasium and it is assumed that he taught the great southerner Borislav Stanković. By 1890, he had written fifteen stories.

In the summer of 1890, he was appointed by Minister of Education Andra Nikolić, inspector of primary schools in Vranje and the Toplica district, areas that had just been liberated from the Ottoman Empire ten years earlier. On this tour he collected valuable material that would inspire the stories about people living on the Turkish border that made him famous. After his father's death, at his request, Vukićević was transferred back to Belgrade with his mother and brother. There, he was appointed professor at the Belgrade Secondary school. In 1890 he published a collection of short stories and one of his plays was performed at the Belgrade National Theater.

At the end of 1893, he became a member of the editorial board of the Belgrade Journal "Delo", a magazine for science, literature and social life, following French cultural and literary trends, committed to modernizing the young Serbian state by way of culture. During the year 1894 he stayed in Geneva, Switzerland, to study French language and literature at the expense of the State, during that period he sent contributions to "Delo", "Bosanska vila" and others. In his stories, realism begins to mix with fiction, folk tales, allegory and satire. His literary influence was exerted by Laza Lazarević, under whose influence Ilija Vukićević depicted village and provincial life as well as events on the border, he was also influenced by Milovan Glišić and Janko Veselinović. In addition to fairy tales, Ilija Vukićević wrote several short stories, in which he deepens the analysis of the personality of his characters, dwelling on the presentation of its unusual external physiognomy, searching for external aspects of mental disorders.

With Vukićević, realism was mixed with fiction, grotesque, folk tales, allegory and satire. Naturalistic motives, injustices, hallucinations, dreams, distortions in family relations, psychological disorders and similar topics are announced by future Serbian realists: Simo Matavulj, Ivo Ćipiko, Borislav Stanković and Radoje Domanović. Upon his return to Belgrade, Ilija Vukićević fell ill with a severe nervous disorder and died in 1899 at the age of 32.

== Bibliography ==
During his short lifetime, Vukićević wrote 31 short stories, seven fairy tales and two plays.

=== Short stories ===
- Patak (Патак); English translation: Duck
- Komšije (Комшије); English translation: Neighbors
- Sve sam znaš (Све сам знаш); English translation: You know everything yourself
- Jemac (Јемац); English translation: Jemac
- Prvo unuče (Прво унуче); English translation: First grandchild
- Pod bagrenom (Под багреном); English translation: Pod bagrenom
- Svoj greh (Свој грех); English translation: My sin
- Kad nije suđeno (Кад није суђено); English translation: "When it is not judged
- Najbolji lov (Најбољи лов); English translation: The best hunt
- Je li živ? (Је ли жив?); English translation: Is he alive?
- Dva rastanka (Два растанка); English translation: Two goodbyes
- Podsvojče (Подсвојче); English translation: Podsvojče
- Nad grotlom (Над гротлом); English translation: Over the hatch
- Zlatna žica (Златна жица); English translation: Golden Wire
- U novoj kući (У новој кући); English translation: In a new house
- Na mesečini (На месечини); English translation: In the moonlight
- Graničari (Граничари); English translation: Border guards
- Nekoliko slika iz života jednoga junaka (Неколико слика из живота једнога јунака); English translation: Several pictures from the life of one hero
- Pod suncem (Под сунцем); English translation: Under the sun
- Škrbo i Fejzula (Шкрбо и Фејзула); English translation: Škrbo and Fejzula
- Mala pogreška (Мала погрешка); English translation: Small mistake
- Na straži (На стражи); English translation: On guard
- Stika (Стика); English translation: Contact
- Miško ubojica (Мишко убојица); English translation: Killer mouse
- Iskušenje (Искушење); English translation: Temptation
- Gorak hleb (Горак хлеб); English translation: Bitter bread
- Roždestvo tvoje (Рождество твоје); English translation: Your Christmas
- Priča o selu Vračima i Simi Stupici (Прича о селу Врачима и Сими Ступици); English translation: The story of the village of Vrači and Sima Stupica
- Jedan borac (Један борац); English translation: One fighter
- Kako je Nastas nalbantin tražio i našao sreću (Како је Настас налбантин тражио и нашао срећу); English translation: How Nastas Nalbantin sought and found happiness
- Ljuta rana (Љута рана); English translation: Angry Wound

=== Fairy tales ===
- Strašan san (Страшан сан); English translation: Awesome dream
- Lekovit štap (Лековит штап); English translation: Healing stick
- Mala vila (Мала вила); English translation: Little villa
- Prokleta lepota (Проклета лепота); English translation: Damn beauty
- Đavo i devojka (Ђаво и девојка); English translation: The Devil and the Girl
- Car Goran (Цар Горан); English translation: Tsar Goran
- Srce (Срце); English translation: Heart

=== Plays ===
- Sreća i ljudi (Срећа и људи); English translation: Happiness and people
- epa bula (Лепа була); English translation: Beautiful bull

== Personal life ==
In 1895 Ilija Vukićević married Jovanka Čolak-Antić, daughter of Ilija Čolak-Antić, descendant of Vojvoda Čolak-Anta Simeonović, sister of General Vojin Čolak-Antić and of Marshall of the Court Boško Čolak-Antić. Ilija and Jovanka had a son named Ivan.

== Sources ==
- Bataković, D.T. (2010). La Serbie et la France - une alliance atypique: 1870-1940 (in French). Académie serbe des arts et sciences. ISBN 978-86-7179-061-1.
- Deretić, J. (1987). A short history of Serbian literature (in Serbian). Beogradski izdavačko-grafički zavod. ISBN 978-86-13-00060-0.
- "Fairy-tale realist Ilija Vukicevic". Politikin Zabavnik (in Serbian).
- Ravbar, M. (1958). Review of Croatian, Serbian and Macedonian literature (in Serbian). Založba Obzorja.
- Vučković, R. (1990). Modern Serbian prose: From the end of the 19th antod the beginning of the 20th century (in Serbian). Prosveta. ISBN 978-86-07-00473-7.
- Vukićević, I. (2015). The most beautiful stories of Ilija Vukićević (in Serbian). Independent Publishing Platform. ISBN 978-1-5147-2405-7.
