= Vojin Čolak-Antić =

Serbian senior officer

General Vojin Čolak-Antić
- Војин Чолак-Антић
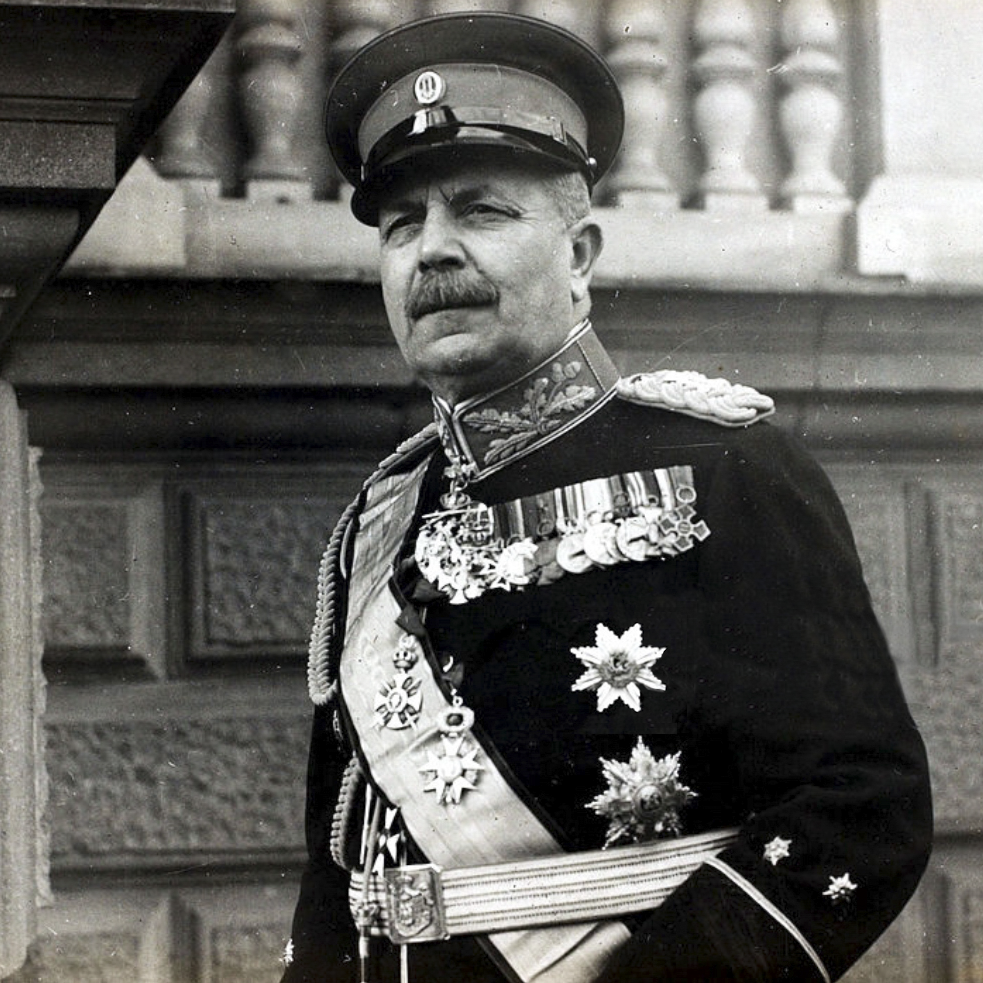
- General Vojin Tcholak-Antitch
- Born: August 4, 1877; Kragujevac, Principality of Serbia
- Died: July 29, 1945 (aged 67); Belgrade, Yugoslavia
- Burial place: Novo Groblje, Belgrade
- Other name: Voyin Tcholak-Antitch
- Relatives: Boško Čolak-Antić (brother); Ilija Čolak-Antić (father)
- Military career
- Allegiance: Kingdom of Serbia; Kingdom of Yugoslavia
- Branch: Royal Serbian Army; Royal Yugoslav Army
- Service years: 1898–1936
- Rank: Divisional General
- Commands: 2nd Cavalry Division; 2nd Cavalry Brigade; 1st Volunteer Division; 2nd Cavalry Regiment
- Conflicts: First Balkan War; Second Balkan War; First World War
- Awards: Order of Karađorđe's Star (2); Order of White Eagle (2); Order of St. Sava; Bravery Medal (2); Legion of Honour (France)

Vojin I. Čolak-Antić (Serbian: Војин Чолак-Антић; 4 August 1877 – 29 July 1945), also spelled Voyin Tcholak-Antitch, was a Serbian senior army officer in the Royal Serbian Army and the Royal Yugoslav Army who held a number of senior commands, staff and diplomatic functions.

Born into a prominent Serbian family with a long military history, Čolak-Antić attended the Royal Military Academy before training as a staff officer in France. He saw action during both Balkan Wars and the First World War where he served with distinction as a cavalry officer. After the retreat through Albania and the transfer to Corfu, he was appointed head of the Operation Division of the Supreme Command overseeing the 1st Serbian Volunteer Corps in Odessa. After the reorganisation of the Serbian Army and its redeployment along Greece’s northern border, he received command of the 2nd Cavalry Brigade during the Franco-Serb offensive of 1918, and the subsequent capitulation of Bulgaria leading to the liberation of Serbia. In the post-war period he was sent to the Paris Peace Conference, as representative of the new Kingdom of Serbs, Croats and Slovenes to the Border Commission. In August 1921 he was appointed Governor General of the occupied Hungarian area of Pécs and Baranya. he later became Military Attaché in Bucharest before receiving command of the newly formed 2nd Cavalry Division of the Royal Yugoslav Army.

Among his many decorations Čolak-Antić was awarded the French Legion of Honour for his service during the war. He later served as Inspector-General of Cavalry and as Aide-de-camp to the young King Peter II Karageorgevic from 1935 to 1939. He died in Belgrade in 1945.

== Early life and education ==
Čolak-Antić was born on 4 August 1877 at his family's home in Kragujevac, the former capital of the Principality of Serbia. As direct descendants of Vojvoda Čolak-Anta Simeonović, one of the leaders of the First Serbian Uprising of 1804, the Čolak-Antić family was among the most prominent noble military family. His mother, Jelena (née Matić) was a daughter of Minister Dimitrije Matić, the liberal politician and philosopher who had been Minister of Foreign Affairs, Minister of Education, and Minister of Justice. At the time of Čolak-Antić birth, his father, Colonel Ilija Čolak-Antić, was commander of the Ibar Army during the Serbo Turkish War, the successful war of independence from Ottoman rule, a year later his maternal grandfather, Dimitrije Matić, was elected president of the National Assembly of Serbia, which ratified the provisions of the Treaty of Berlin proclaiming Serbia's independence. His father became military attaché in Vienna, at the time Serbia's main economic partner. Čolak-Antić had a sister Jovanka married to writer Ilija Vukićević and an older brother, Boško, born in 1871 who became a diplomat and a Marshall of the Court.

Čolak-Antić was educated at Užice, in western Serbia, as his father prepared him for a military career, he was admitted at the military academy in Belgrade, where his father had taught. He was accepted as an officer cadet in the cavalry. His father died in December 1894, Čolak-Antić graduated from the military academy four years later in 1898.

== Career ==
Upon graduation from the Military Academy, as a top graduate, he was posted to the Royal Serbian Guard, he entered the squadron unit with the rank of sergeant. Even though the conspiracy originated within this elite unit, there is no evidence that he was involved in the plot to assassinate the Royal couple during the May Coup of June 1903. That same year he was commissioned as Lieutenant of Cavalry and accepted to the senior staff college of the Royal military Academy. During the coronation of Peter I of Serbia, he was part of the Honour Guard protecting the sovereign and was selected to lead the King's horse. On 7 November 1904, Čolak-Antić was appointed to his first command, the First Squadron of the 4th Cavalry Regiment. He continued the General Staff training in the Operation Division of the Supreme Command from 1906 to 1909. In 1909, he was promoted to the rank of Major of Cavalry.

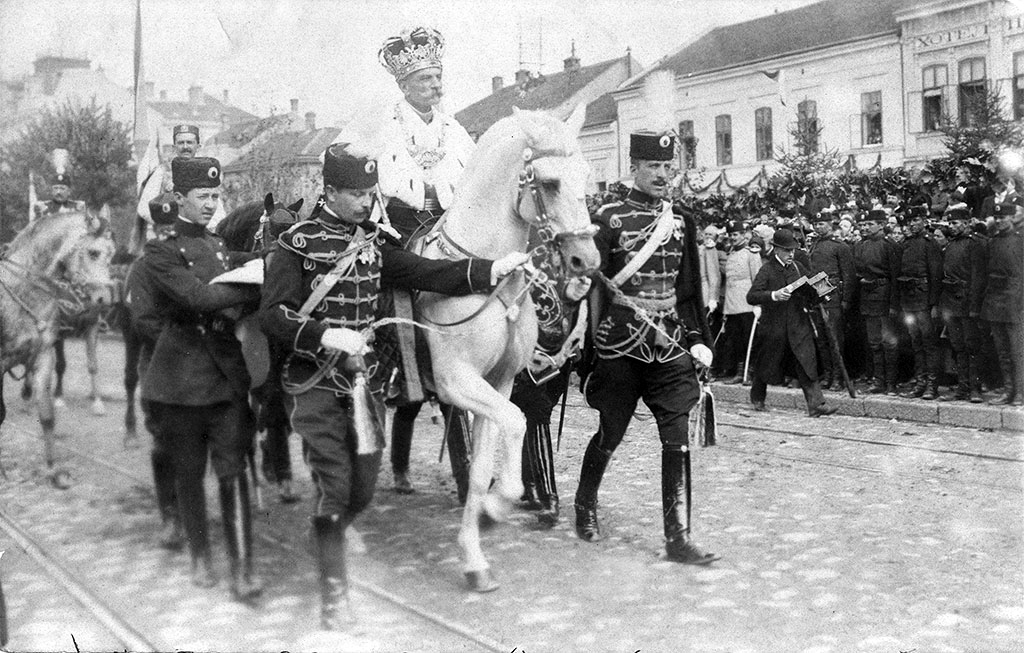
Vojin Čolak-Antić (forefront) as part of the Honour Guard, leading King Peter I Coronation's procession on 21 September 1904

On 31 March 1910, as a Military Cadet, Čolak-Antić was sent for further training in France, at the 23rd Dragoon Regiment, the famed Royal Piémont with the rank of Captain First-Class. Upon his return to Serbia, he was commissioned cavalry major in the General Staff of the Ministry of War. Čolak-Antić was transferred on 15 October 1911 to the 4th Cavalry Regiment. On 4 April 1912, at the end of his staff training, he was appointed deputy assistant adjutant-general to the Danube Divisional Area, one of the divisional regions of the Serbian Army (alongside the Drina, Morava, Šumadija, and Timok areas) based on the corresponding geographic region.

When the Balkan Wars broke out in October 1912, Čolak-Antić became commander of the 2nd Cavalry Regiment Car Dušan. Following the war, he was awarded the Medal for Bravery and promoted on 31 October 1913 to the rank of lieutenant colonel for distinguished service in the field.

Upon the outbreak of the First World War, Čolak-Antić fought with success commanding the 2nd Cavalry Regiment during the repulsed Austro-Hungarian invasions. In the fall of 1915, commanding the same regiment, he joined the retreat through Albania. During the Serbian army and government exile in Corfu, while the country was occupied by Austria-Hungary and Bulgaria, Čolak-Antić was appointed to the Operational Division of the Supreme Command and promoted colonel. In April of 1916, he was transferred to the Russian Empire at the headquarters of the 1st Volunteer Division in Odessa, where the first Yugoslav army unit was being organised; he remained there until the October Revolution of 1917 when the withdrawal was ordered. After returning to the Salonika front from Russia, he was appointed commander of the 2nd Cavalry Brigade during the successful 1918 offensive that liberated the country.

== Postwar ==
In 1918, while still commander of the 2nd Cavalry Brigade, he was appointed commander of military occupied Baranja, based in Pecs. After the collapse of the Hungarian Soviet Republic in December 1918, he allowed the transfer of communist miners to the territory of Baranja, he was briefly removed from his position but was reinstalled on 30 December 1919. As part of the Yugoslav delegation Čolak-Antić was sent to the Paris Peace Conference of 1919. Following the demise of the Austro-Hungarian Empire, the question of the delimitation between Hungary and its neighbouring countries was the subject of intensive talks, in 1920, the Treaty of Trianon ratified the decision to re-draw Hungary's borders. By the Treaty's conclusions, Hungary ceded western Banat, Bačka, Međimurje, and Prekmurje to the Kingdom of Serbs, Croats and Slovene. The region of Baranja, with its administrative seat of government in the town of Pécs, was divided with the southern part annexed to the Kingdom of SCS according to a new boundary line, the so-called Clemenceau line.

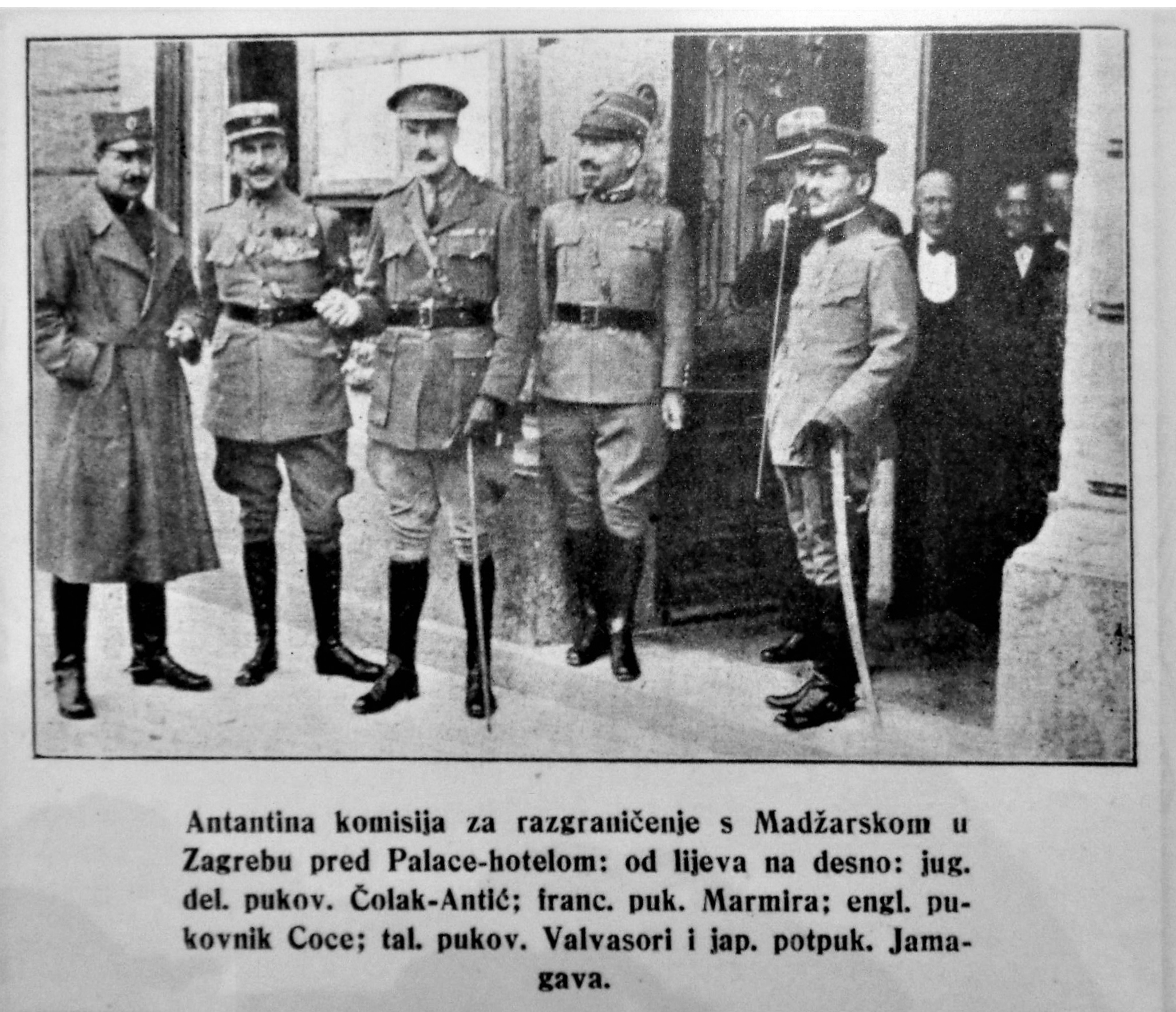
Colonel Vojin Čolak-Antić (first from left) and the members of the Yugoslav-Hungarian Boundary Commission. Zagreb c.1921

On 1 August 1921, Colonel Vojin Čolak-Antić was appointed commissioner of the Yugoslav-Hungarian Boundary Commission. The body tasked with defining a definitive delimitation between the two States. The commission work involved studies from lawyers, historians, geographers and other members of the academic community, in order to prepare border documentation, on the basis of Article 29 of the Peace Treaty. The British delegate LL Col. Cree was appointed as its chairman, the other members were Col. Luigi Valvassori (Italy), Lt Col. Marminia (France), Lt Col. Yanagawa (Japan) while Col. Vassel and Col. Vojin Colak-Antic represented respectively Hungary and the Kingdom of the Serbs, Croats and Slovenes. The city of Varaždin was chosen as the seat of the border commission, a further meeting was organised for 18 August 1921.

The occupation of Pécs and Baranya by Yugoslav troops following the cessation of hostilities in November 1918, provoked some resistance from workers who wanted to be connected to revolutionary events taking place at the time in Hungary. After the collapse of the communist uprising in Hungary, in August 1919, a large number of emigrants took shelter in Pécs where mayor Béla Linder gave them shelter and the Yugoslav army protected them. The workers, reinforced by the sudden influx, took over the administration of the city, along with the civilian forces. On 5 August 1921, the Conference of Ambassadors gave instructions for the Yugoslav withdrawal of southern Hungary and asked the Yugoslav government to appoint an officer through whom the local Allied Commission might communicate with Belgrade; Colonel Čolak-Antić was appointed Military Commander of Pécs and Baranja during the transitional period; amongst his duties was the handover of the civilian government in Pécs to the Hungarian authorities. The Yugoslav army started to evacuate Pécs and Baranja in mid-August.

Elections were held and on 19 August 1921, while the withdrawal was taking place, the civil authorities in southern Hungary proclaimed the so-called Serbian-Hungarian Republic of Baranya-Baja with the painter Petar Dobrović as its elected president. Due to the new political situation, Colonel Vojin Čolak-Antić decided to halt the evacuation of the region. The small Republic of Baranya did not manage to gain international recognition and since it depended on the Serbian protection, when the Yugoslav army finally withdrew, Hungarian forces of Miklós Horthy entered into the region bringing it to an end.

On 24 September 1921, Čolak-Antić was appointed commander of the 2nd Cavalry Division. In July 1922, he took part again in the Geneva negotiations as Yugoslav Border Commissioner later joined by Foreign Minister Momčilo Ninčić, and in November 1922, the six members of the Border Commission signed the border list. According to historians, the definition of the Hungarian-Yugoslav border was undeniably a major reason for the stabilisation of Europe after the First World War and the establishment of a new regional balance.

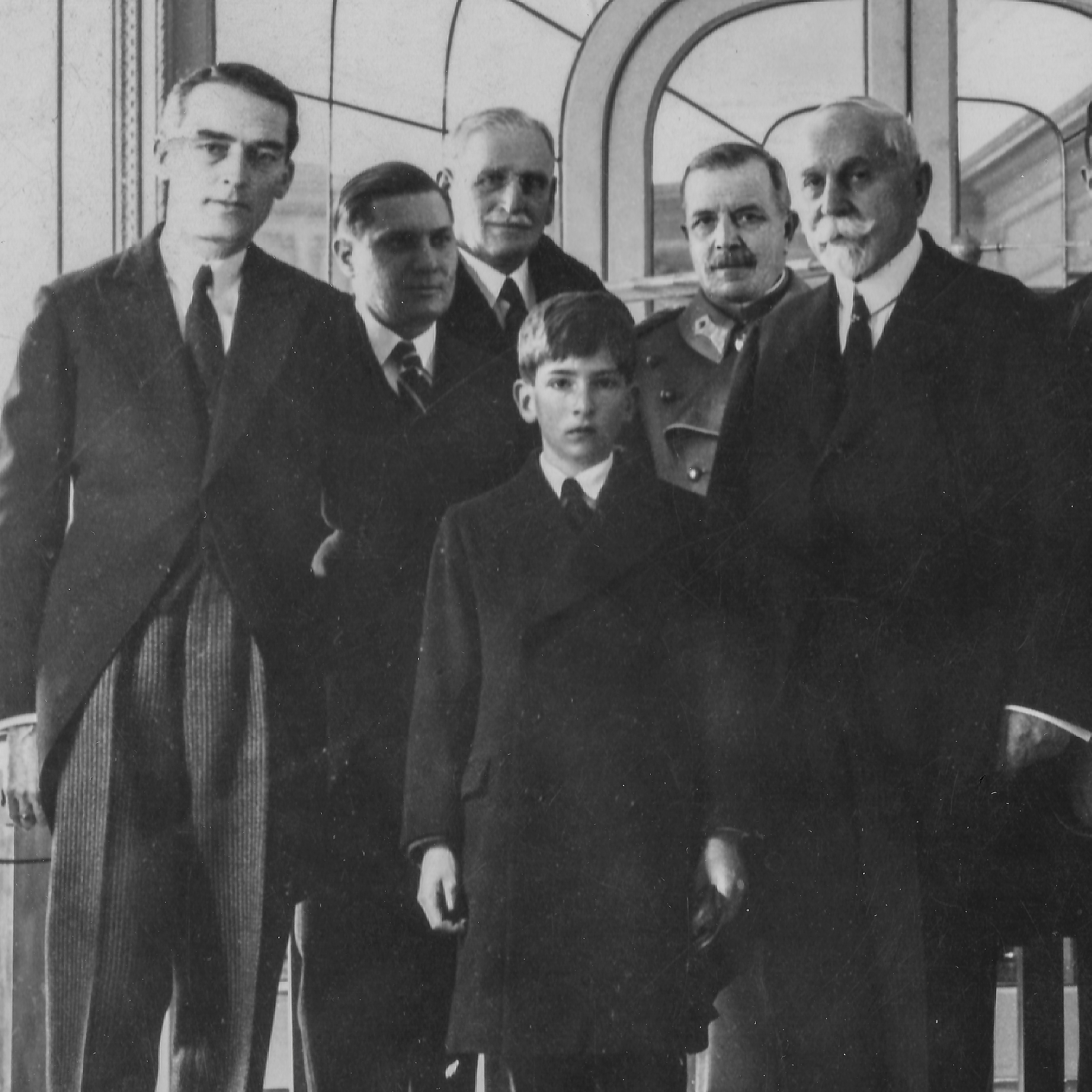
General Vojin Čolak-Antić (second from right) as Aide-De-Camp to the young King Peter II of Yugoslavia c.1935

On 18 July 1923, Čolak-Antić was appointed military envoy in Bucharest and promoted to the rank of brigadier general on 21 October of the same year. He stayed in the Kingdom of Romania until the end of his term on 25 January 1927. On his return, he became acting commander of the 2nd Cavalry Division and was promoted to the rank of divisional general. He became Inspector General of Cavalry on 11 April 1929, a position he would keep until the end of his career, on 5 December 1929 he was awarded the French Legion of Honour with the rank of Commandeur. In 1930 he appeared in the documentary film “For the Honour of the Fatherland” an account of the Serbian retreat during the First World War directed by Stanislav Krakov. On 13 January 1935, he was appointed Aide-de-camp to the young King Peter II Karadjordjevic. In 1936, he represented the Kingdom of Yugoslavia at the funeral of King George V in London.

== Retirement and death ==
Vojin Čolak-Antić retired as a divisional general in the Royal Yugoslav Army in 1936. Upon the invasion of the country by the Axis forces in April 1941, he was handed over the war plan, the operational protocol and other sensitive material by his son Lieutenant colonel Petar Čolak-Antić, documents that he hid from the invaders. During the Nazi military occupation of Serbia, when those caught aiding Jews were punishable with the execution of entire families, Čolak-Antić arranged the escape out of the country of a Jewish doctor that he hid in the family home, less than 2 kilometres (1.2 mi) from the Banjica concentration camp, and petitioned the Germans for the release of Avram Berahi and his wife before they could be deported, both survived the war as a result. Čolak-Antić died on 29 July 1945 a few months after Belgrade was liberated, Germany surrendered and the Communist Partisans took control of the country, he is buried in Belgrade New Cemetery.

== Marriage and family ==
Vojin Čolak-Antić married in 1904 Marija Grujić, daughter of Prime Minister Sava Grujić, and descendant of Vojvoda Vule Ilić Kolarac. The couple had one daughter, Simonida, and three sons who all became officers of the Royal Yugoslav army:

- Major Ilija Čolak-Antić (1905–1974),
- Major Grujica Čolak-Antić (1906–1967)
- Lieutenant Colonel Peter Čolak-Antić (1907–1964)
