= Slavko Grujić =

Serbian politician and Diplomat

KBE Slavko Grujić
- Славко Ј. Грујић
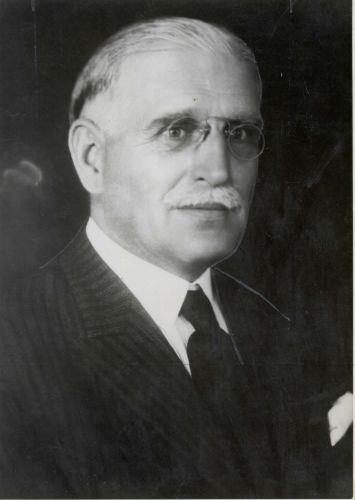
- Slavko J. Grujić c. 1930

Personal details
- Born: 15 February 1871 Belgrade, Principality of Serbia
- Died: 24 March 1937 (aged 66) London, United Kingdom
- Spouse: Mabel Grujić
- Parent: Jevrem Grujić (father)
- Education: Sorbonne University (PhD, 1897)
- Occupation: Diplomat

Slavko J. Grujić KBE (Serbian Cyrillic: Славко Ј. Грујић; 15 February 1871 – 24 March 1937) was a Serbian diplomat, marshal of the court, and philanthropist. A skilled diplomat he was one of the main contributors of the response to the Austrian ultimatum of 23 July 1914, which some scholars have called "a masterpiece of diplomatic equivocation". After the First World War, he became Yugoslavia's first ambassador to the United States returning to serve as Marshal of the Court to King Peter II of Yugoslavia. He died in London, while serving as ambassador of Yugoslavia to the United Kingdom, in 1937.

== Early life ==
Slavko Grujić (Note: Often anglicized in official documents as Grouitch) was born in Belgrade, Principality of Serbia. He was the fourth son, of eight children, to Serbian statesman and diplomat Jevrem Grujić, his father was a central figure of the St Andrew's Day Assembly and the instigator of Serbia's first law on the National Assembly. Slavko Grujić finished high school in Marseille, France, before studying at the Sorbonne University in Paris, where he received his Doctor of Law degree (doctorat en droit) in 1897. He began his diplomatic career as a clerk in the Ministry of Foreign Affairs of the Kingdom of Serbia in January 1898.

== Career ==
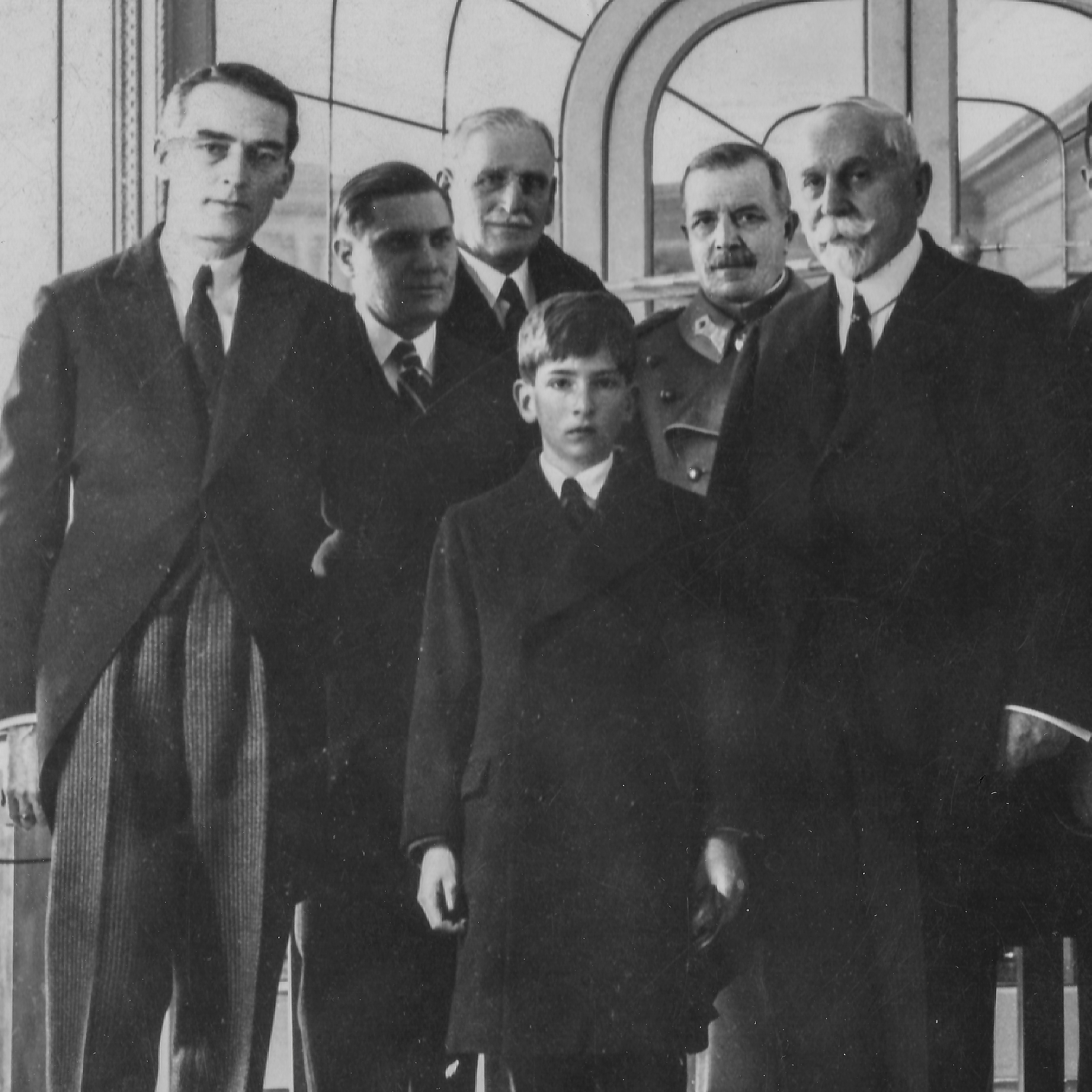
Marshall of the Court Slavko Grujić (third from left) behind young King Peter II of Yugoslavia, Tadija Sondermajer (first from left), Aide-De-Camp General Vojin Čolak-Antić (second from right) c.1935

Grujić was sent as attaché to Serbia's embassy in Constantinople, then to Athens as Chargé d'affaires. A few years later Grujić was sent to represent the Serbian Kingdom in Petrograd.

In early October 1908, during the Bosnian Crisis, he was Chargé d'affaires in London, when the Dual Monarchy of Austria-Hungary announced the annexation of Bosnia and Herzegovina. One of Grujić's proposals, attached to the protest of the Serbian government, was the concession of a railway to the Adriatic coast, and on the Bosnian side, a revision of the Serbian frontier.

On the eve of the First World War, Grujić was Secretary-General of the Serbian Ministry of Foreign Affairs, and on 30 June met with the Austro-Hungarian secretary of the Habsburg legation in Belgrade, Wilhelm Ritter von Storck, to discuss the Sarajevo assassinations. On 23 July 1914, in the absence of Nikola Pašić, Grujić and acting prime minister Lazar Paču receive from Austrian minister Baron Wladimir Giesl von Gieslingen the ultimatum of Austria-Hungary, Slavko Grujić was one of the main contributors of the reply to the Austrian note. According to Christopher Clark, professor of History at the University of Cambridge, the Serbian reply was "a masterpiece of diplomatic equivocation". Baron Alexander von Musulin, Austria's special envoy, who had written the first draft of the ultimatum, described it as "the most brilliant specimen of diplomatic skill" that he had ever encountered.

After the great retreat, Slavko Grujić organised the transfer of refugees from the Albanian coast to Corfu and France. As one of the closest collaborators of Prime Minister Nikola Pašić, at the start of January 1916, Grujić was sent to Brindisi as the "Serbian delegate for refugees". In Brindisi, he met with the commanders of the Italian navy to convince them to send ships to Medua. More than 5,000 refugees were evacuated safely including 700 schoolchildren sent to Marseille.

In 1916 he became the first Serbian Ambassador to Switzerland where together with Mable he actively organised humanitarian help to occupied Serbia with the International Committee of the Red Cross in Geneva. On 13 January 1919, Slavko Grujić became the first ambassador of the Kingdom of Serbs, Croats and Slovenes (later the Kingdom of "Yugoslavia") in Washington, a position he held until 1922. On 10 February 1919, Acting Secretary of State Frank Polk wrote to Ambassador to the United States Slavko Grujić that the United States Government recognized that the Serbian Legation will thereafter be known as the Legation for the Kingdom of the Serbs, Croats, and Slovenes.

Serbia emerged with renewed vitality, stronger than ever, because of the realization of the aspirations of all the Yugoslavs to be united into one Kingdom. The allied victories of 1918 in which Serbia, as the whole world knows, played an important military role, resulted in the liberation of the Serbs, Croats, and Slovenes whom Austria had held for a century under her cruel yoke. Serbia lived, but Austria-Hungary, who had meant to strike a death blow at her small neighbor, collapsed.

— Slavko Grujić, Yugoslavia's ambassador to the United States. 1919

Upon his return to the country, Grujić actively participated in the work of various humanitarian societies. In 1934, after the death of King Alexander I, he became marshal of the court of the young King Peter II of Yugoslavia. In 1935, Grujić was appointed Envoy Extraordinary and Minister Plenipotentiary at the Court of St. James, i.e. Ambassador to the United Kingdom, and at the same time to the Netherlands. He died in London of heart failure on 24 March 1937.

== Personal life ==
In 1901, at a ball at the American embassy in Athens, he met his future wife, 21-year-old American archeologist, Mabel Dunlop, they married and returned to Belgrade where he became secretary to the Serbian Cabinet. During the Great War, Mabel organised fundraisings in America for Serbia crossing the ocean more than twenty times by steamer, she founded the Serbian Hospital Fund and a baby hospital in Niš. After the war, Mabel and Slavko Grujić managed to receive $100,000 from the Carnegie Foundation in 1920, to build the University Library Svetozar Marković. According to Barbara Tuchman, Mable Grujić was also recruiting agents for the British Naval Intelligence during the first and second world war.

== See also ==
- Marshal of the Court (Serbia, Yugoslavia)
- List of honorary British knights and dames

== Notes ==
Diplomatic posts
Preceded by Office created	Kingdom of Yugoslavia Ambassador to the United States; 1919–1922	Succeeded by Unknown
Preceded by Unknown	Kingdom of Yugoslavia Ambassador to the Netherlands; 1935–1937	Succeeded by Unknown
Preceded by Unknown	Kingdom of Yugoslavia Ambassador to the United Kingdom; 1935–1937	Succeeded by Unknown
Court offices
Preceded by Aleksandar Dimitrijević	Marshal of the Royal Court of Yugoslavia; 1934–1935	Succeeded by Boško Čolak-Antić
