= Boško Čolak-Antić =

Serbian diplomat and court official (1871–1949)

- Бошко Чолак-Антић
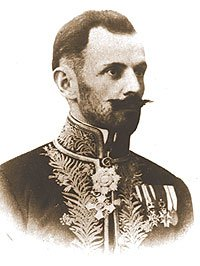
- Boško I. Čolak-Antić c. 1903

Marshal of the Royal Court of Yugoslavia
- In office 1935–1941
- Monarch: Peter II of Yugoslavia
- Preceded by: Slavko Grujić
- Succeeded by: Position abolished

Yugoslav Ambassador to Romania
- In office 9 December 1920 – March 1935
- Monarch: Alexander I of Yugoslavia
- Preceded by: Djordje Nastasijević
- Succeeded by: Jovan Dučić

Yugoslav Ambassador to Sweden
- In office 18 February 1918 – 8 December 1920
- Monarch: Peter I of Serbia
- Preceded by: Milan Rakić
- Succeeded by: Milorad Stražnjicki

Marshal of the Royal Court of Serbia
- In office 1915–1917
- Succeeded by: Petar Živković

Serbian Ambassador to Bulgaria
- In office 1913–1915
- Monarch: Peter I of Serbia
- Preceded by: Miroslav Spalajković
- Succeeded by: Milan Tucaković

Serbian Ambassador to Egypt
- In office 1908–1912
- Monarch: Peter I of Serbia
- Preceded by: Position established
- Succeeded by: Miloš M. Bogićević

Marshal of the Royal Court of Serbia
- In office 1904–1908
- Monarch: Peter I of Serbia

Personal details
- Born: 21 August 1871 Kragujevac, principality of Serbia
- Died: March 24, 1949 (aged 77) Belgrade, Yugoslavia
- Relations: Čolak-Anta Simeonović
- Parent: Ilija Čolak-Antić (father)
- Relatives: Vojin Čolak-Antić (brother)
- Education: University of Geneva (PhD, 1894)
- Occupation: Diplomat

Boško I. Čolak-Antić (Serbian Cyrillic: Бошко Чолак-Антић; 21 August 1871 – 24 March 1949), also known as Boshko Tcholak-Antitch, was a Serbian and Yugoslav diplomat and court official who served as an ambassador and Marshal of the Court for both the Kingdom of Serbia and the Kingdom of Yugoslavia. Born into a family with a long-standing military tradition, Čolak-Antić was the great-grandson of Vojvoda Čolak-Anta Simeonović, a leader in the First Serbian Uprising against the Ottoman Empire. Throughout his career, Čolak-Antić played an important role in Serbian and Yugoslav diplomatic affairs in the late 19th and early 20th centuries, contributing to the development of the region's foreign relations.

After earning a doctorate in law from the University of Geneva, Čolak-Antić entered diplomatic service in 1898, marking the beginning of a career that would see him occupy several key roles in Serbian and later Yugoslav foreign relations. He served as Minister Plenipotentiary to Bulgaria and Consul in Egypt, where he advanced Serbia’s interests during a time of regional tension. During World War I, Čolak-Antić played an essential role in diplomatic efforts, notably in negotiations to align Bulgaria with the Allies. Following the invasion of Serbia, he joined the Serbian government in exile on Corfu. In the post-war years, Čolak-Antić continued his service as ambassador to Sweden and Romania, where he contributed to the formation of the Little Entente and the strengthening of Yugoslavia's diplomatic ties within Europe.

Appointed Marshal of the Royal Court for King Peter I and later for King Peter II during the Regency, Čolak-Antić served during critical periods including the interwar years and the onset of World War II. Known for his diplomatic acumen and close association with the Karađorđević dynasty, he remained influential in Yugoslav diplomacy until his retirement in 1939. His brother, General Vojin Čolak-Antić, was a notable cavalry officer and military attaché.

== Early life and family ==
Boško I Čolak-Antić was born on 21 August 1871 in Kragujevac, then part of the Principality of Serbia, into the Čolak-Antić family, known for its historical contributions to Serbia’s military. The family traced its lineage back to Vojvoda Čolak-Anta Simeonović, a notable leader of the First Serbian Uprising against the Ottoman Empire. Čolak-Antić was the eldest son of Colonel Ilija Čolak-Antić, commander of the Serbian Ibar Army during the Serbo-Turkish war, and Jelena (née Matić). His maternal grandfather was Dimitrije Matić, a prominent Liberal politician and philosopher who served as a minister and was president of the National Assembly when Serbia gained independence from the Ottoman Empire. Čolak-Antić had a younger brother, Vojin Čolak-Antić, who became a Yugoslav general, and a sister, Jovanka, who married the writer Ilija Vukićević.

After completing his secondary education and graduating from the Belgrade Velika škola and the Faculty of Law, he pursued legal studies at the University of Geneva, where he earned his doctorate in law in 1894. Upon returning to Serbia, he began his career at the Ministry of Finance before transferring to the Ministry of Foreign Affairs in 1898, joining the diplomatic service in December of that year.

== Diplomatic and Court career ==
=== Early diplomatic roles ===
Čolak-Antić's diplomatic career began in 1899 as the secretary of the Serbian delegation in Sofia. He was later appointed Minister Plenipotentiary to the Principality of Bulgaria. This appointment came three years after Ferdinand was recognised as King of the Bulgarians by the Great Powers, during a period of turmoil in neighbouring Ottoman provinces. Čolak-Antić expressed concern to his government about secret talks between the Bulgarians and the Ottomans regarding unrest in Macedonia, which bypassed representatives of other communities: Serbian, Greek, and Vlach. He warned his government about Bulgaria's expansionist intentions, as Macedonia was at the time the focus of diplomatic and political activity for both Bulgaria and Serbia. The rise of nationalistic visions led both countries to seek partitioning the Turkish territory and claiming it as historically theirs while preparing for war with the Ottoman Empire. Čolak-Antić's mission in Bulgaria ended in 1903, the same year the Ilinden–Preobrazhenie Uprising, a failed rebellion organised in Macedonia by a Bulgarian secret revolutionary society, intensified the path towards war.

==== Marshal of the Royal Court of Serbia (1904-1908) ====
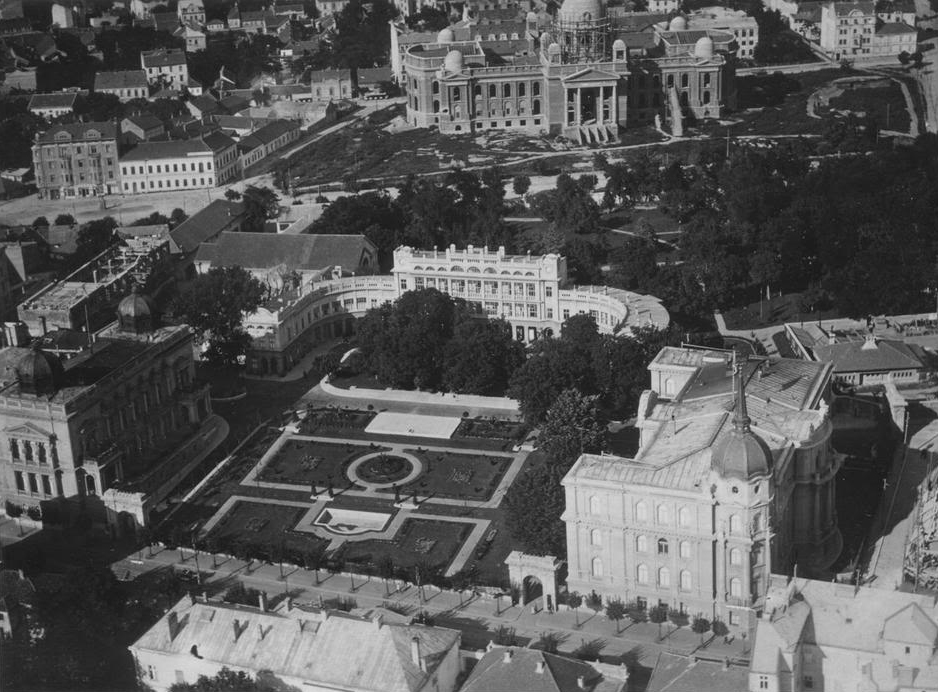
The residence and office of the Marshall of the Court (the central horseshoe-shaped building) within Belgrade's City Courts Complex.

In May 1903, by order of Foreign Minister Andra Nikolić, Čolak-Antić was recalled to Serbia. Following the change of dynasty and the coronation of King Peter I of Serbia on 21 September 1904, he was appointed acting Marshal of the Royal Court for King Peter I Karađorđević, a position he held while continuing to undertake diplomatic missions across Europe and the Middle East. On 16 October 1904, Čolak-Antić accompanied the Serbian King to Sofia, Bulgaria, along with Prime Minister Sava Grujić, Minister of Foreign Affairs Nikola Pašić, and Minister of War Radomir Putnik for an official visit with Ferdinand of Bulgaria.

==== Consul in Egypt (1908-1912) ====
His subsequent appointment was in Cairo, following an initiative to establish a Serbian diplomatic office in Egypt. In 1908, King Peter I appointed Čolak-Antić as the general consul and diplomatic agent in Cairo. That same year, he was also promoted to Marshal of the Court. At the time, Egypt was an autonomous tributary state of the Ottoman Empire under British dominance. During his tenure in Egypt, Čolak-Antić established a lifelong friendship with French Egyptologist Gaston Maspero, director of the Egyptian Museum in Cairo. Maspero mentioned him several times in his memoirs, highlighting their close association. Čolak-Antić remained in Cairo until 1912, when he returned to Serbia at the onset of the Balkan Wars.

=== Balkan Wars and World War I ===
==== Restoration of diplomatic relations with Bulgaria (1913-1914) ====
After the Second Balkan War, in mid-December 1913, Čolak-Antić returned to diplomatic service as the Plenipotentiary Minister in Sofia. On 9 January 1914, royal embassies and consulates were informed via encrypted telegram that diplomatic relations between Serbia and Bulgaria had been restored. This occurred less than a year after Bulgaria had attacked its former ally and lost the Second Balkan War, marking the first restoration of diplomatic relations since Bulgaria became a kingdom. Despite the complex intertwining of Serbian and Bulgarian interests, the desire for stability in international relations and internal pressures facilitated the swift resumption of diplomatic ties between the two countries. In this context, Čolak-Antić's appointment was accepted and validated by the Bulgarian government, and on 4 February 1914, he presented his letters of credence.

==== Outbreak of World War I (1914-1915) ====
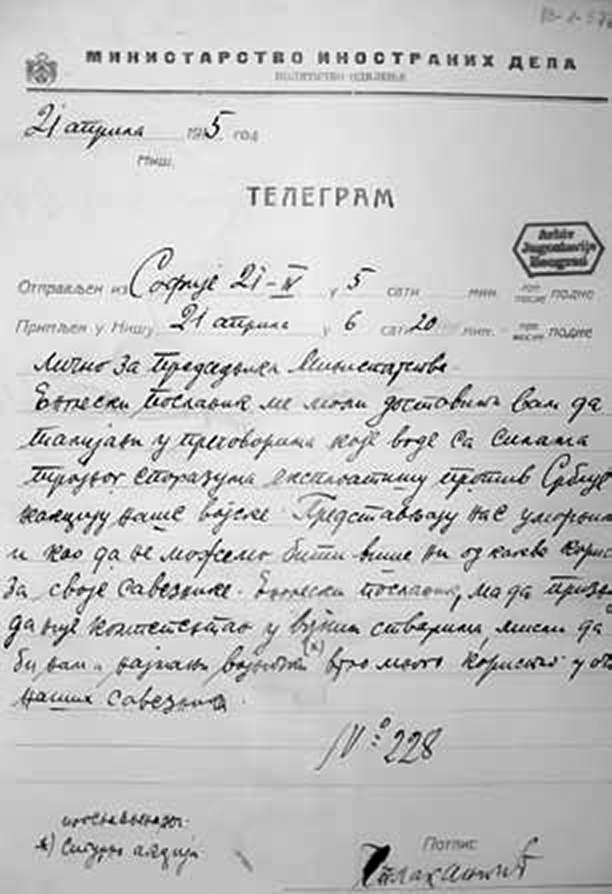
Čolak-Antić’s 21 April 1915 telegram from Sofia, warning his government of Italy’s secret negotiations with the Triple Entente.

On 28 June 1914, Archduke Franz Ferdinand was assassinated in Sarajevo. A month later, on 28 July, Austria-Hungary initiated hostilities by bombarding Belgrade, effectively starting the First World War. Although Bulgaria declared its neutrality, it simultaneously entered into secret negotiations with Austria-Hungary and Germany. In a telegram dated 1 July 1914, Čolak-Antić warned Prime Minister Nikola Pašić that a loan offered by the German Empire had bound the Bulgarian government to the camp of the Triple Alliance, posing an imminent danger to Serbia. He also informed Pašić that the Bulgarians had appointed eighteen vojvodes (military commanders) to various cities in Macedonia, indicating preparations that threatened Serbian interests in the region.

On 10 August 1915, Čolak-Antić met with Bulgarian Prime Minister Vasil Radoslavov, presenting a proposal from Serbian Prime Minister Pašić for a mutual settlement to resolve all disputes between the two countries, particularly regarding prisoners of war, without the need for Allied mediation. Radoslavov rejected the proposal, asking for more time, and assured Čolak-Antić that Bulgaria would remain completely neutral, regardless of the conflict between Austria and Serbia. Not trusting Radoslavov's assurances, Čolak-Antić informed his government that Bulgaria's participation on the side of the Central Powers seemed inevitable. His suspicions were confirmed when, on 24 August 1915, Radoslavov signed a secret agreement with the German Empire, followed by a treaty of friendship and alliance. Later that day, Radoslavov signed a military convention with Germany and Austria-Hungary, placing Bulgaria firmly in the camp of the Central Powers and making it an enemy of Serbia, Russia, France, and Britain, and an ally of the Ottoman Empire.

==== Bulgaria joins the Central Powers (1915) ====
On 9 September 1915, Tsar Ferdinand and Prime Minister Vasil Radoslavov of Bulgaria signed a decree for general mobilisation. Rumours of Bulgaria's military preparations began to circulate widely. Čolak-Antić promptly warned Prime Minister Nikola Pašić about these developments, emphasising the imminent threat to Serbia. Despite these warnings, the Bulgarian government continued to deny any aggressive intentions.

In Serbia, Field Marshal Radomir Putnik, the Chief of the General Staff, advocated for a pre-emptive strike against Bulgaria during its mobilisation, viewing it as Serbia's only viable option before another potential attack by Austria-Hungary. Čolak-Antić was dismayed when the British Foreign Secretary, Edward Grey, insisted on giving Bulgaria another chance, believing Bulgarian assurances of peaceful intentions towards the Allies.

The Triple Entente attempted to defuse the situation by issuing an ultimatum to Bulgaria, but these efforts proved unsuccessful. On 23 September 1915, recognising Bulgaria's alignment with the Central Powers, the Triple Entente severed diplomatic relations with Bulgaria. In response, and following orders from his government, Serbian Plenipotentiary Minister Čolak-Antić departed from Bulgaria, marking a significant escalation in the regional tensions.

==== War efforts and exile (1915-1918) ====
On 6 October 1915, the combined armies of Germany and Austria-Hungary launched a full-scale invasion of Serbia, escalating the conflict in the Balkans during the First World War. The Serbian army, already weakened by previous conflicts and epidemics, faced overwhelming forces on multiple fronts. On 11 October, without prior declaration of war, Bulgaria joined the offensive against Serbia from the east, placing immense pressure on the Serbian military and government. In response to these developments, Čolak-Antić immediately returned to Serbia. On 31 October 1915, he arrived in Raška and met with representatives from France, Great Britain, Russia, and Italy, facilitating discussions aimed at reinforcing Serbia's alliances and securing urgent aid. After spending the night in Raška, he escorted these representatives to Mitrovica for consultations with King Peter I, Prime Minister Nikola Pašić, and other government officials.

Facing overwhelming enemy forces and the risk of encirclement, the Serbian government and military leadership decided to conduct a strategic retreat through the mountains of Albania towards the Adriatic Sea. The retreat, undertaken during harsh winter conditions, resulted in significant loss of life due to severe weather, lack of resources, and disease. Upon reaching the Albanian coast, survivors were evacuated by Allied naval forces to the island of Corfu, where the Serbian government established itself in exile, and the army underwent reorganisation. In 1916, Čolak-Antić relocated to Salonika (Thessaloniki), where the reconstituted Serbian army joined Allied forces on the Macedonian Front. His brother, Vojin Čolak-Antić, now a colonel, commanded the 3rd Serbian Cavalry Brigade. In Salonika, Čolak-Antić was involved in the trial of Colonel Dragutin Dimitrijević (Apis) and other members of the Black Hand, which addressed internal conflicts within the Serbian military and government.

During this period, Čolak-Antić was reappointed as Marshal of the Court, navigating the complex relationships between the monarchy, government, and military during wartime. Amidst an atmosphere of mistrust between politicians and military officers, he reportedly stated: "Trust no one. Suspect everyone." For the remainder of the war, while the Serbian government operated between Corfu, Salonika, and Nice, and the army continued fighting on the Salonika Front, Serbia remained under Bulgarian and Austria-Hungarian occupation. The civilian population suffered under harsh military rule, facing repression, forced labour, famine, and disease. During this time, Čolak-Antić undertook diplomatic missions across Europe to maintain alliances with the Entente Powers and to advocate for increased military and humanitarian support for Serbia. The successful Allied offensive on the Salonika Front in September 1918 led to the retreat of Bulgarian and Austro-Hungarian forces, contributing to the collapse of the Central Powers on this front.

=== Post-war diplomatic service ===
==== Ambassador to Sweden (1918-1920) ====
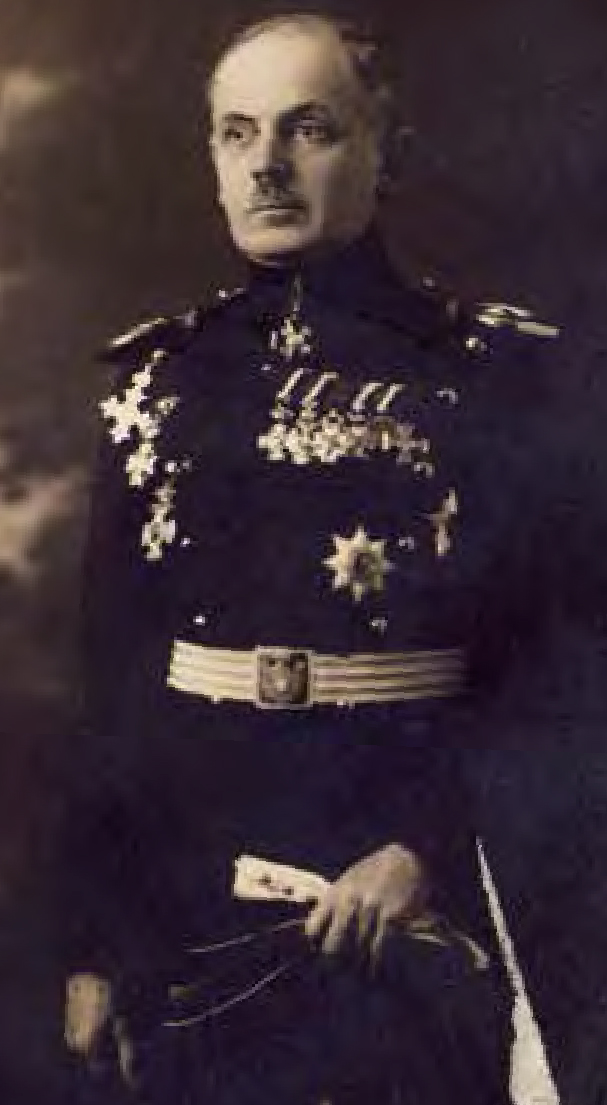
Boško Čolak-Antić in military uniform as Royal Envoy to Sweden in Stockholm, circa 1919.

After returning to diplomatic duties in 1918, Čolak-Antić was appointed as the Ambassador of the newly formed Kingdom of Serbs, Croats and Slovenes to Sweden, taking up residence in Stockholm on 18 February 1918, during the final year of World War I. This appointment was part of an agreement between Prime Minister Nikola Pašić and the opposition, aiming to strengthen the Serbian diplomatic service in response to Serbia's weakened international standing following the Bolshevik Revolution and the Brest-Litovsk Peace Treaty between the Bolsheviks and the Central Powers. In his role, Čolak-Antić focused on enhancing trade relations with Sweden, monitoring developments in Russia, and maintaining diplomatic ties with smaller nations to protect mutual interests against the influence of the major powers within the League of Nations.

In December 1918, King Ferdinand of Romania sought to honour Regent Alexander of Serbia to foster closer bilateral relations and alleviate tensions in the Banat region, which was under Serbian military occupation. Čolak-Antić was invited to a court reception in Bucharest, where King Ferdinand expressed his wish for Alexander to marry one of his daughters. Queen Marie of Romania asked Čolak-Antić to promptly convey this matrimonial proposal to Belgrade. This diplomatic gesture was part of broader efforts to strengthen alliances and stabilize the region in the post-war environment.

Amidst the turmoil of the Russian Civil War, widespread concern grew over the uncertain fate of the Russian imperial family. On 28 December 1918, Čolak-Antić informed Crown Prince Aleksandar Karađorđević that the Bolsheviks had likely taken the Russian Empress and her daughters with them during their retreat, suggesting they might still be alive. He relayed that Princess Jelena Petrovna doubted reports of their deaths, citing accounts from Arkhangelsk indicating that Grand Duchess Tatiana had written to Grand Duke Kirill, claiming the Russian Emperor was alive, a belief held by many at the time. Čolak-Antić also confirmed the death of Prince Ioann Konstantinovich Romanov, who was married to the Serbian king’s daughter.

Earlier, on 21 September, Čolak-Antić had reached out to Miroslav Spalajković, the Serbian representative in Arkhangelsk, seeking information about Princess Jelena and her children, emphasising the king's concern for their safety. Spalajković erroneously reported that Princess Jelena was in Yekaterinburg and that her children were with their grandmother in Petrograd. In reality, she was being held hostage in Perm. Following her release, secured by the Norwegian envoy, she travelled from Moscow to Sweden. In December 1918, Čolak-Antić hosted Princess Jelena at the Serbian embassy in Stockholm, where she received financial assistance from the king. She was accompanied by her mother-in-law, Grand Duchess Yelisaveta Mavrikievna, and her children. On 25 December, Čolak-Antić personally escorted Princess Jelena and her family to Copenhagen, from where they departed for France.

On 8 December 1920, following a budget reduction, the Yugoslav Foreign Ministry closed all diplomatic representations in the Scandinavian countries, including the embassies in Sweden, Denmark, and Norway. Čolak-Antić concluded his tenure in Sweden and departed the country that year.

==== Ambassador to Romania (1920-1935) ====
On 3 March 1920, Čolak-Antić was appointed Envoy Extraordinary and Minister Plenipotentiary to Romania. According to historian Srđan Mićić, alongside Živojin Balugdžić and Miroslav Spalajković, he became one of the top diplomats under Regent and later King Alexander I Karađorđević. Based in Bucharest, he represented Yugoslavia in discussions related to the Little Entente with Czechoslovakia and Romania, aiming to build a common defence against Hungary. His tenure in Bucharest was marked by significant efforts to strengthen bilateral relations and promote regional security. During his service, Čolak-Antić also played a pivotal role in formal receptions at the Romanian court. Alongside Dr. Momčilo Ninčić, he facilitated the marriage between Princess Maria of Romania and King Alexander I of Yugoslavia, which took place in Belgrade in 1922. This alliance further solidified the ties between the two countries.

On 7 July 1923, in Bucharest, following an agreement between the two kingdoms, Čolak-Antić, as Plenipotentiary Delegate, signed the Convention on the Defence Alliance between the Kingdom of Romania and the Kingdom of Yugoslavia. This treaty was a cornerstone in the efforts to maintain stability in the region during the interwar period. The first article of the Convention stipulated: "In the case of an unprovoked attack by Hungary on either High Contracting Party, the other Party shall come to the aid of the attacked Party in accordance with the Treaty provided for." The protocol extending the political and military conventions for three years was signed on the Romanian side by Ion G. Duca, Minister of Foreign Affairs.

His brother, Vojin Čolak-Antić, served as the military attaché in Bucharest from July 1923 to January 1927, working on resolving issues related to the tri-border area between the Kingdom of Yugoslavia, Romania, and Hungary. The collaboration between Yugoslavia and Romania during the 1920s and early 1930s peaked significantly largely due to Čolak-Antić's diplomatic dedication to fostering a productive political climate. During his time in Bucharest, Čolak-Antić maintained detailed records of his experiences and observations, which were later published in a book, providing valuable insights into the diplomatic history of the era.

== Later years and retirement ==
In July 1929, while serving as head of the Yugoslav delegation, Čolak-Antić was temporarily recalled to Belgrade to receive new instructions from Vojislav Marinković, the Minister of Foreign Affairs. During this period, regional alliances were shifting, with Romania beginning to draw closer to Bulgaria and strengthening its relations with Hungary. Concerned by these developments, Čolak-Antić advocated for a meeting of the Little Entente, urging Romania to clarify its position. He grew increasingly critical of the Romanian military's "lack of frankness" and began questioning the effectiveness of the Little Entente and the strength of Romanian-Yugoslav ties.

Despite these concerns, Čolak-Antić continued his diplomatic duties in Bucharest. In June 1929 he led the Yugoslav delegation in negotiations between the two countries. In July 1932, he was appointed acting Minister of the Court for King Alexander I, succeeding Bogoljub Jevtić, who had become Foreign Minister. Balancing his responsibilities in both his diplomatic post and the royal court, he remained deeply involved in managing the complexities of interwar alliances. On 1 February 1933, he was invited to attend a significant Little Entente conference alongside Foreign Minister Marinković, held on the sidelines of a League of Nations session.

The assassination of King Alexander I in 1934 brought significant shifts in the Serbian political landscape. Known for his close ties to the late kings Petar I and Alexander I, Čolak-Antić's position was reassessed amid the changing power dynamics. In the summer of 1935, he was recalled from his post as plenipotentiary minister in Romania and succeeded by Nikola Perić. Shortly thereafter, in March 1935, he was appointed Marshal of the Royal Court for the young King Peter II, a role he held until his retirement in May 1936. During this period, his brother, General Vojin Čolak-Antić, served as aide-de-camp to the king, adding to the family's involvement at the royal court. Even after his official retirement, Čolak-Antić's expertise remained in demand. In 1939, Romanian officials approached him to act as a mediator to help restore bilateral relations that had become strained following the Munich Agreement and shifting European alliances.

The onset of World War II further destabilised the region. In November 1940, Romania signed the Tripartite Pact, aligning itself with Germany, Italy, and Japan. In April 1941, Germany invaded Yugoslavia without a declaration of war, leading to the partitioning of Yugoslav territory among Germany, Italy, Hungary, and Bulgaria. During the occupation, Čolak-Antić, along with former Foreign Minister Aleksandar Cincar-Marković and general Petar Kosić, was arrested and interned in a German camp.

== Personal life ==
Čolak-Antić, known for his passion for sports and physical activities, founded the Serbian Cycling Society in 1885, which became the main national governing body for cycling in Serbia, Čolak-Antić was also a practitioner of martial arts. An accomplished equestrian, Čolak-Antić was involved in horse racing with his brother, General Vojin Čolak-Antić, together, they maintained a stable known as the Čolak-Antić Brothers Stable.

A notable event in his personal life occurred on 13 March 1905, when Čolak-Antić challenged Milan Pavlović, the Editor-in-Chief of Opozicija, to a duel. The challenge was issued after an article by Pavlović, which Čolak-Antić felt insulted the memory of his late father, Colonel Ilija Čolak-Antić, a respected war hero. While Čolak-Antić preferred to duel with sabres, Pavlović objected, leading them to agree on pistols. The duel took place on 16 March at 4 p.m. in a clearing at Banovo Brdo, with both opponents standing 20 paces apart. Witnesses, including Dr Roman Sondermajer, oversaw the event. Both men fired but emerged unharmed. The incident was reported by Čolak-Antić’s brother-in-law, Vladislav F. Ribnikar, founder of the newspaper Politika, who noted: "Yesterday at exactly 4 o'clock in the afternoon, there was a duel between Mr Boško Čolak-Antić, Marshal of the Court, and Milan Pavlović, Editor-in-Chief of Opozicija." Although duelling was illegal, authorities took no action. Opozicija, known for its fierce criticism of the government, ceased publication a month later.

In his professional life, Čolak-Antić was esteemed for his diplomatic skills. During World War I negotiations with Bulgaria in July 1915, he was described as possessing "a refined courtesy and a real impartiality which dictated all the actions of his important position during a very delicate situation." According to Prince Grigorii Nikolaevich Trubetskoi, during his tenure as the Serbian representative in Sofia, Čolak-Antić was consistently courteous and amiable and, despite the prevailing Bulgarian animosity towards the Serbs, Čolak-Antić earned their respect and admiration by his exemplary demeanour. The French historian Marcel Dunan later characterised him as "a perfect gentleman, an aristocrat, who could have passed as a member of the Court of Henry III."

== Legacy and cultural depictions ==
In the Serbian TV series Aleksandar of Yugoslavia, directed by Zdravko Šotra and based on the novel of the same name by Vuk Drašković, Boško Čolak-Antić is portrayed by Serbian actor Marko Janjić.

== Publications ==
- Édouard Beneš et la Petite entente (1934)

== Notes ==
1. In diplomatic records his name is attested as Dr. Boshko Tcholak-Antitch

Diplomatic posts
| Preceded by Unknown | Serbian Ambassador to Egypt; 1908–1912 | Succeeded by Office abolished |
| Preceded by Office created | Serbian Ambassador to Bulgaria; 1913–1915 | Succeeded by Office abolished |
| Preceded by Office created | Yugoslav Ambassador to Sweden; 1918–1920 | Succeeded by Unknown |
| Preceded by Unknown | Yugoslav Ambassador to Romania; 1920–1935 | Succeeded by Unknown |
Court offices
| Preceded by n/a | Marshal of the Royal Court of Serbia; 1904—1907 | Succeeded by n/a |
| Preceded by n/a | Marshal of the Royal Court of Serbia; 1915—1917 | Succeeded by Petar Živković |
| Preceded by Slavko Grujić | Marshal of the Royal Court of Yugoslavia; 1935—1941 | Succeeded by Office abolished |
