= Yugoslav-Hungarian Boundary Commission =

International post-WWI body (1920–24)

- Commission de délimitation des frontières entre la Yougoslavie et la Hongrie
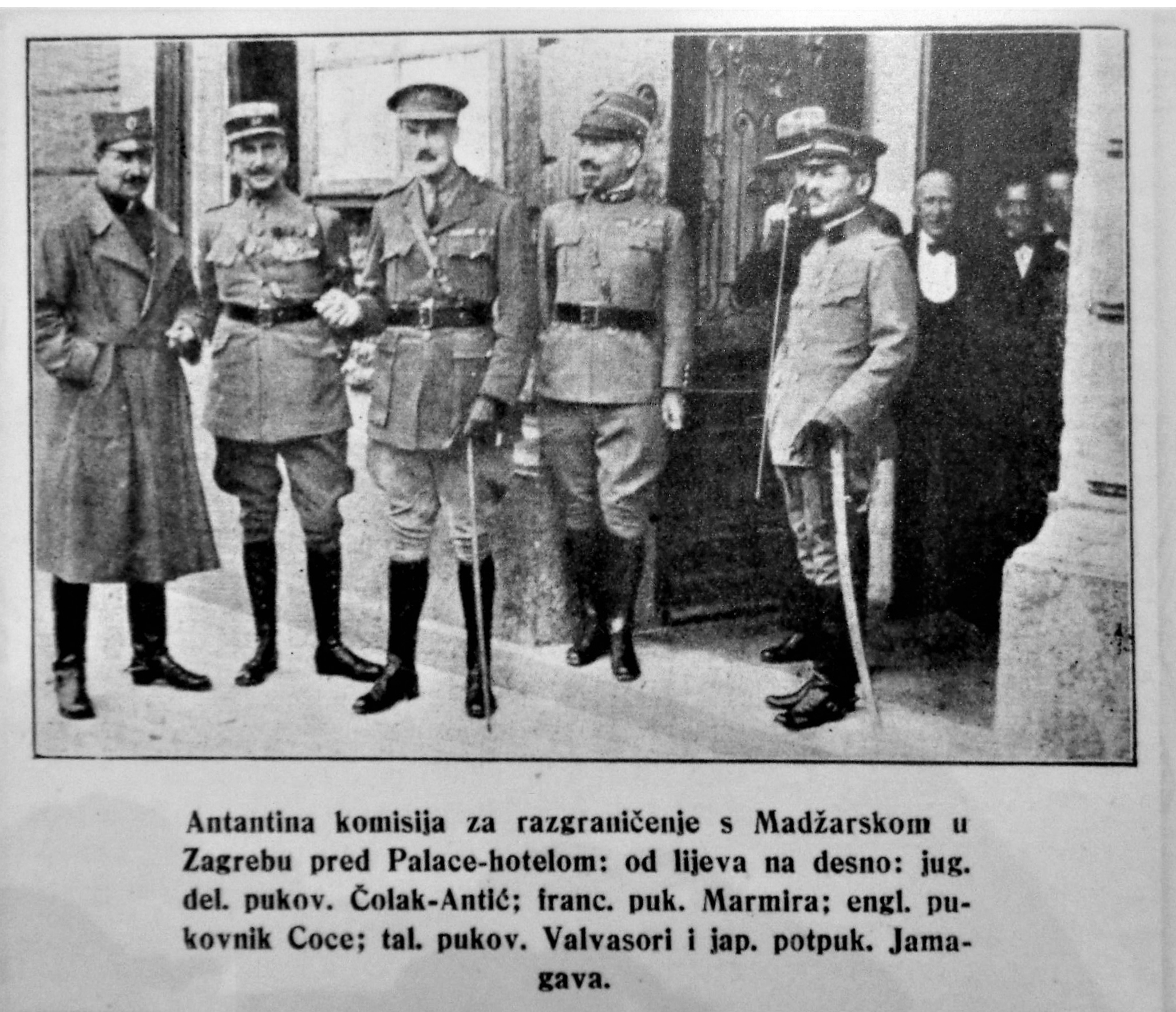
- Members of the Yugoslav-Hungarian Boundary Commission
- Formation: 4 June 1920
- Dissolved: 10 July 1924
- Purpose: Delimitation and mapping of the Yugoslav-Hungarian border
- Headquarters: Varaždin, Croatia
- Commissioners: (United Kingdom) Lt. Col. Cree; (Italy) Col. Luigi Valvassori; (France) Lt Col. Marminia; (Japan) Lt. Col. Yanagawa; (Kingdom of Yugoslavia) Col. Vojin Čolak-Antić; (Kingdom of Hungary) Col. Károly Vassel

The Yugoslav-Hungarian Boundary Commission (French: Commission de délimitation des frontières entre la Yougoslavie et la Hongrie) was established to define the new frontier between Hungary and the Kingdom of Serbs, Croats and Slovenes following the Treaty of Trianon (1920). Its task was to implement border changes agreed upon at the Paris Peace Conference, 1919–1920 after the dissolution of Austria-Hungary.

== History ==
Following the Treaty of Trianon, Hungary's borders were significantly redrawn, resulting in territorial losses to its neighboring states. The Yugoslav-Hungarian Boundary Commission was formed to establish a definitive border between Hungary and the Kingdom of Serbs, Croats and Slovenes. The commission consisted of legal experts, historians, geographers, and military personnel, who worked to document and delineate the border based on historical claims, ethnic compositions, and strategic considerations. Article 43 provided the legal framework for the formation and work of this Commission:

A Commission consisting of seven members, five nominated by the Principal Allied and Associated Powers, one by the Serb-Croat-Slovene State, and one by Hungary, shall be constituted within fifteen days from the coming into force of the present Treaty to trace on the spot the frontier line described in Article 27 (2), Part II (Frontiers of Hungary).

— Treaty of Trianon, Article 43,

The Commission was chaired by British delegate Lt. Col. David Cree. Other members included Col. Luigi Valvassori (Italy), Lt Col. Maurice Marminia (France), Lt. Col. Yanagawa Heisuke (Japan), alongside national representatives Col. Károly Vassel for Hungary and Col. Vojin Čolak-Antić for the Kingdom of Serbs, Croats and Slovenes.

=== Delimitation process ===
The Commission convened for the first time in Paris on 1 August 1921 at the French Army's Geographic Service offices. subsequent meeting was held on 18 August 1921. In November 1922, after extensive fieldwork and consultations, the six commissioners signed the finalised border agreement.

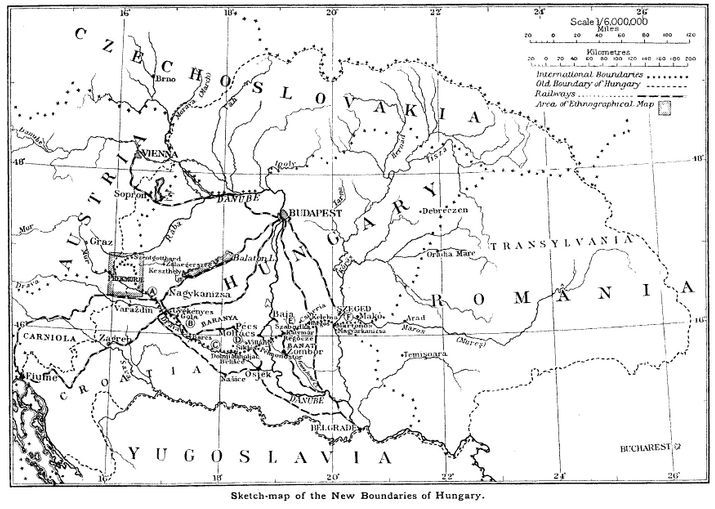
Sketch map of the new boundaries of Hungary in The Geographical Journal vol. 65, no. 2 of 1925

The Commission received official directives from the Central Geographical Committee to ensure consistency with treaty provisions. Before fieldwork commenced, representatives from Hungary and Yugoslavia were required to provide interpretations of the treaty's provisions, particularly in disputed areas. Meetings were held in border communities on both sides, where municipal officials, landowners, and industry representatives presented their perspectives. These discussions informed the commission's recommendations.

The President of the Commission facilitated negotiations between Hungarian and Yugoslav delegates. Once an agreement was reached, a designated team member drafted the proposed boundary. Modifications were debated, with decisions made unanimously or by vote when necessary. The final boundary was recorded on maps at a scale of 1:75,000, signed by commission members, and later physically marked by Hungarian and Yugoslav assistant commissioners.

By the conclusion of its work in 1924, Hungary had ceded western Banat, Bačka, Međimurje, and Prekmurje to the Kingdom of Serbs, Croats, and Slovenes. The Baranja region, including Pécs, was divided along the Clemenceau Line, with its southern part annexed. The Commission's work established long-lasting borders that remain in place today between Slovenia and Hungary. Prekmurje, predominantly inhabited by Slovenes but historically under Hungarian rule since the 11th century, became an integral part of Slovene national territory.

== Significance ==
Historians consider the Yugoslav-Hungarian Boundary Commission instrumental in stabilizing postwar Central Europe. The border agreements helped define national territories and played a role in the broader restructuring of European states in the wake of World War I. The treaty's terms, however, remained contentious in Hungary, where the loss of territory contributed to long-term political tensions in the interwar period.

== Sources ==
- United States Congress (1948). Congressional Record: Proceedings and Debates of the ... Congress. U.S. Government Printing Office. p. 1-PA116.
- Domonkos, L. (1999). 33 months in Baranya, 1918–1921 (in Hungarian). Püski. ISBN 978-963-9188-39-6.
- Biagini, A.; Motta, G. (2014). Empires and Nations from the Eighteenth to the Twentieth Century: Drafting the Hungarian-Yugoslav border. Cambridge Scholars Publisher. ISBN 978-1-4438-6542-5.
- Grumel-Jacquignon, F. (1999). La Yougoslavie dans la stratégie française de l'entre-deux-guerres (1918-1935) (in French). Peter Lang. ISBN 978-3-906762-88-3.
- Kasperson, R.E.; Minghi, J.V. (2011). The Structure of Political Geography. Transaction Publishers. ISBN 978-1-4128-1854-4.
- Prescott, J.R.V. (2014). Political Frontiers and Boundaries. Routledge Library Editions: Political Geography. Taylor & Francis. ISBN 978-1-317-60199-9.
- Romsics, I. (2002). The Dismantling of Historic Hungary: The Peace Treaty of Trianon, 1920. CHSP Hungarian authors series. Social Science Monographs. ISBN 978-0-88033-505-8.
- "Treaty of Trianon". World War I Document Archive. 1920-06-04.
