= Ilija Čolak-Antić =

Serbian Army officer and military attaché (1836–1894)

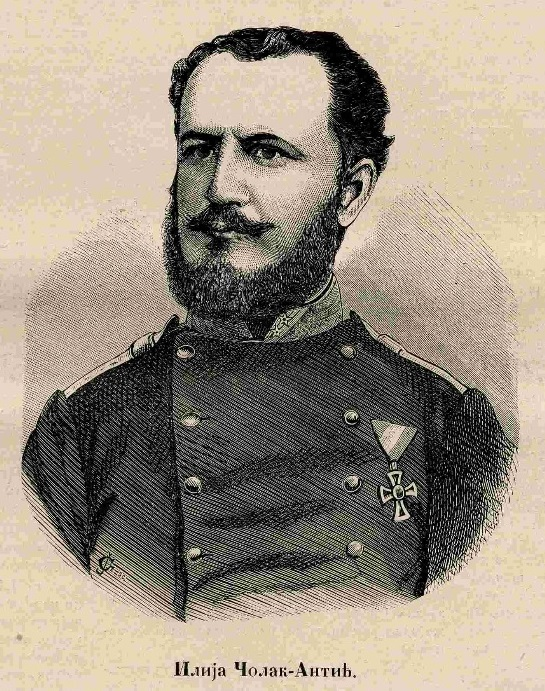
- Born: 4 July 1836; Čačak, Principality of Serbia
- Died: 12 October 1894 (aged 58); Belgrade, Kingdom of Serbia
- Spouse: Jelena Matić
- Children: Boško Čolak-Antić; Vojin Čolak-Antić
- Relatives: Čolak-Anta Simeonović
- Military career
- Allegiance: Kingdom of Serbia, Principality of Serbia
- Service years: 1851–1878
- Rank: Colonel
- Unit: Artillery
- Commands: Ibar Army; Ušica Division; Čačak Brigade
- Conflicts: Serbian–Turkish Wars
- Awards: Cross of Takovo (2); Order of Prince Danilo I
- Other work: Military attaché

Ilija Čolak-Antić (4 July 1836 – 12 October 1894) was a Serbian Army officer and military diplomat who played a significant role in the Serbian–Turkish Wars, leading military units and contributing to Serbia's struggle for independence from the Ottoman Empire. Following the wars, he was instrumental in shaping Serbia's military and diplomatic strategy in the newly independent kingdom.

A graduate of the Serbian Military Academy, Čolak-Antić received advanced artillery training as a state cadet in Belgium. Upon his return to Serbia, he founded and later managed the arsenal in Kragujevac, where his expertise in artillery contributed to the modernisation of Serbia's military capabilities in anticipation of a conflict with the Ottoman Empire. Shortly before the outbreak of the Herzegovina uprising, he commanded a battalion group and later served as an intelligence officer in the Sanjak of Novi Pazar. During the First Serbo-Turkish War, he was awarded the Order of the Cross of Takovo for bravery and succeeded General Zach as commander of the Ibar Army. In the Second War of 1877–1878, he served as the chief of staff of the Serbian Army's Drina Corps.

Following the treaty of Berlin, Čolak-Antić held a series of diplomatic missions in France and Italy for the Serbian Ministry of Defence before being appointed military attaché to the Austro-Hungarian empire. He later conducted additional diplomatic and procurement missions in France, Italy and the Russian Empire, while also teaching at the Military Academy.

== Early life and family background ==
Ilija K. Čolak-Antić was born on 4 July 1836, in Čačak, Principality of Serbia, into a prominent Serbian noble military family originally from Old Herzegovina and Old Serbia. He was the third son of Kosta Čolak-Antić, the son of Vojvoda Čolak-Anta Simeonović, a famed insurgent leader and duke at the time of Revolutionary Serbia.

His mother, Jovanka was a daughter of Jovan "Demir" Mitrović, an Obor-kapetan in the Habsburg-Austrian army, and was related to Prince Maksim Rasković, leader of the Old Vlach during the First Serbian uprising. After following Karađorđe into exile in Bessarabia, the family lived in Saint Petersburg where his father was admitted to the First Cadet Corps by special decree of Emperor Alexander I. The family returned to Serbia in 1830 and his father was appointed district judge in Čačak. They lived in Kruševac, then the Serbian capital. Čolak-Antić had three brothers Lazar, Ljubomir, and Vlajko as well as a sister Christina.

When he was twelve both his parents died and Čolak-Antić and his siblings were raised by a relative. He finished elementary school in Užice before attending secondary school in Kragujevac.

== Military education and early service ==
After graduating from secondary school in 1851, Čolak-Antić entered the Military Academy at the age of fifteen with the rank of 2nd class. Upon completion of his studies in 1857 he was sent to Liege, Belgium for postgraduate training as an Officer cadet, while his brother Lazar studied at the Prussian Artillery School alongside Sava Grujić and Dimitrije Đurić. Together with Stanojlo Stokić, Čolak-Antić translated the Prussian officers' manual Die Wissenschaft des Kampfes (The Science of Combat) which became one of the combat manuals of the Serbian Military Academy. His stay in Belgium was extended until 1858 at the request of the Serbian government to study weapon manufacturing, as the Principality of Serbia did not produce its own weapons and relied on surplus from the Austrian and Russian armies.

Upon returning to Serbia, Čolak-Antić taught at the Artillery School in Belgrade before joining the Ministry of Defense. From 1859 to 1872, in anticipation of a conflict with the Ottoman Empire, he was responsible for reforming artillery and modernising the Serbian Army's weapons under the supervision of Minister of War Milivoje Blaznavac. During this period, Serbia was actively seeking a supplier of modern weapons equipped with the new percussion system. After the hasty purchase of defective M1867 rifles by the minister, Čolak-Antić organized their conversion at the Kragujevac Arsenal.

In 1865, Prince Mihailo Obrenović sent Čolak-Antić on a secret mission to Vienna to acquire weapons for the Principality of Montenegro. After successfully completing this task, Prince Nikola Petrović-Njegoš awarded him the Order of Prince Danilo I. After spending a year at the War Office, the headquarters of the Armed forces of the Principality of Serbia, Čolak-Antić was appointed commander of a battalion group encompassing Čačak, Rudnik, and Užice. In 1875, during the Herzegovina uprising, he was sent to the Sanjak of Novi Pazar as an intelligence officer to gather information and advise the insurgents.

== Command in the Serbian–Ottoman Wars ==
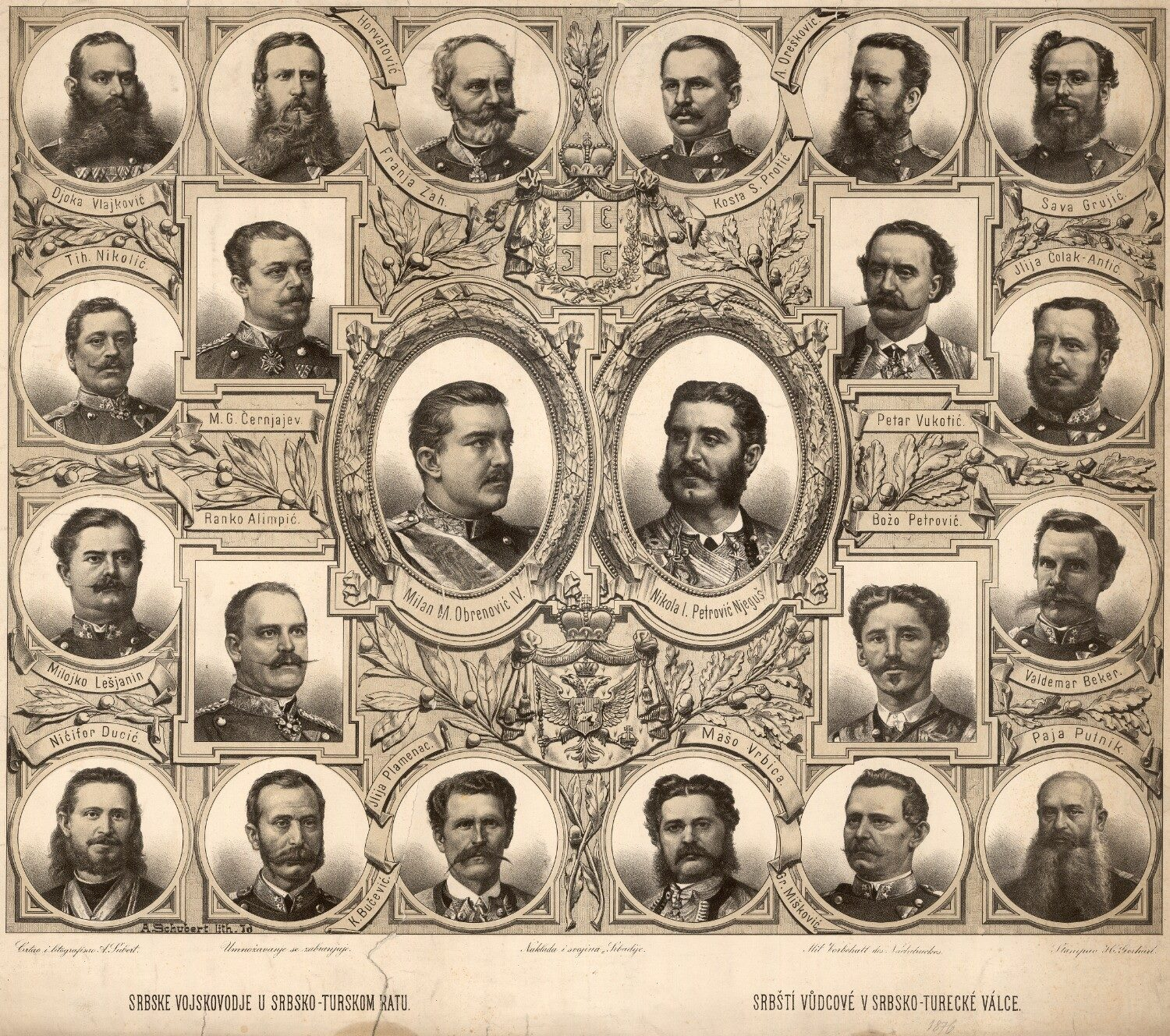
The Serbian Commanders of the First Serbian–Ottoman War. Čolak-Antić second from the top, on the right side.

At the outbreak of the Serbian-Ottoman War in June 1876, Čolak-Antić was appointed commander of the Čačak brigade, while his brother Lazar's unit was attached to the main army under Mikhail Chernyayev, commanding the Kruševac brigade. Their other brother Ljubomir Čolak-Antić managed the arsenal in Kragujevac. On 8 July Čolak-Antić leading the Užice Division successfully repelled the Ottomans, who had crossed the border at Raška pushing them back towards Novi Pazar. On the proposal of the Minister of Defense, the government issued a law on 7 July 1876, establishing "awards for meritorious service in war," with Čolak-Antić among the first recipients. Prince Milan Obrenović (the future Serbian king) awarded him the Order of the Cross of Takovo for bravery.

After the wounding of General František Zach, Čolak-Antić was promoted to commander of the Ibar Army, as he was considered Zach's best lieutenant and was highly popular with the troops. Leading a corps of twelve thousand soldiers and six thousand volunteers, he launched a new offensive on 24 July toward Sjenica, pushing back a Turkish column under Dervish Pasha. His forces besieged the town for about two weeks, using heavy artillery against its fortifications.

On 28 September, while leading the left wing of General Đura Horvatović's army, Čolak-Antić launched an attack on the Turkish right rear, defended by Adyl Pasha. For his distinguished performance in the subsequent battles, he was promoted to the rank of colonel. His brother, Major Lazar Čolak-Antić, was promoted to lieutenant colonel and also received a medal for bravery for his defense of the Jankova Gorge, northwest of Čučale, where he led a corps of Serbian volunteers against a much larger Turkish force. In the Second War of 1877-1878 Čolak-Antić served as the deputy commander of the Moravia Corps before becoming chief of staff of the Drina Corps.

== Post-War diplomatic and military engagements ==
After the war and the subsequent autonomy of Serbia, Čolak-Antić was sent on several missions abroad for the Serbian government His first assignment was in Paris where he negotiated contracts for the purchase of military equipment for the newly formed Serbian Kingdom. He was then appointed head of the artillery administration in Vienna on 25 November 1879. as head of the artillery administration. In Austria, he visited arsenals alongside foundry controller Živadin Dimitrijević before traveling to Italy to study gunpowder fabrication in Naples, Capua, Scafati, Turin and Genoa. He and Dimitrijević later returned to Vienna to study the Vienna Arsenal, and they reported their findings to the Minister of War upon their return to Belgrade on 29 February 1880.

In 1884–1885 Čolak-Antić served as military attaché in Vienna. He also chaired the military commission on weapons-related matters on several occasions. On 1 January 1891, on behalf of King Aleksandar Obrenović, royal deputies decorated the retired Colonel Čolak-Antić with the Order of the Cross of Takovo, Second Class. He died on 12 October 1894, in Belgrade at the age of 58.

== Personal life ==
Čolak-Antić married Jelena (née Matić), the daughter of prominent Liberal politician and philosopher Dimitrije Matić who served as President of the National Assembly in 1878 when Serbia gained independence from the Ottoman Empire. They had three children, Boško Čolak-Antić (1871–1949) Marshal of the Court and a diplomat; Vojin Čolak-Antić (1877–1945), General in the Royal Serbian Army and Royal Yugoslav Army; and Jovanka who died as a volunteer nurse at the beginning of the First World War. After the death of his brother Lazar in October 1877 in Kruševac, Čolak-Antić took care of Lazar's daughter Milica, who later married Vladislav Ribnikar, the founder of Politika.

== See also ==
- Čolak-Antić family
