= Čolak-Anta =

Serbian revolutionary commander (1777–1853)

Vojvoda Čolak-Anta Simeonović
- Чолак-Анта Симеоновић
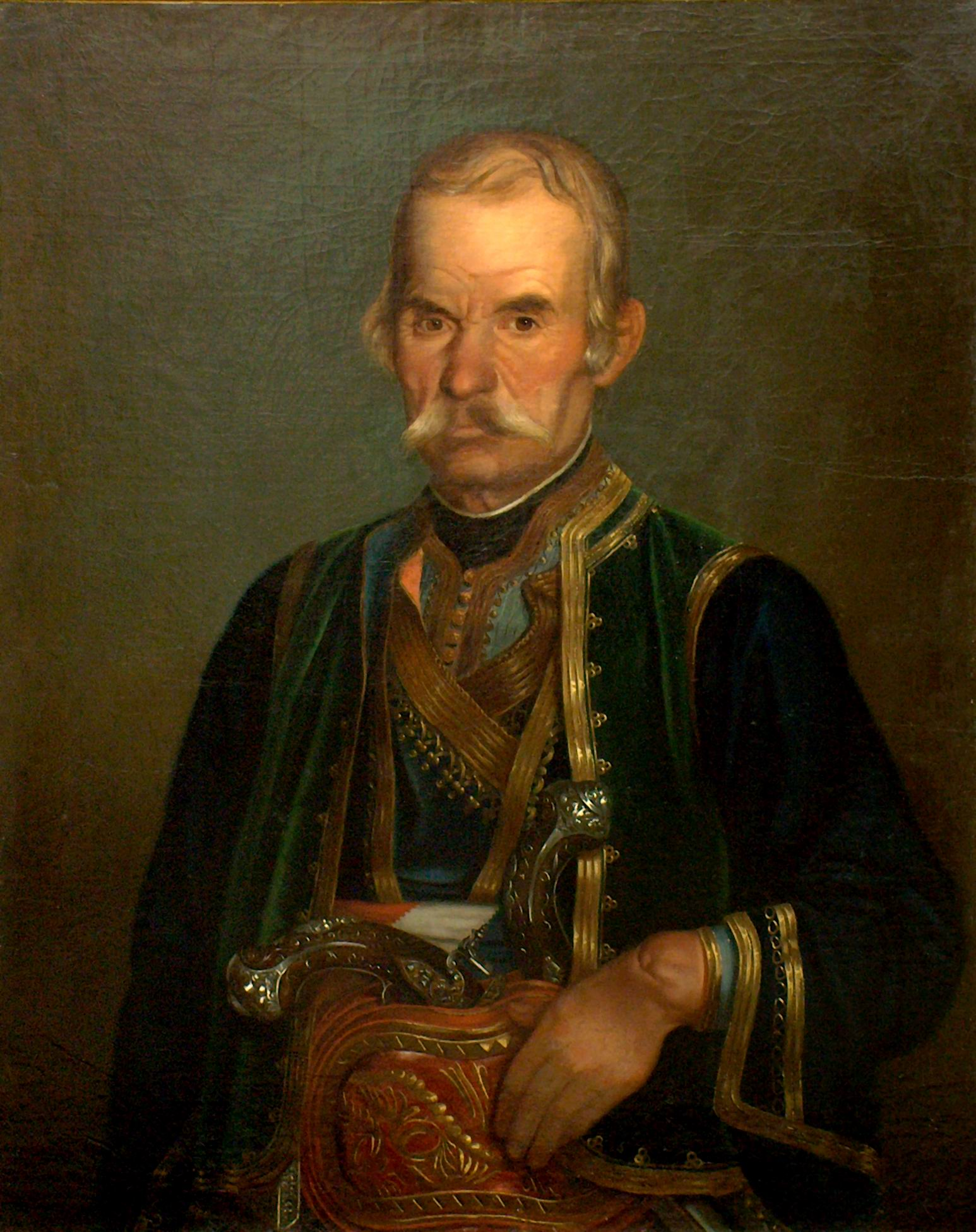
- Born: Antonije Simeonović; 17 January 1777; Prizren, Ottoman Empire
- Died: 23 August 1853 (aged 76); Kragujevac, Principality of Serbia
- Children: 7
- Relatives: Ilija Čolak-Antić (grandson)
- Military career
- Allegiance: Serbian revolutionaries
- Rank: Vojvoda
- Nickname: Čolak-Anta
- Conflicts: First Serbian Uprising

Čolak-Anta Simeonović (Serbian Cyrillic: Чолак-Анта Симеоновић; 1777–1853) was a Serbian military commander and revolutionary leader who played a significant role in the First Serbian Uprising (1804–1813), the initial phase of Serbia’s struggle for independence from the Ottoman Empire. A close ally of Karađorđe Petrović, he was known for his military skill, bravery, and leadership, which earned him the title of vojvoda. Following the collapse of the uprising, he went into exile before returning to Serbia to contribute to its administrative and judicial systems. He is the eponymous founder of the Čolak-Antić family.

== Early life ==
Antonije Simeonović, later known as Čolak-Anta, was born on 17 January 1777, the feast day of St Anthony the Great, in Prizren, At the time of his birth, Prizren was under Ottoman rule and renowned as a centre of trade and craftsmanship. Čolak-Anta was born to Simeon and Neranca, members of a respected and prominent family in the region. During his youth, Čolak-Anta apprenticed as a furrier and tanner, mastering a highly regarded craft. At the age of 18, he was forced to flee his hometown of Prizren following a violent family feud and sought refuge in Belgrade, the administrative centre of the Sanjak of Smederevo, and the second largest Ottoman towns in Europe.

== The uprising ==
At the start of the 19th century, Serbia had been under Ottoman rule for over 350 years. In 1799, Ottoman Sultan Selim III allowed the return of the Dahije, renegade Janissary leaders, to Serbia. These leaders soon overthrew and murdered the popular governor Hadži Mustafa Pasha, seizing control of the region. Their oppressive regime culminated in the Slaughter of the Knezes in January 1804, during which around eighty Serbian notables (knezes) were beheaded in an attempt to suppress local leadership and prevent organised resistance. Rather than achieving submission, this act of terror united the Serbian population in revolt instead.

=== Joining the rebellion ===
During the summer of 1805, Sultan Selim III sought to crush the Serbian uprising by sending a significant army to Niš. In the ensuing Battle of Ivankovac, the Serbs secured a significant victory, prompting the Sultan to escalate the conflict by declaring a holy war. For the next two years following the outbreak, Čolak Anta participated in key battles, including Užice, Mišar, Ivanjica, and the battle of Deligrad. According to historian Dušan T. Bataković, Čolak-Anta was among the most notable Serbs from Ottoman Kosovo to join the insurrection.

In the spring of 1806, Čolak-Anta spearheaded military campaigns targeting Ottoman-controlled regions, including the burning of Kuršumlija, Prokuplje, and Banjska. These offensives were not merely acts of warfare but calculated measures designed to facilitate the migration of Serbian Christians into areas under insurgent control. Alongside Anta Protić, Čolak Anta documented these forced relocations, highlighting their dual purpose: to strengthen the insurgent forces with an influx of manpower and to undermine Ottoman authority by depriving them of a taxable and recruitable Christian population. In 1806, the Serbian rebels consolidated their power, establishing Smederevo as a temporary capital. In September 1806, Čolak-Anta joined the rebel forces in achieving a decisive victory over a larger Ottoman army at the Battle of Deligrad, resulting in a truce.

In December 1806, during the Siege of Belgrade near Ostružnica, Čolak Anta was severely wounded in the left hand while defending Serbian positions. The injury, which cost him his hand, earned him the nickname 'Čolak Anta' (One-Armed Anta). By the winter of 1806, the Serbs controlled the entire province, the rebel army then advanced towards Raška, Bosnia and Metohija. The success of the uprising heightened Ottoman fears of a Christian revolt. In response, Selim sought negotiations, offering the rebels autonomy. The Serbs, resolute in their pursuit of independence, rejected the proposal. The collapse of these negotiations led the Sultan to launch a large-scale military campaign to suppress the rebellion. On 5 January 1807, the Ottoman Empire declared war against Russia and Great Britain, while the insurgents broke through towards Southern Serbia.

== Expanding the rebellion ==
In May 1809, Čolak-Anta accompanied the Serbian leader on a campaign towards Herzegovina and Montenegro. Taking advantage of their alliance with Russia, which was at war with the Ottoman Empire, the rebel forces reached Sjenica, Nova Varoš, Prijepolje and Bijelo Polje.

These successes boosted morale and inspired widespread resistance in Herzegovina, encouraging many locals taking up arms to join the rebel forces. Karađorđe’s attempt to establish relations with the Montenegrin tribes through Sjenica led many Kosovo Serbs to join the insurgents. Petar I Petrović-Njegoš, the Bishop of Montenegro, sent an emissary along with 300 men to meet Karađorđe and deliver a letter of greetings. A deputation from the Vasojevići tribe approached Karađorđe, pledging their loyalty and readiness to fight against the Turks. On Vidovdan day (28 June), Čolak Anta, Hadži-Prodan and Raka Ljevajac presented banners to the Vasojević tribe, symbolising their formal inclusion in the uprising and appointing three standard-bearers.

=== Mission to Montenegro ===
For the first time, an entire Christian population had successfully risen against the Ottomans, and Serbia functioned as a de facto independent state. Karađorđe appealed to the brotherhood of the Montenegrins and Bosnians to unite the Serbian nation. Čolak-Anta was sent alongside Raka Ljevajac to forge an alliance with the Vasojević tribe and strengthen ties between Serbia and Montenegro. Accompanied by Hadži-Prodan and 700 men, they initially made significant progress; however, Hadži-Prodan prematurely withdrew, leaving the wounded behind and returning to Serbia. In June, Čolak-Anta and Ljevajac led a group of fighters from Šumadija to the Morača Monastery to coordinate efforts with Herzegovinian insurgents against Ottoman forces. Their mission aimed to rally local support and prepare for an advance on the nearby town of Kolašin.

From the monastery, they wrote to Bishop Petar I Petrović-Njegoš, Prince Bishop of Montenegro, on 23 June 1809, informing him that Karađorđe was approaching the region with his army and planning an assault on Kolašin. They requested the bishop's assistance in rallying the people of Piva and Christian communities near Pljevlja to join the campaign. The letter concluded with a rallying call to the Montenegrins, urging them to seize the opportunity for unity and glory.

Montenegrins, grey falcons, Here comes fortune, sent by God, To show your heroic deeds, To seize great profit and gain, And to attain eternal glory! To unite with your brothers, To bring honour to your homeland.

— Čolak-Anta's appeal to Brotherhood,

In late June 1809, Bishop Petar responded to Čolak-Anta by inviting him to discuss and coordinate plans. According to historian Andrija Luburić, the true purpose of the invitation was to dissuade the rebels from attacking Kolašin. Čolak-Anta accepted the bishop’s request and travelled with his company through Rovca and Nikšićka Župa, eventually reaching Planinica, the mountain peak near Nikšić, where he met with Bishop Petar, the Highlander tribes (Brdska plemena), (Note: Brdska plemena ("Highlander tribes") refers to seven tribes from the region of Brda in Montenegro which share a common geographical and historical identity: Bjelopavlići, Bratonožići, Kuči, Piperi, Morača, Rovca, and Vasojevići.) and Montenegrins.

At the time, the Ottoman-held town of Nikšić was under siege by rebellious Herzegovinian tribes. The town was isolated, with the nearest Ottoman-controlled settlement more than 50 kilometres away, resembling, according to Luburić, "a Turkish island in a Serbian sea." During their meeting, Čolak-Anta criticised Bishop Petar and the Montenegrins for their passivity while the Herzegovinians fought alone to besiege Nikšić. He urged the bishop to unite with the Herzegovinians, Montenegrins, and Highlander tribes in an assault on the city, offering to lead the first attack with his Serbian contingent. The Bjelopavlići and Pješivci tribes supported Čolak-Anta’s proposal, compelling Bishop Petar to reluctantly agree.

The assault on Nikšić began, but Bishop Petar and the Montenegrins chose to remain as observers rather than actively participate. According to Luburić, Bishop Petar’s reluctance hindered efforts to secure broader cooperation against Ottoman forces, exposed the Bjelopavlići to significant losses, and allowed the Turks to prevail. Contemporary accounts report that the Turks took 124 Serbian heads that day. The Bjelopavlići suffered particularly heavy losses, including their standard-bearer, Zrno Stankov Šaranović.

The Montenegrins’ lack of support nearly escalated into open conflict between the Bjelopavlići and the Montenegrins. Abbot Đorđije Vujadinović, a clergyman and prominent mountain warrior, accused Bishop Petar of betrayal. In a heated moment, he even fired a rifle at the bishop. This incident underscores the divisions and mistrust among the Serbian and Montenegrin factions during the uprising. Despite Čolak-Anta’s efforts to unify the forces and lead the attack, the lack of cooperation resulted in significant losses and strained relations between the Herzegovinians, Bjelopavlići, and Montenegrins. Karađorđe’s advance towards Montenegro and the northern regions of Kosovo was interrupted by the Serbian insurgents' defeat at the Battle of Kamenica near Niš and the news that advancing Ottoman forces threatened Deligrad. In response, Karađorđe ordered all voivodes to abandon the newly conquered territories and retreat from the southwest to the north. Čolak-Anta and Ljevajac, whose path was cut off by Ottoman forces, were forced to navigate enemy-controlled territory. Narrowly avoiding capture, they eventually returned to Serbia.

== Leadership and governance ==
In 1811, during a period of significant reorganisation within the insurgent leadership, the Serbian government formalised its administration by appointing ministers and establishing a structured governance system. On 3 July 1811, Čolak-Anta Simeunović was officially appointed Duke of Kruševac (Vojvoda), a position that underscored his importance within the rebellion and his ability to manage liberated territories.

== Exile and return to Serbia ==
The withdrawal of Russian troops following the Treaty of Bucharest in 1812 allowed the Ottomans to concentrate on the Serbian rebels without outside interference. Three Ottoman armies converged on Serbia on three fronts and, in 1813, Serbia fell back under Ottoman control. In October 1813, Karađorđe fled to Austria and many of the leaders of the Uprising were compelled to retreat across the Danube. Čolak-Anta left for Timișoara, where he reported to the Timișoara command. Once permission was granted for Serbian dukes to leave for Russia, Čolak-Anta and his family departed on 17 September 1814, travelling through Transylvania (Erdelj) to their final destination. The family settled in Chișinău, (then part of Imperial Russia) receiving a stipend from the Russian government, a customary provision for Serbian dukes in exile. Later, by order of Tsar Alexander I, Čolak-Anta’s elder son, Konstantin (Kosta), was admitted to the 1st Cadet Corps in St. Petersburg to pursue a military education. Čolak-Anta remained in exile in Hotin, Bessarabia, until his return to Serbia in 1830 with other dukes loyal to Karađorđe.

Upon his return, Čolak-Anta transitioned to public service under Prince Miloš Obrenović. He became a member of the district court, reflecting his integration into Serbia’s governance during its early stages of state-building. By 1835, he was serving in law enforcement in Čačak, where he contributed to maintaining order and ensuring the implementation of legal authority. He was a member of the Požega Nahija court, based in Čačak, where he and his family lived. He later moved to Kruševac in 1844 to follow his son Kosta, who served as a member of the court. In 1848, following Kosta's sudden death, he moved to Kragujevac with his daughter-in-law and grandchildren. His later years were spent living between Kruševac and Kragujevac, supported by a pension of 140 thalers, which was granted to him in 1835. He died in Kragujevac in 1853 at the age of 76.

== Family and descendants ==
Čolak-Anta Simeonović's descendants included numerous prominent figures. With his first wife Jelena, he had a son, Konstantin, and five daughters, while with his second wife Stoja, he had a son, Paul.

Konstantin married Jovanka Mitrović, a descendant of medieval Serbian nobility, had male descendants who attended the Military Academy and served as distinguished officers in the Serbian army. These included Lt. Colonel Lazar Čolak-Antić (1839–1877), commander of the Morava Division during the Serbian-Ottoman Wars (1876–1878). Lazar’s daughter, Milica, married Vladislav F. Ribnikar, the founder of Politika. Another notable descendant was Colonel Ilija Čolak-Antić (1836–1894), commander of the Ibar Army, who married Jelena Matić, daughter of Minister Dimitrije Matić. Their children included Dr. Boško Čolak-Antić (1871–1949), Marshal of King Petar I's Court, diplomat of the Kingdom of Yugoslavia; and Division General Vojin Čolak-Antić (1877–1945), Chief Inspector of Cavalry and Commander of the Order of the Légion d'Honneur. Vojin married Marija Grujić, daughter of Sava Grujić, a five-time Prime Minister of Serbia. They had a daughter Simonida and three sons: Cavalry Colonel Ilija Čolak-Antić (1905–1974), Cavalry Major Grujica Čolak-Antić (1906–1967); and Cavalry Lt. Colonel Petar Čolak-Antić (1907–1964).

From Paul Čolak-Antić’s lineage came Colonel Milivoje Čolak-Antić (1884–1944), a recipient of the Order of Karađorđe's Star and a Chetnik commander during the Balkan Wars. His sister, Milica Krstić (1887–1964), became one of the most significant female architects in early 20th-century Serbia and Yugoslavia. The family also included notable figures such as Ljubica Marić, a celebrated composer, and Mihailo Naumović, a lieutenant colonel in the General Staff.

== Legacy ==
A portrait of Čolak-Anta is preserved in the National Museum of Serbia in Belgrade. Streets in Savski Venac, Belgrade, and Kruševac, central Serbia, bear his name. In the 2004 Serbian documentary-fiction television series In the footsteps of Karađorđe (Трагом Карађорђа) Čolak-Anta was portrayed by actor Slobodan Custić.

== See also ==
List of Serbian Revolutionaries
