= List of ambassadors of Serbia to Sweden =

List of Serbian ambassadors to Sweden

Ambassador of Serbia to Sweden
- Амбасадор Србије у Шведској
- Greater coat of arms of Serbia
- Incumbent; Jelena Čukić Matić since 2025
- Ministry of Foreign Affairs
- Style: His/Her Excellency
- Residence: Stockholm, Sweden
- Nominator: Government
- Appointer: President of the Republic
- Inaugural holder: Boško Čolak-Antić
- Formation: 1918
- Website: Serbian Embassy in Sweden

The Ambassador of Serbia to Sweden is the official diplomatic representative of the Republic of Serbia to the Kingdom of Sweden. The ambassador leads the Serbian diplomatic mission in Stockholm and is responsible for managing Serbia's bilateral relations with Sweden.

The post has existed in various forms since 1918, including the Kingdom of Serbs, Croats, and Slovenes (later renamed to the Kingdom of Yugoslavia), the Federal People's Republic of Yugoslavia (later renamed to the Socialist Federal Republic of Yugoslavia), the Federal Republic of Yugoslavia (later renamed to the State Union of Serbia and Montenegro), and the modern Republic of Serbia.

== List of representatives ==
Envoys of the Kingdom of Serbs, Croats, and Slovenes / Kingdom of Yugoslavia

- 1918–1920: Boško Čolak-Antić

No diplomatic representation from 1941 to 1945 due to World War II

Ambassadors of the Federal People's Republic of Yugoslavia / Socialist Federal Republic of Yugoslavia

Ambassadors of the Federal Republic of Yugoslavia / State Union of Serbia and Montenegro

Ambassadors of the Republic of Serbia

- 2025–present: Jelena Čukić Matić

== See also ==
- Foreign relations of Serbia
- Serbia–Sweden relations

== Notes ==
1. In diplomatic records his name is attested as Dr. B. Tcholak-Antitch
