= List of ambassadors of Serbia to Bulgaria =

List of Serbian ambassadors to Bulgaria

Ambassador of Serbia to Bulgaria
- Амбасадор Србије у Бугарској
- Greater coat of arms of Serbia
- Incumbent; Milan Ravić since 2023
- Ministry of Foreign Affairs
- Style: His/Her Excellency
- Residence: Sofia, Bulgaria
- Nominator: Government
- Appointer: President of the Republic
- Inaugural holder: Sava Grujić
- Formation: 1879
- Website: Serbian Embassy in Bulgaria

The Ambassador of Serbia to Bulgaria is the official diplomatic representative of the Republic of Serbia to the Republic of Bulgaria. The ambassador leads the Serbian diplomatic mission and is responsible for managing and strengthening the bilateral relations between the two neighbouring countries.

The diplomatic mission was first established in 1879 during the Principality of Serbia period, shortly after Bulgaria gained autonomy from the Ottoman Empire. The role has continued through various political transformations, including the Kingdom of Serbia, the Kingdom of Serbs, Croats, and Slovenes (later renamed to the Kingdom of Yugoslavia), the Federal People's Republic of Yugoslavia (later renamed to the Socialist Federal Republic of Yugoslavia), the Federal Republic of Yugoslavia (later renamed to the State Union of Serbia and Montenegro), and the modern Republic of Serbia.

Diplomatic relations between Serbia and Bulgaria have experienced interruptions and changes reflective of the turbulent history of the Balkans. The initial envoy was appointed soon after Serbia's independence, highlighting early diplomatic engagement. Throughout the 20th century, the post evolved from envoys to fully accredited ambassadors, mirroring the development of modern diplomatic protocols. Notably, during the world wars and periods of political upheaval in both countries, diplomatic representation was limited or suspended.

== List of representatives ==
Envoys of the Principality of Serbia

- 1879–1882: Sava Grujić

Envoys of the Kingdom of Serbia

- 1882–1884: Đorđe Simić
- 1884–1889: Rista Danić
- 1889–1896: Dimitrije Bodi
- 1896–1900: Milan Mihailović
- 1900–1901: Jovan Đaja
- 1901–1903: Pavle Marinković
- 1903–1904: Boško Čolak-Antić
- 1904–1911: Svetislav Simić
- 1911–1913: Miroslav Spalajković
- 1914–1915: Boško Čolak-Antić

No diplomatic representation from 1915 to 1920 due to World War I

Envoys of the Kingdom of Serbs, Croats, and Slovenes

- 1920–1921: Jevrem Tadić
- 1921–1927: Milan Rakić
- 1927–1930: Ljubomir Nešić

Envoys of the Kingdom of Yugoslavia

- 1930–1933: Aleksandar Vukčević
- 1934–1935: Aleksandar Cincar-Marković
- 1936–1940: Momčilo Jurišić Šturm
- 1940–1941: Vladimir Milanović

No diplomatic representation from 1941 to 1945 due to World War II

Ambassadors of the Federal People's Republic of Yugoslavia

- 1945–1947: Nikola Kovačević
- 1948–1950: Obrad Cicmil
- 1948–1950: Josip Đerđa
- 1950–1953: Raif Dizdarević
- 1953–1957: Dimitrije Miljković
- 1957–1962: Radoš Jovanović

Ambassadors of the Socialist Federal Republic of Yugoslavia

- 1962–1963: Predrag Ajtić
- 1963–1967: Dragoslav Marković
- 1967–1971: Kiril Miljovski
- 1971–1975: Ante Drndić
- 1975–1979: Radovan Urošev
- 1979–1983: Danilo Purić
- 1983–1987: Ilija Đukić
- 1987–1992: Milenko Stefanović

Ambassadors of the Federal Republic of Yugoslavia

- 1992–1996: Srećko Đukić
- 1996–1998: Radoš Smiljković
- 1999–2001: Danko Prokić
- 2001–2003: Čedomir Radojković

Ambassadors of the State Union of Serbia and Montenegro

- 2003–2005: Čedomir Radojković
- 2005–2006: Danilo Vučetić

Ambassadors of the Republic of Serbia

- 2006–2009: Danilo Vučetić
- 2009–2013: Aleksandar Crkvenjakov
- 2013–2019: Vladimir Ćurguz
- 2019–2023: Željko Jović
- 2023–present: Milan Ravić

== See also ==
- Bulgaria–Serbia relations
- Foreign relations of Serbia
