= List of ambassadors of Serbia to Egypt =

List of Serbian ambassadors to Egypt

Ambassador of Serbia to Egypt
- Амбасадор Србије у Египту
- Greater coat of arms of Serbia
- Incumbent; Miroslav Šestović since 2022
- Ministry of Foreign Affairs
- Style: His Excellency
- Residence: Cairo, Egypt
- Nominator: Government
- Appointer: President of the Republic
- Inaugural holder: Boško Čolak-Antić
- Formation: 1908

The Ambassador of Serbia to Egypt is the official diplomatic representative of the Republic of Serbia to the Arab Republic of Egypt. The ambassador leads the Serbian diplomatic mission and is responsible for managing and strengthening the bilateral relations between the two neighbouring countries.

The diplomatic mission was first established in 1908 during the Kingdom of Serbia period. The role has continued through various political transformations, including the Kingdom of Serbs, Croats, and Slovenes (later renamed to the Kingdom of Yugoslavia), the Federal People's Republic of Yugoslavia (later renamed to the Socialist Federal Republic of Yugoslavia), the Federal Republic of Yugoslavia (later renamed to the State Union of Serbia and Montenegro), and the modern Republic of Serbia.

== List of representatives ==
Diplomatic representatives of the Kingdom of Serbia

- 1908–1912: Boško Čolak-Antić
- 1914–1915: Miloš Bogićević

Envoys of the Kingdom of Serbs, Croats, and Slovenes

- 1923–1926: Dimitrije Grupčević
- 1926–1931: Jovan Dučić

Envoys of the Kingdom of Yugoslavia

- 1932–1933: Anton Novačan
- 1936–1938: Vladislav Marković
- 1938: Ivan Vukotić
- 1939–1941: Branko Adžemović
- 1941–1944: Miloje Smiljanić
- 1944: Ljubomir Hadži-Đorđević

Ambassadors of the Federal People's Republic of Yugoslavia

- 1944–1945: Milan Martinović
- 1946–1947: Ešref Badnjević
- 1949–1950: Miloš Moskovljević
- 1950–1952: Milan Ristić
- 1953–1956: Marko Nikezić
- 1956–1958: Josip Đerđa
- 1959–1961: Ratomir Dugonjić
- 1961–1963: Jože Brilej

Ambassadors of the Socialist Federal Republic of Yugoslavia

- 1963–1967: Salko Fejić
- 1967–1969: Danilo Lekić
- 1969–1973: Mihailo Javorski
- 1973–1977: Augustin Papić
- 1977–1981: Aleksandar Božović
- 1981–1985: Lazar Živulj
- 1985–1989: Milan Zupan
- 1989–1991: Ivan Iveković

Ambassadors of the Federal Republic of Yugoslavia

- 1996–2001: Dušan Simeunović

Ambassadors of the State Union of Serbia and Montenegro

- 2002–2006: Radojko Bogojević

Ambassadors of the Republic of Serbia

- 2006–2011: Dejan Vasiljević
- 2011–2017: Dragan Bisenić
- 2018–2021: Jugoslav Vukadinović
- 2022–present: Miroslav Šestović

== See also ==
- Egypt–Serbia relations
- Foreign relations of Serbia
