= List of ambassadors of Serbia to Romania =

List of Serbian ambassadors to Romania

Ambassador of Serbia to Romania
- Амбасадор Србије у Румунији
- Greater coat of arms of Serbia
- Incumbent; Stefan Tomašević since 2020
- Ministry of Foreign Affairs
- Style: His/Her Excellency
- Residence: Bucharest, Romania
- Nominator: Government
- Appointer: President of the Republic
- Inaugural holder: Boško Čolak-Antić
- Formation: 1918
- Website: Serbian Embassy in Romania

The Ambassador of Serbia to Romania is the official diplomatic representative of the Republic of Serbia to Romania. The ambassador leads the Serbian diplomatic mission in Bucharest and is responsible for managing Serbia's bilateral relations with Romania.

The post has existed in various forms since 1918, including the Kingdom of Serbs, Croats, and Slovenes (later renamed to the Kingdom of Yugoslavia), the Federal People's Republic of Yugoslavia (later renamed to the Socialist Federal Republic of Yugoslavia), the Federal Republic of Yugoslavia (later renamed to the State Union of Serbia and Montenegro), and the modern Republic of Serbia.

== List of representatives ==
Envoys of the Kingdom of Serbs, Croats, and Slovenes / Kingdom of Yugoslavia

- 1920–1935: Boško Čolak-Antić
- 1935–1936: Ninko Perić

No diplomatic representation from 1941 to 1945 due to World War II

Ambassadors of the Federal People's Republic of Yugoslavia / Socialist Federal Republic of Yugoslavia

Ambassadors of the Federal Republic of Yugoslavia / State Union of Serbia and Montenegro

Ambassadors of the Republic of Serbia

- 2020–present: Stefan Tomašević

== See also ==
- Foreign relations of Serbia
- Romania–Serbia relations

== Notes ==
1. In diplomatic records his name is attested as Dr. B. Tcholak-Antitch
