= Aleksandar Dimitrijević =

Serbian military man

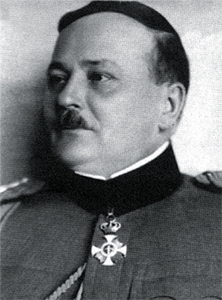
- Marshal of the Court with the rank of Brigadier General in 1929
- Born: February 6, 1884; Niš, Kingdom of Serbia
- Died: September 3, 1963 (aged 79); New York City, United States
- Military career
- Allegiance: Kingdom of Serbia → Kingdom of Yugoslavia
- Branch: Royal Yugoslav Army
- Service years: 1905–1934, 1941
- Rank: Divisional General
- Unit: Guard of the Royal Yugoslav Army
- Commands: Marshal of the Court (Yugoslavia)
- Conflicts: Balkan Wars; World War I World War II
- Awards: Order of Karađorđe's Star with Swords, 4th Class (twice)

Aleksandar Dimitrijević (February 6, 1884 – September 3, 1963) was a high-ranking officer in the Serbian Army and a Divisional General in the Royal Yugoslav Army. He participated in the Balkan Wars, World War I, and World War II.

Dimitrijević served as Marshal of the Court (Yugoslavia) to King Alexander I Karađorđević, who was the best man at his wedding and godfather to all three of his children. He was a prominent member of the secretive White Hand organization.

== Life and career ==
Aleksandar Dimitrijević was born on February 6, 1884, in Niš, to father Radovan, a treasurer at the Monopoly Administration and a Member of Parliament in the Kingdom of Serbia, and mother Stana Dimitrijević. He began his military career as a cadet of the 34th class of the Lower Military Academy, later continuing his education in the 19th class of the Higher Military Academy.

During the Balkan Wars (1912–1913), fought by the Kingdom of Serbia, he served as a platoon leader and battery commander in the Danube Artillery Regiment.

During World War I, from 1914 to 1917, he was the commander of the 3rd Battery of the 1st Division of the Danube Artillery Regiment. From 1917 to 1920, he served as an orderly officer to Regent Alexander, after which he went to France for further training. He did internships in Grenoble and Nancy during 1921.

In 1921, he worked as a Tactics instructor at the Lower School of the Military Academy. In March 1926, he was appointed military attaché in Paris.

From April 1927 to October 1934, he served as Marshal of the Court to King Alexander I Karađorđević. In this role, he was also a member of the secret organization White Hand, where he had significant influence over the selection of individuals in the country’s military and political leadership. In 1933, he rejected the request of Chetnik associations to come under the command of the Ministry of the Army and Navy.

He was promoted to the rank of Captain in 1912, Major in 1915, Colonel in 1924, Brigadier General in 1929, and Divisional General in 1934.

He was the recipient of many honors, including the Order of Karađorđe's Star with Swords, 4th Class (twice).

In 1924, he married Savka, the daughter of Dimitrije Živadinović, a merchant from Belgrade and Chairman of the Board of the Belgrade Cooperative. They had a daughter, Milica (an anthropologist), who worked at the Museum of Anthropology in New York, and a son, Petar (an economist), who graduated from Harvard University King Alexander I Karađorđević was both the best man at Aleksandar and Savka’s wedding and later the godfather to their children. Their youngest son, Pavle, died during tank training in the Yugoslav People's Army in 1945.

He died on September 3, 1963, in New York. His remains were transferred to the family tomb at the New Cemetery in Belgrade.

== Literature ==
- Bjelajac, Mile S. (2004). Generals and Admirals of the Kingdom of Yugoslavia 1918–1941. Belgrade: Institute for Recent History of Serbia. ISBN 978-86-7005-039-6. Available at: vojnaknjizara.com
- Bjelajac, Mile S. (1994). The Army of the Kingdom of SHS/Yugoslavia 1922–1935. Belgrade: Institute for Recent History of Serbia.
- The Great War of Serbia for the Liberation and Unification of Serbs, Croats, and Slovenes: 1914–1918, Vol. 29. Belgrade: General Staff Headquarters, 1937. COBISS.SR 136702727. Available at: cobiss.net
- Opačić, Petar (1984). Serbia and the Salonika Front. Belgrade: Književne Novine. COBISS.SR 1024070071. Available at cobiss.net
