= Divisional general (Kingdom of Yugoslavia) =

Divisional general Divizijski đeneral
- Rank flag

- Cuff insignia
- Country: Kingdom of Yugoslavia
- Service branch: Royal Yugoslav Army; Royal Yugoslav Army Air Force
- Rank: General officer
- NATO rank code: OF-8
- Formation: 1923
- Abolished: 1945
- Next higher rank: Army general
- Next lower rank: Brigadier general
- Equivalent ranks: Vice admiral

Divisional general (Serbian: Divizijski đeneral) was a military rank of the Kingdom of Yugoslavia, in existence from 1923 to 1945. It was introduced by the Law on the Organization of the Army and Navy from 19 July 1923. In order to be promoted to divisional general, a Royal Yugoslav Army officer had previously to have finished higher Military Academy, had successfully commanded with brigade area or similar division formation at least one year, while a Royal Yugoslav Army Air Force officer had to command air force brigades. The rank was used for army and air force officers, while the Royal Yugoslav Navy had its own rank of Vice admiral that was equal to divisional general.
