= Miroslav Spalajković =

Jurist and diplomat from Yugoslavia (1869–1952)

His Excellency Miroslav Spalajković
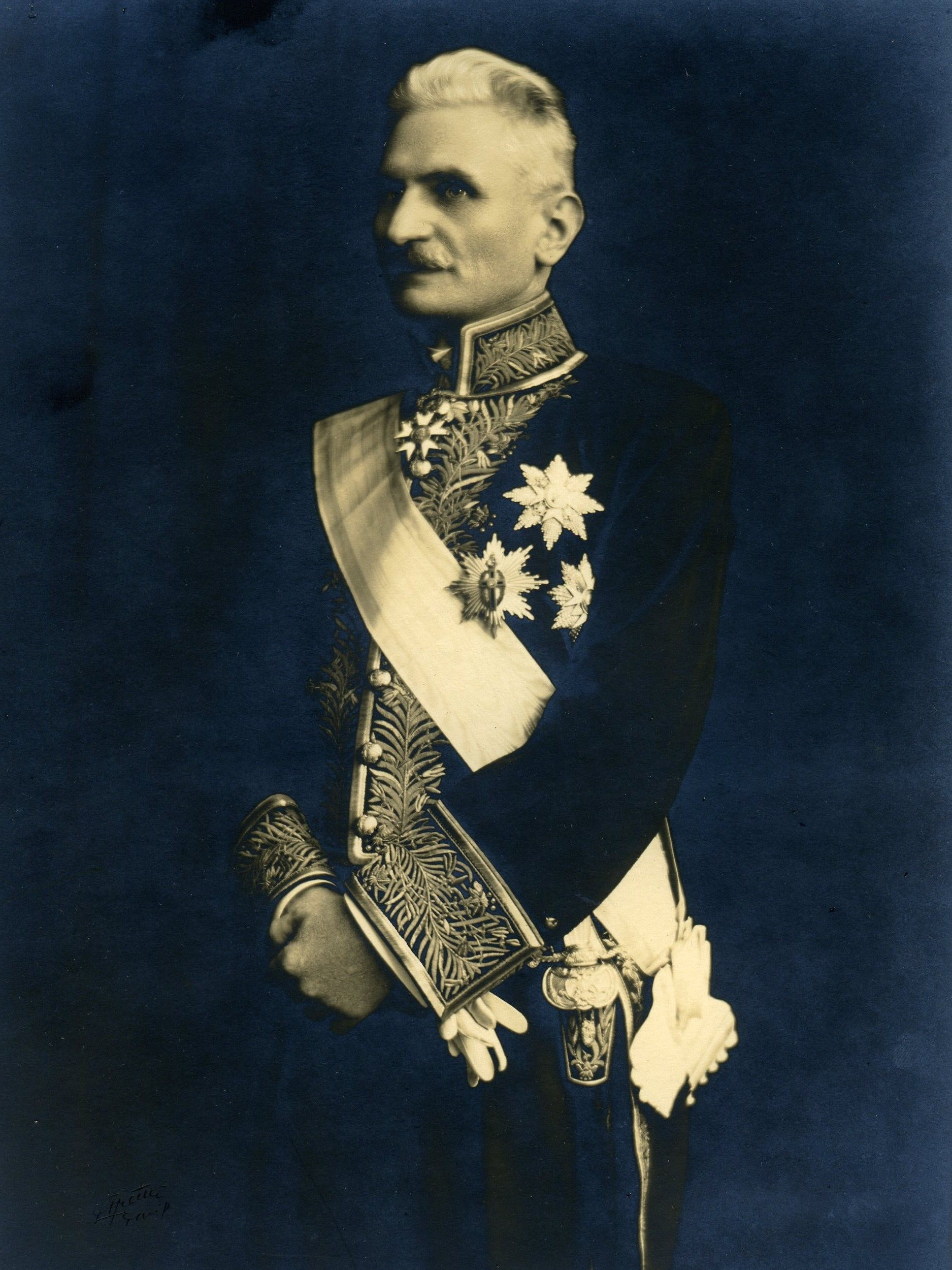

Envoy of the Kingdom of Serbia to the Russian Empire
- In office 1913–1919

Envoy of the Kingdom of Serbia to the Kingdom of Bulgaria
- In office 1911–1913

Personal details
- Born: 18 April 1869 Kragujevac, Principality of Serbia
- Died: 4 February 1951 (aged 81) Sèvres, France
- Relatives: Son-in-law of Bosnian-Serb political leader Gligorije Jeftanović, brother-in-law of future Yugoslavian Prime Minister Milan Srškić (1932–1934)
- Education: University of Paris
- Occupation: Diplomat

Miroslav Spalajković (18 April 1869 – 4 February 1951) was a Serbian diplomat, best known for his actions as the envoy to the Russian Empire in Saint Petersburg during the July Crisis of the summer of 1914. An outspoken opponent of Austria-Hungary, Spalajković's public statements to Russian media denied any Serbian culpability in the assassination of Archduke Franz Ferdinand of Austria and his reports back to the Serbian government guaranteed Russian military support. While Tsar Nicholas II and much of the Russian leadership was committed to Serbian autonomy, no Russian leader actually guaranteed Spalajković or Serbia of Russian military support during the July Crisis. Spalajković's optimistic telegrams, largely based on public demonstrations and uncorroborated discussion, reassured the Serbian government that they could risk an Austro-Hungarian military attack. Without Spalajković's guarantee of Russian support, some historians argue that Serbian Prime Minister Nikola Pašić would have ultimately yielded to Austrian demands, thereby avoiding the sequence of events that led to the First World War.

In 1922, he was appointed ambassador of the Kingdom of Serbs, Croats and Slovenes to France and remained stationed in Paris until 1935.
