= Sebenje =

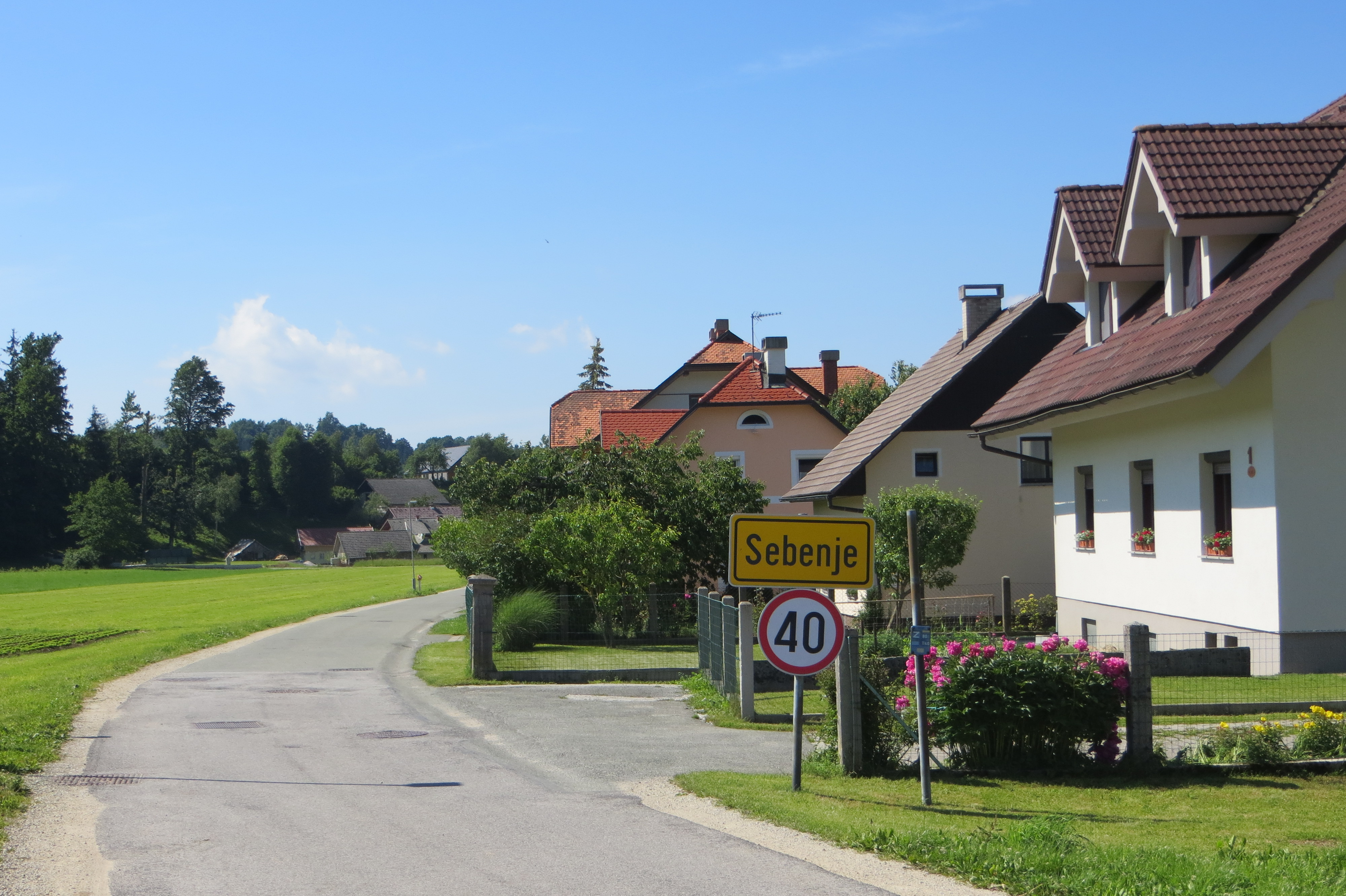

- Location in Slovenia
- Coordinates: 46°19′53.35″N 14°17′55.98″E
- Country: Slovenia
- Traditional region: Upper Carniola
- Statistical region: Upper Carniola
- Municipality: Tržič
- Elevation: 492.9 m (1,617 ft)

Population (2002)
  - Total: 376

Sebenje (pronounced [sɛˈbeːnjɛ]; German: Sebeine) is a settlement in the Municipality of Tržič in the Upper Carniola region of Slovenia.

== Geography ==
Sebenje is a scattered village in a level area along the road from Žiganja Vas to Križe nestled against the western Miocene foothills of the Udin Woods (Slovene: Udin boršt). Next to the Udin Woods, the soil is loamy and swampy. The land east and southeast of the village is forested. There are several springs and creeks northeast of the village. The Križe Basin (Slovene: Kriško polje) lies to the west, toward the Tržič Bistrica River.

== History ==
Before the Second World War, making shoes was the major economic activity in the village. Other residents made a living farming or working at factories in Tržič. Until a water main was installed in the village in 1942, supplied by a catchwater at Zgornje Vetrno, cisterns were used for water.
