= Hušica =

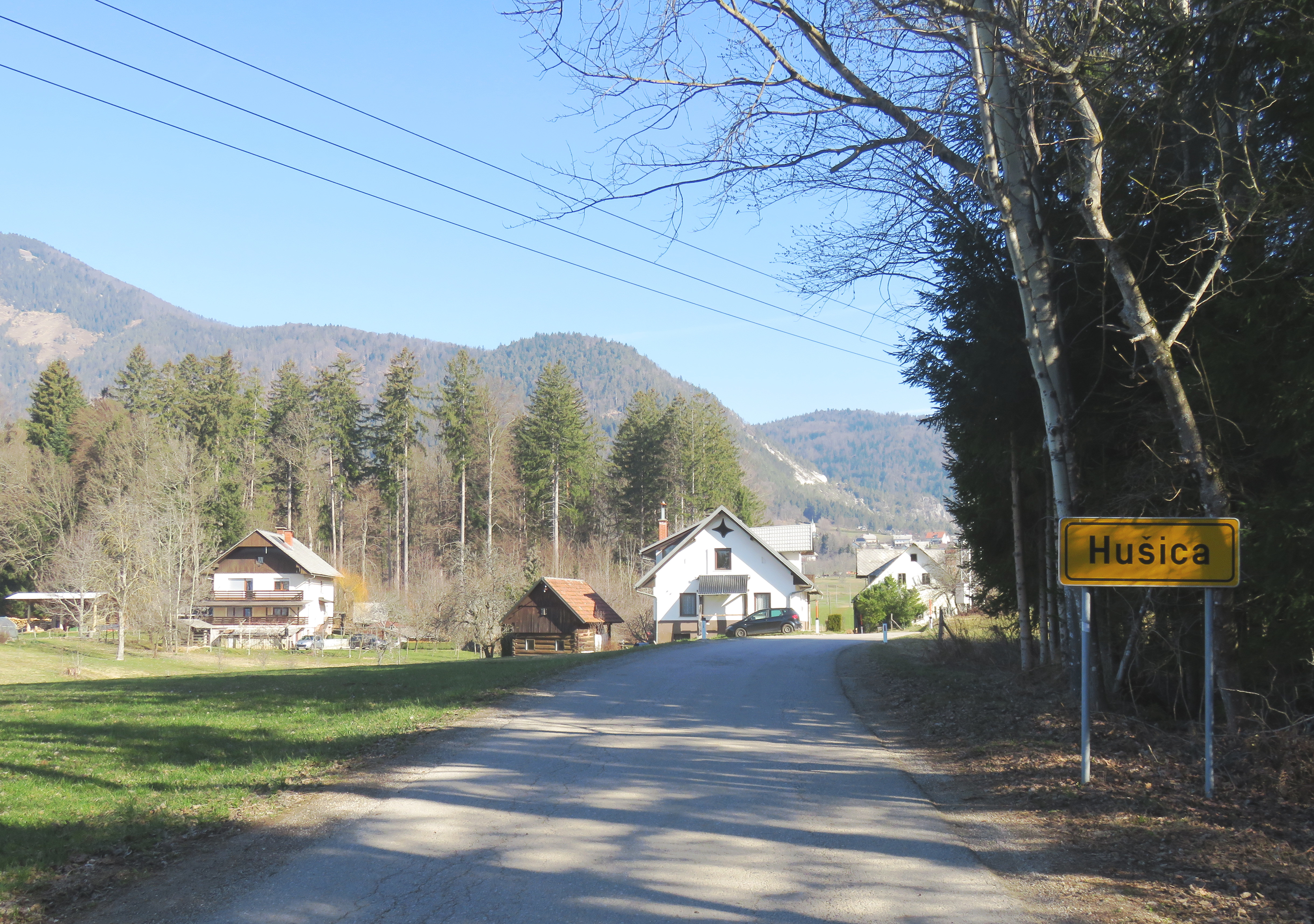

- Location in Slovenia
- Coordinates: 46°20′48.52″N 14°16′13.15″E
- Country: Slovenia
- Traditional region: Upper Carniola
- Statistical region: Upper Carniola
- Municipality: Tržič
- Elevation: 587.3 m (1,927 ft)

Population (2002)
  - Total: 4

Hušica (pronounced [ˈxuːʃitsa]) is a small settlement in the Municipality of Tržič in the Upper Carniola region of Slovenia.

== Geography ==
Hušica consists of three farms on the ridge of a hill on the edge of mixed forest along the road from Brezje pri Tržiču to Kovor. There is a cold spring west of the village near Strašnik Creek.

== Name ==
The name Hušica is pronounced Hušca in the local dialect. It is a diminutive of the name of Hudo (via *Hujšica), a larger neighboring village.
