= Palovice =

Palovice may refer to:

- Pálovice, a village in the Czech Republic
- Paloviče, a settlement in Slovenia
