= Hudo =

Hudo may refer to:

- Hudo (scouting), an outdoor pit toilet

== Places in Slovenia ==
- Hudo, Domžale, a settlement in the Municipality of Domžale
- Hudo, Tržič, a settlement in the Municipality of Tržič
- Malo Hudo, a settlement in the Municipality of Ivančna Gorica (known as Hudo until 1953)
