= Slap =

Slap or slapping may refer to:

== Common use ==
- Slapping (strike), a method of striking with the palm of the hand

=== Instances of slapping ===
- George S. Patton slapping incidents
- Will Smith–Chris Rock slapping incident
- Slap (professional wrestling), an attack in professional wrestling
- Happy slapping, a British fad in the 2000s
- Power Slap, a 2023 US television show where contestants slap each other in the face

== Music ==
- Slap!, a 1990 album by English band Chumbawamba
- "Slap" (song), a 2006 song by American musician Ludacris
- Slapping (music), a musical technique used with stringed instruments

== Science ==
- Secret large-scale atmospheric program, scientific term for chemtrail conspiracy theory, a set of conspiracy theories
- Standard Light Antarctic Precipitation, a reference material for stable isotope analysis

== Other uses ==
- Saboted light armor penetrator, a family of ammunition designed to penetrate armor more efficiently than standard armor-piercing ammunition
- Slap (magazine), American skateboard magazine 1992–2008
- Slap, Tržič, a municipality in Slovenia
- SLAP tear, acronym derived from "superior labral tear from anterior to posterior", an injury to part of the shoulder blade
- SLAP, the Delhi Metro station code for Seelampur metro station, Delhi, India

== See also ==
- The Slap (disambiguation)
- Slap tagging or sticker art
- Slap tonguing, a musical technique used on wind instruments
- Strategic lawsuit against public participation, or SLAPP, a type of lawsuit
