= Potarje =

Potarje is a South Slavic toponym, which may refer to:

- Potarje, Montenegro, the native name for the region of Tara River Valley, Montenegro
- Potarje, Serbia, the native name for the region of Tara mountain, Serbia
- Potarje, Tržič, a settlement in the Municipality of Tržič, Slovenia
