= Breg ob Bistrici =

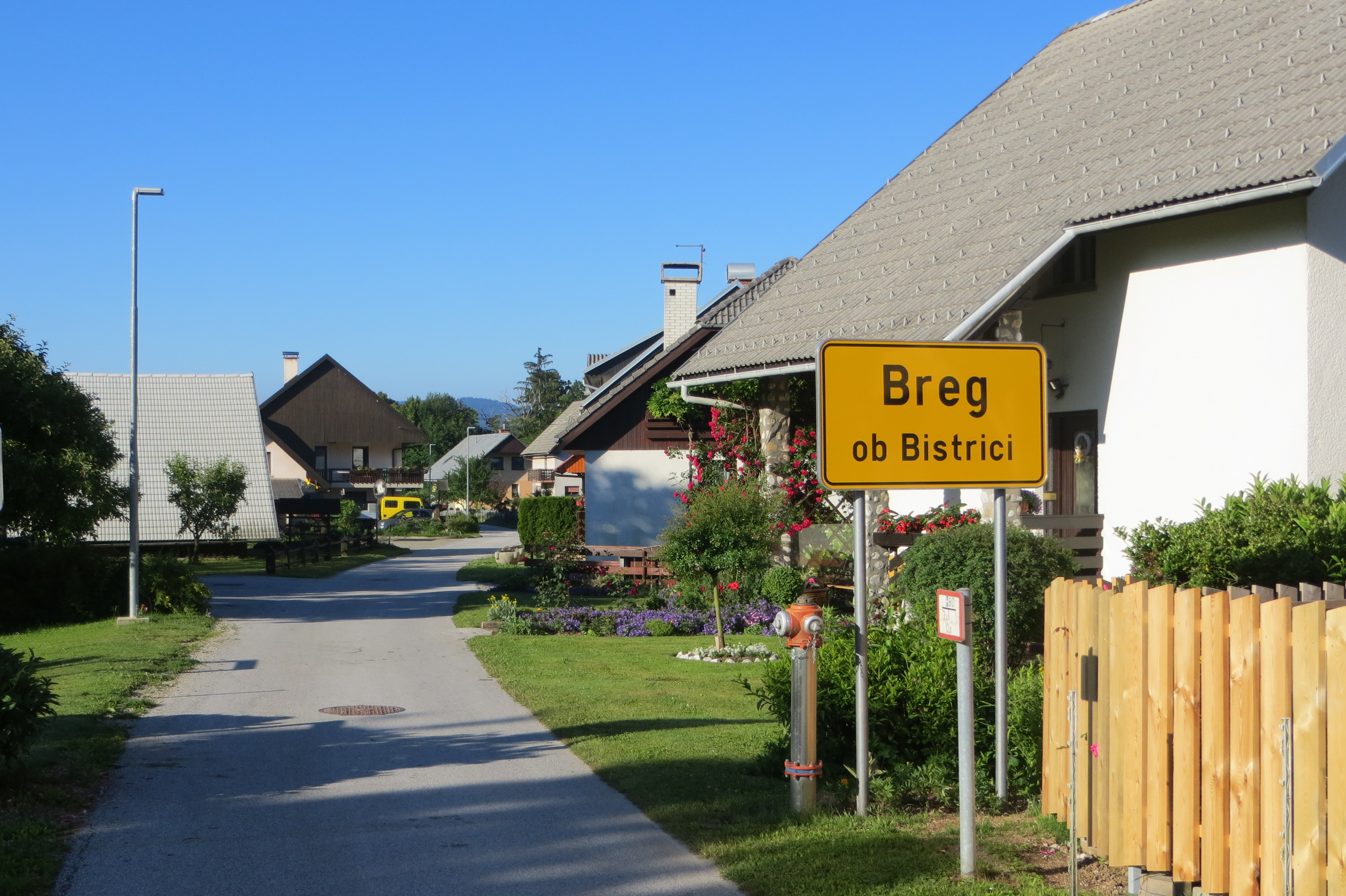

- Location in Slovenia
- Coordinates: 46°19′25.57″N 14°17′15.66″E
- Country: Slovenia
- Traditional region: Upper Carniola
- Statistical region: Upper Carniola
- Municipality: Tržič
- Elevation: 480.7 m (1,577 ft)

Population (2002)
  - Total: 57

Breg ob Bistrici (pronounced [ˈbɾeːk ɔb ˈbiːstɾitsi]) is a settlement in the Municipality of Tržič in the Upper Carniola region of Slovenia.

== Name ==
Breg ob Bistrici was attested in historical sources as Rain in 1498. The name of the settlement was changed from Breg to Breg ob Bistrici in 1953.
