= Čadovlje pri Tržiču =

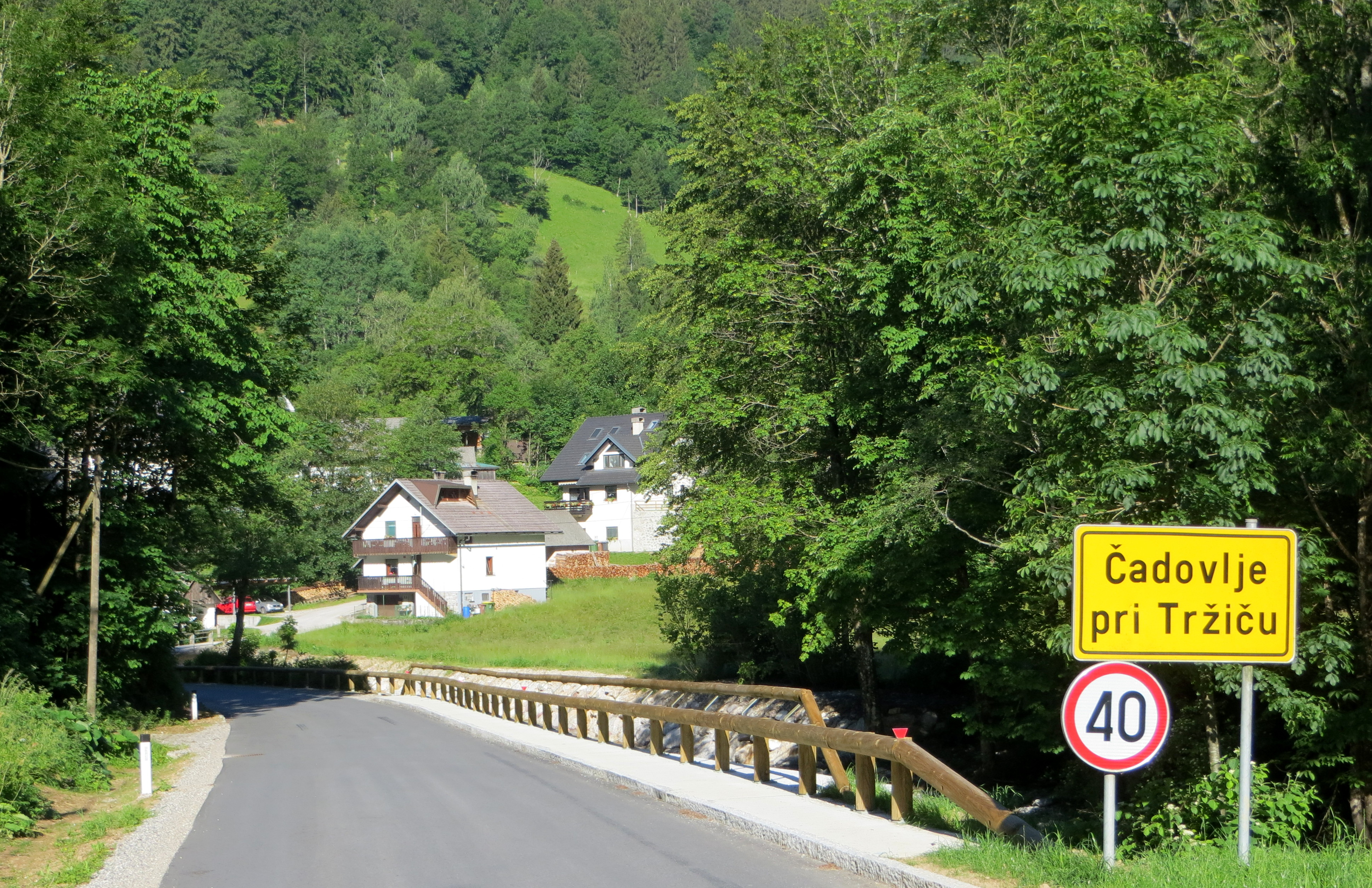

- Location in Slovenia
- Coordinates: 46°22′42.96″N 14°19′20.91″E
- Country: Slovenia
- Traditional region: Upper Carniola
- Statistical region: Upper Carniola
- Municipality: Tržič
- Elevation: 584.5 m (1,918 ft)

Population (2002)
  - Total: 86

Čadovlje pri Tržiču (pronounced [ˈtʃaːdɔu̯ljɛ pɾi təɾˈʒiːtʃu]) is a settlement in the Municipality of Tržič in the Upper Carniola region of Slovenia.

== Name ==
The name of the settlement was changed from Čadovlje to Čadovlje pri Tržiču in 1953.
