= Podljubelj =

Podljubelj Sveta Ana pod Ljubeljem (until 1955)
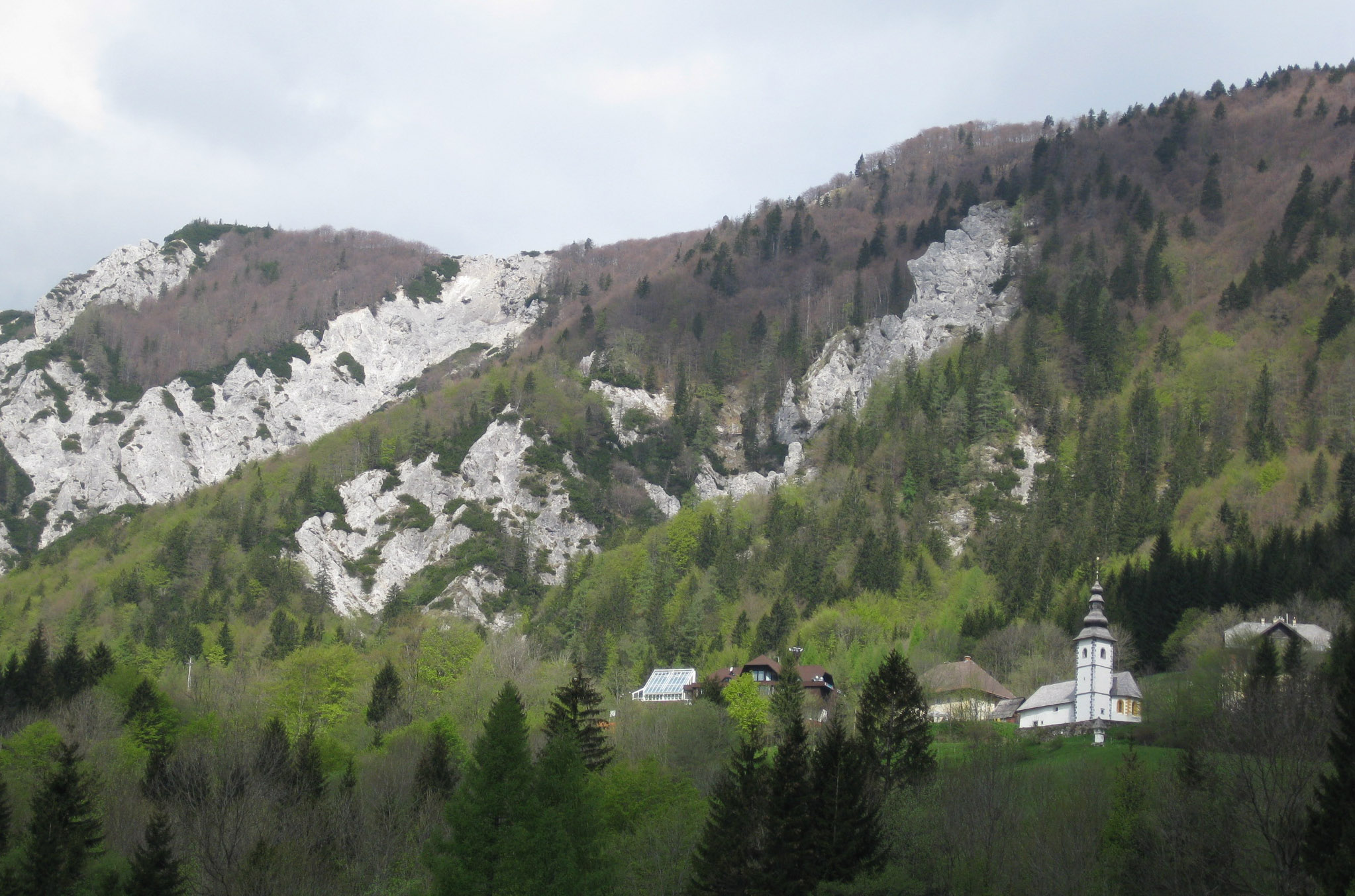

- Location in Slovenia
- Coordinates: 46°23′52.77″N 14°17′13.13″E
- Country: Slovenia
- Traditional region: Upper Carniola
- Statistical region: Upper Carniola
- Municipality: Tržič
- Elevation: 657.6 m (2,157 ft)

Population (2002)
  - Total: 703

Podljubelj (pronounced [ˈpoːdljubɛl] or [pɔdljuˈbeːl]; German: Sankt Anna) is a settlement on the road to the Ljubelj Pass in the Municipality of Tržič in the Upper Carniola region of Slovenia.

== Name ==
The name of the settlement was changed from Sveta Ana pod Ljubeljem (literally, 'Saint Anne below Ljubelj') to Podljubelj (literally, 'below Ljubelj') in 1955. The name was changed on the basis of the 1948 Law on Names of Settlements and Designations of Squares, Streets, and Buildings as part of efforts by Slovenia's postwar communist government to remove religious elements from toponyms. In the past the German name was Sankt Anna.

== Church ==
The local church, dedicated to Saint Anne, stands right by the entrance to the Ljubelj Tunnel.

== Tominc Falls ==
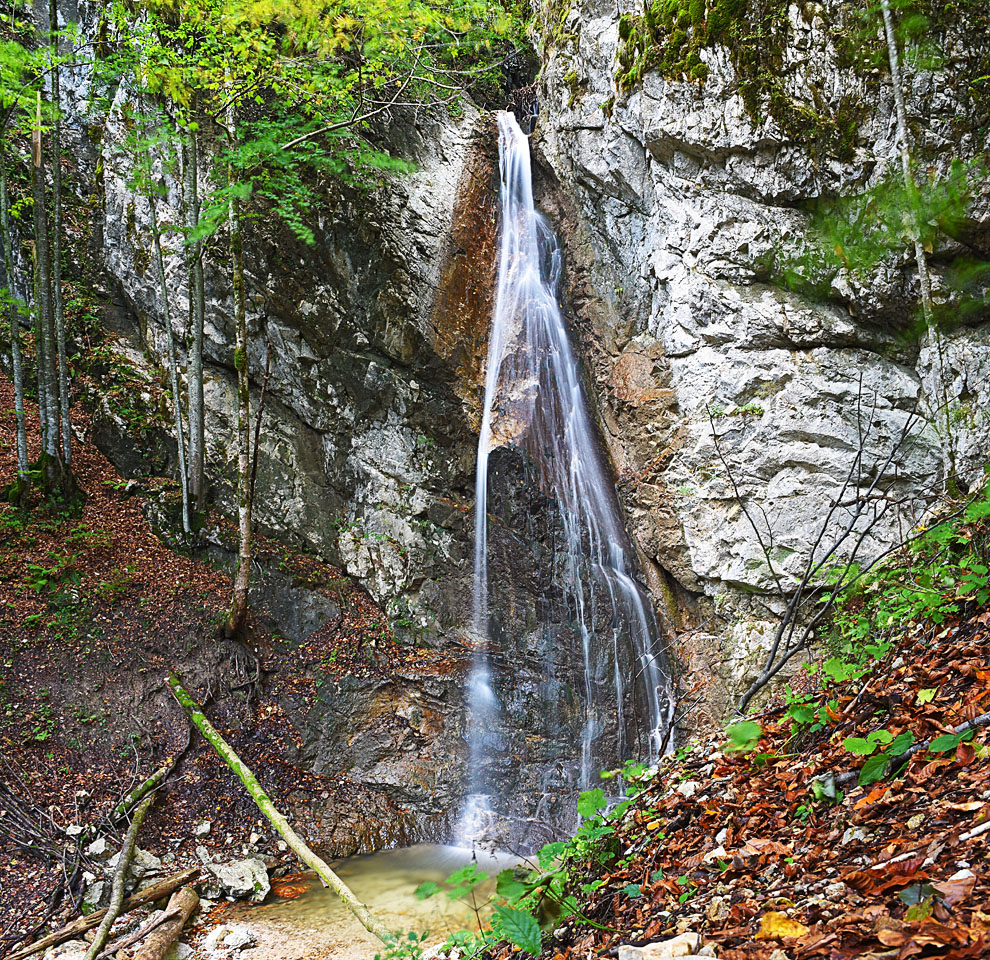
Tominc Falls

On White Creek (Slovene: Beli potok), a right tributary of Mošenik Creek, there is an easily reachable 18-meter (59 ft) waterfall called Tominc Falls (Slovene: Tominčev slap). It is a tourist attraction during high-flow conditions.

== Mine ==
In the hamlet of Lajba above the village is an abandoned cinnabar mine called Saint Anne's Mine (Slovene: Šentanski rudnik) and parts of it have been made accessible to visitors.
