= Visoče, Tržič =

Visoče
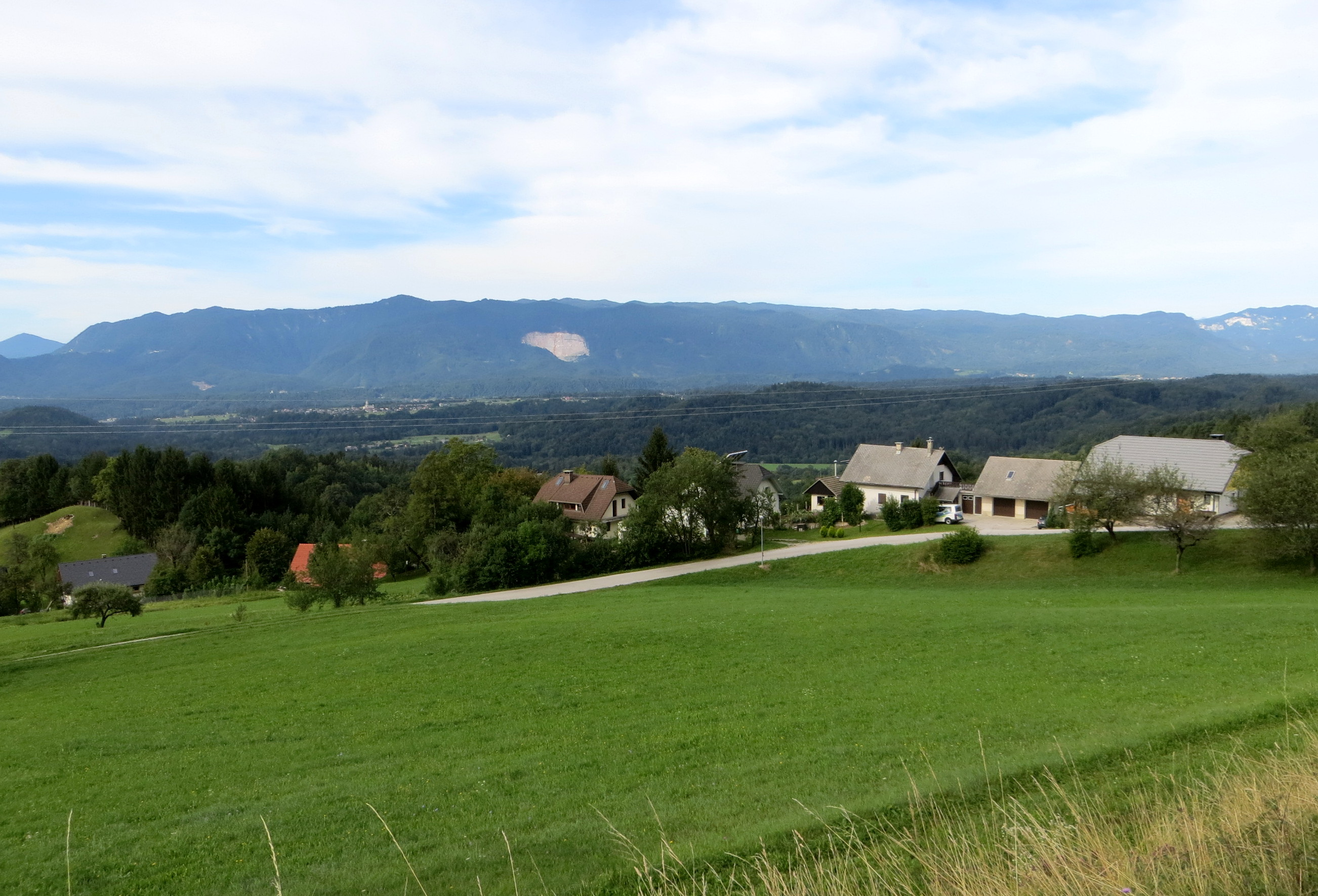

- Location in Slovenia
- Coordinates: 46°21′28.1″N 14°15′48.46″E
- Country: Slovenia
- Traditional region: Upper Carniola
- Statistical region: Upper Carniola
- Municipality: Tržič
- Elevation: 629.3 m (2,065 ft)

Population (2002)
  - Total: 80

Visoče (pronounced [ʋiˈsɔːtʃɛ]) is a settlement in the Municipality of Tržič in the Upper Carniola region of Slovenia.
