= Grahovše =

- Location in Slovenia
- Coordinates: 46°22′1.72″N 14°20′59.63″E
- Country: Slovenia
- Traditional region: Upper Carniola
- Statistical region: Upper Carniola
- Municipality: Tržič
- Elevation: 806.2 m (2,645 ft)

Population (2002)
  - Total: 131

Grahovše (pronounced [ˈɡɾaːxɔu̯ʃɛ]) is a settlement in the Municipality of Tržič in the Upper Carniola region of Slovenia.

== Name ==
The name Grahovše is believed to derive from the earlier form *Grahovišče, which as a common noun refers to a place where peas are grown.
