= Pristava, Tržič =

Pristava
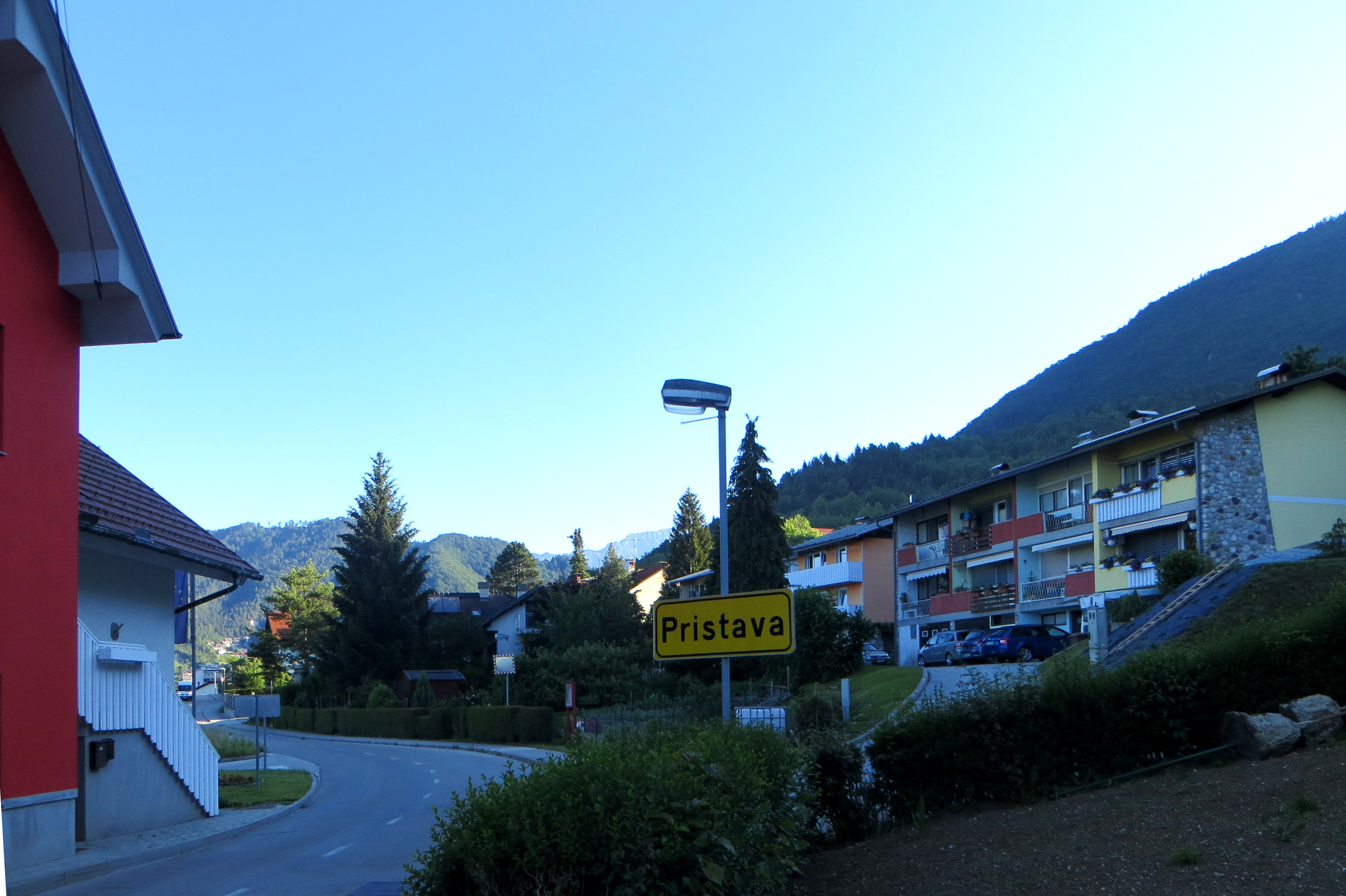

- Location in Slovenia
- Coordinates: 46°20′53.53″N 14°17′46.79″E
- Country: Slovenia
- Traditional region: Upper Carniola
- Statistical region: Upper Carniola
- Municipality: Tržič
- Elevation: 516.4 m (1,694 ft)

Population (2002)
  - Total: 912

Pristava (pronounced [pɾiˈstaːʋa]) is a settlement in the Municipality of Tržič in the Upper Carniola region of Slovenia.
