= Zvirče =

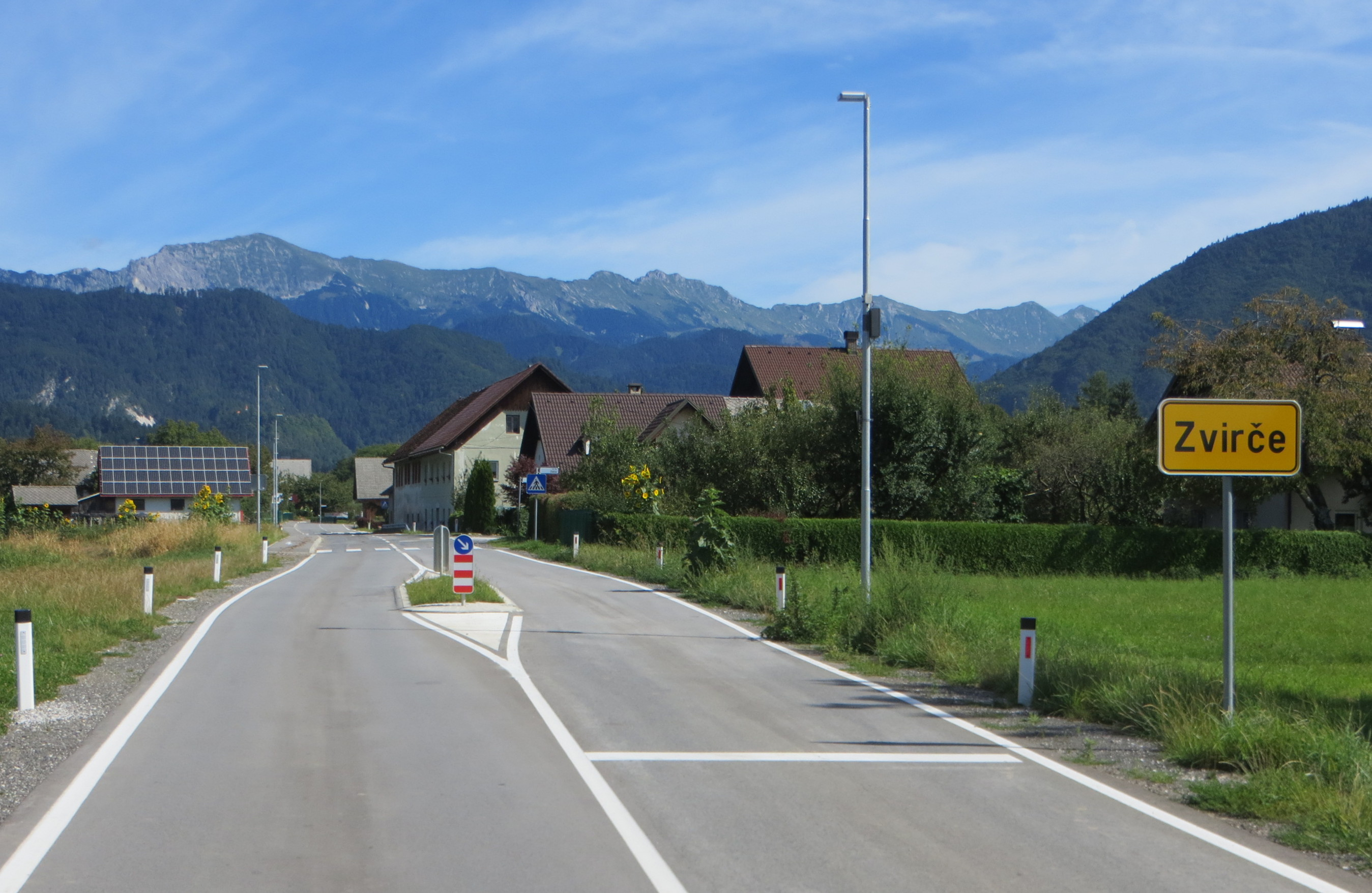

- Location in Slovenia
- Coordinates: 46°19′49.09″N 14°16′46.41″E
- Country: Slovenia
- Traditional region: Upper Carniola
- Statistical region: Upper Carniola
- Municipality: Tržič
- Elevation: 496.1 m (1,628 ft)

Population (2023)
  - Total: 420

Zvirče (pronounced [zʋiɾˈtʃɛ]; German: Swirtschach) is a settlement in the Municipality of Tržič in the Upper Carniola region of Slovenia. It has a population of 420.
