= The Slap =

The Slap may refer to:

- The Slap (film), 1974 French/Italian comedy film
- The Slap (novel), 2008 novel by Christos Tsiolkas
  - The Slap (Australian TV series), 2011 Australian TV series based on Tsiolkas' novel
  - The Slap (American TV series), 2015 U.S. miniseries based on Tsiolkas' novel
- "The Slap" (The Amazing World of Gumball), a television episode

== See also ==
- Slap (disambiguation)
- Will Smith–Chris Rock slapping incident
