= Novake, Tržič =

Novake
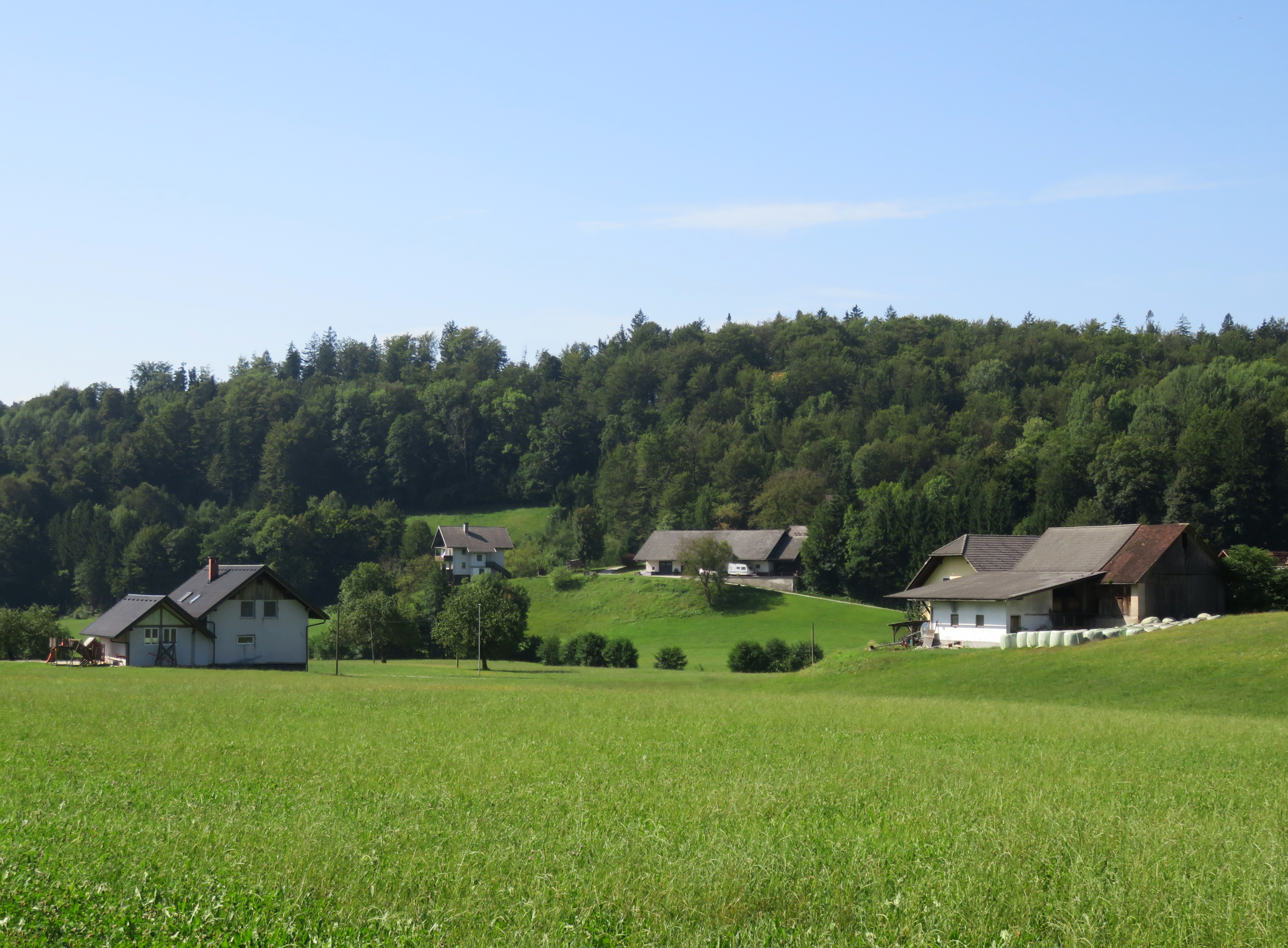

- Location in Slovenia
- Coordinates: 46°19′12.06″N 14°19′18.32″E
- Country: Slovenia
- Traditional region: Upper Carniola
- Statistical region: Upper Carniola
- Municipality: Tržič
- Elevation: 447 m (1,467 ft)

Population (2002)
  - Total: 18

Novake (pronounced [nɔˈʋaːkɛ]) is a small settlement in the Municipality of Tržič in the Upper Carniola region of Slovenia.
