= Leše, Tržič =

Leše
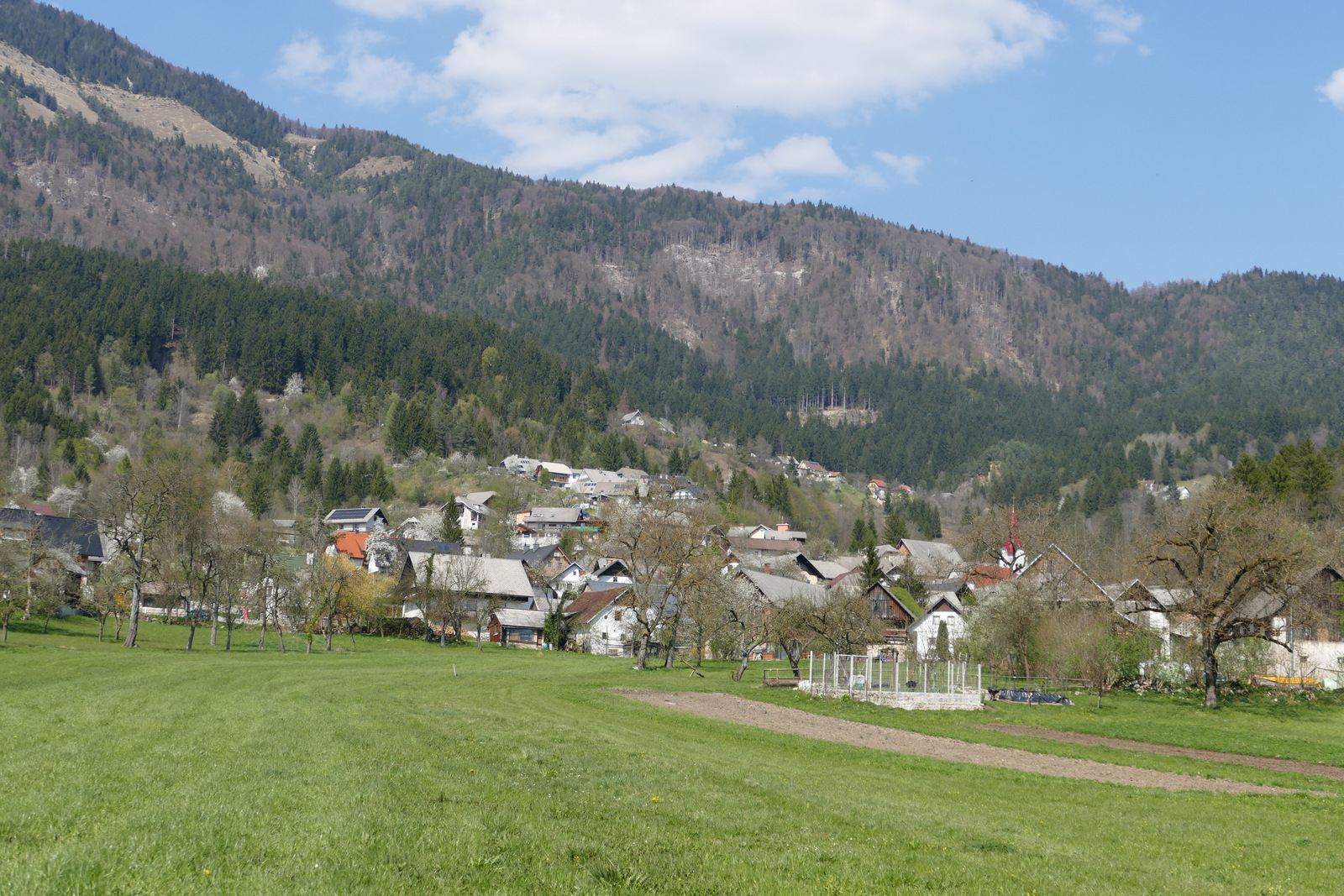

- Location in Slovenia
- Coordinates: 46°21′16.27″N 14°15′22.43″E
- Country: Slovenia
- Traditional region: Upper Carniola
- Statistical region: Upper Carniola
- Municipality: Tržič
- Elevation: 518.9 m (1,702 ft)

Population (2002)
  - Total: 210

Leše (pronounced [ˈleːʃɛ], German: Leschach) is a village in the Municipality of Tržič in the Upper Carniola region of Slovenia.

== Name ==
Leše was attested in written sources in 1040 as silva que Leschahc nuncupator (and as predium Lêscah in 1050–63, and Loschach and Leschach in 1498). The name is derived from the plural demonym Lěščane, derived from the word lěska 'hazel'. The name thus originally means 'people living by the hazel grove'.

== History ==
During the Second World War, the school in Leše was burned by the Partisans in 1944. A new school was built after the war.

The local club Slovenian Astronaut (Slovenski astronavt) has arranged a memorial room for Sunita Williams, an astronaut of Slovene descent, in Leše. Her great-grandmother Marija Bohinjec was born and lived in Leše until she emigrated to the United States in 1900 or 1901. Her birth house is still standing. An annual event called the Day of Astronautics (astronavtski dan) aimed at promoting spaceflight was organised in Leše annually from 2009 to 2016.

== Church ==
The local church is dedicated to Saint James (Slovene: sveti Jakob). It dates from 1822 and contains paintings by Matija Bradaška (1852–1915).

== Notable people ==
Notable people that were born or lived in Leše, or with ancestry from Leše, include:

- Josip Valjavec (1897–1959), lexicographer and religious writer
- Sunita Williams, American astronaut
