= Popovo, Tržič =

Popovo
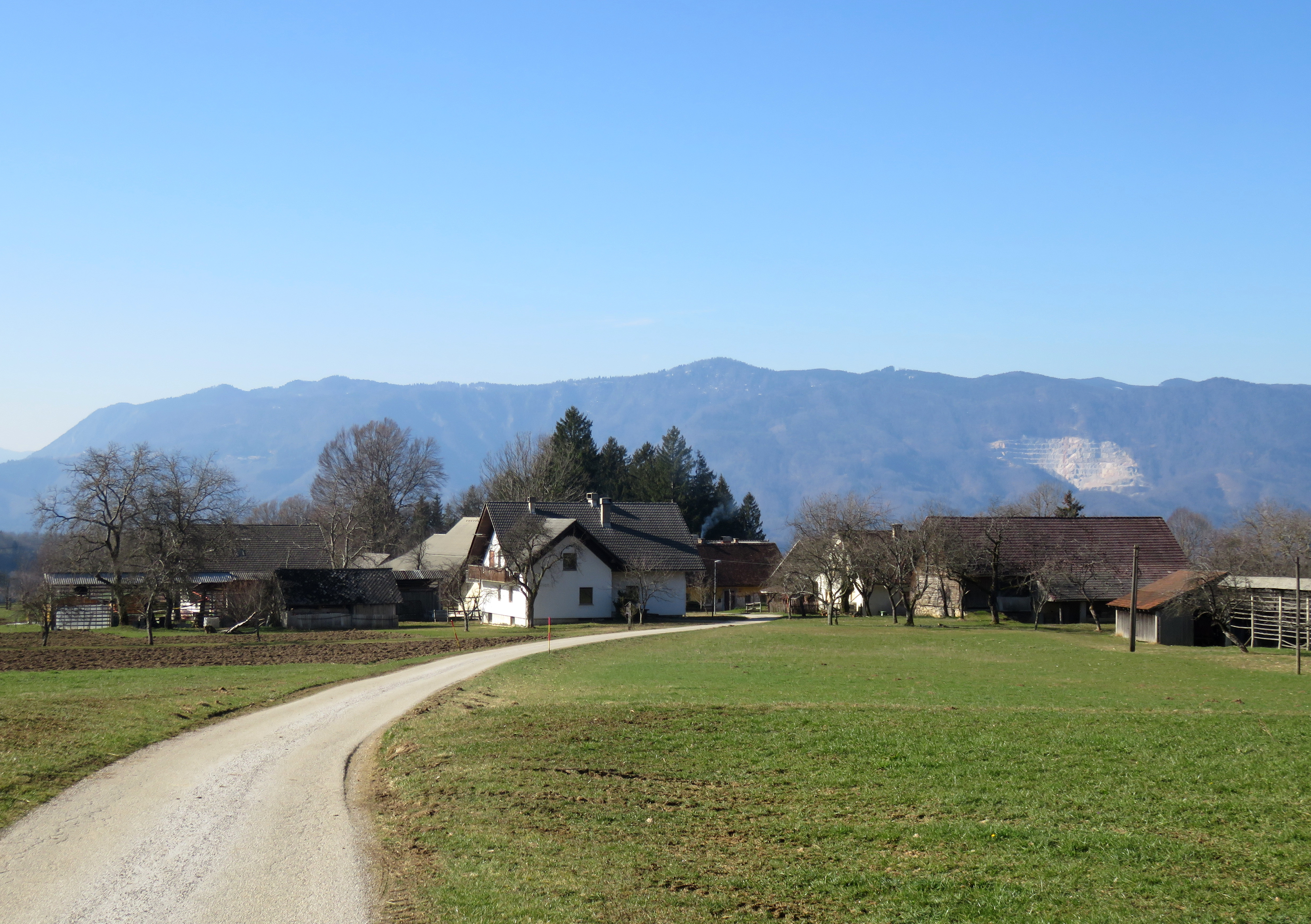

- Location in Slovenia
- Coordinates: 46°20′48.23″N 14°15′44.79″E
- Country: Slovenia
- Traditional region: Upper Carniola
- Statistical region: Upper Carniola
- Municipality: Tržič
- Elevation: 575.3 m (1,887 ft)

Population (2002)
  - Total: 27

Popovo (pronounced [pɔˈpɔːʋɔ] or [pɔˈpoːʋɔ]) is a settlement in the Municipality of Tržič in the Upper Carniola region of Slovenia.
