= Hudi Graben =

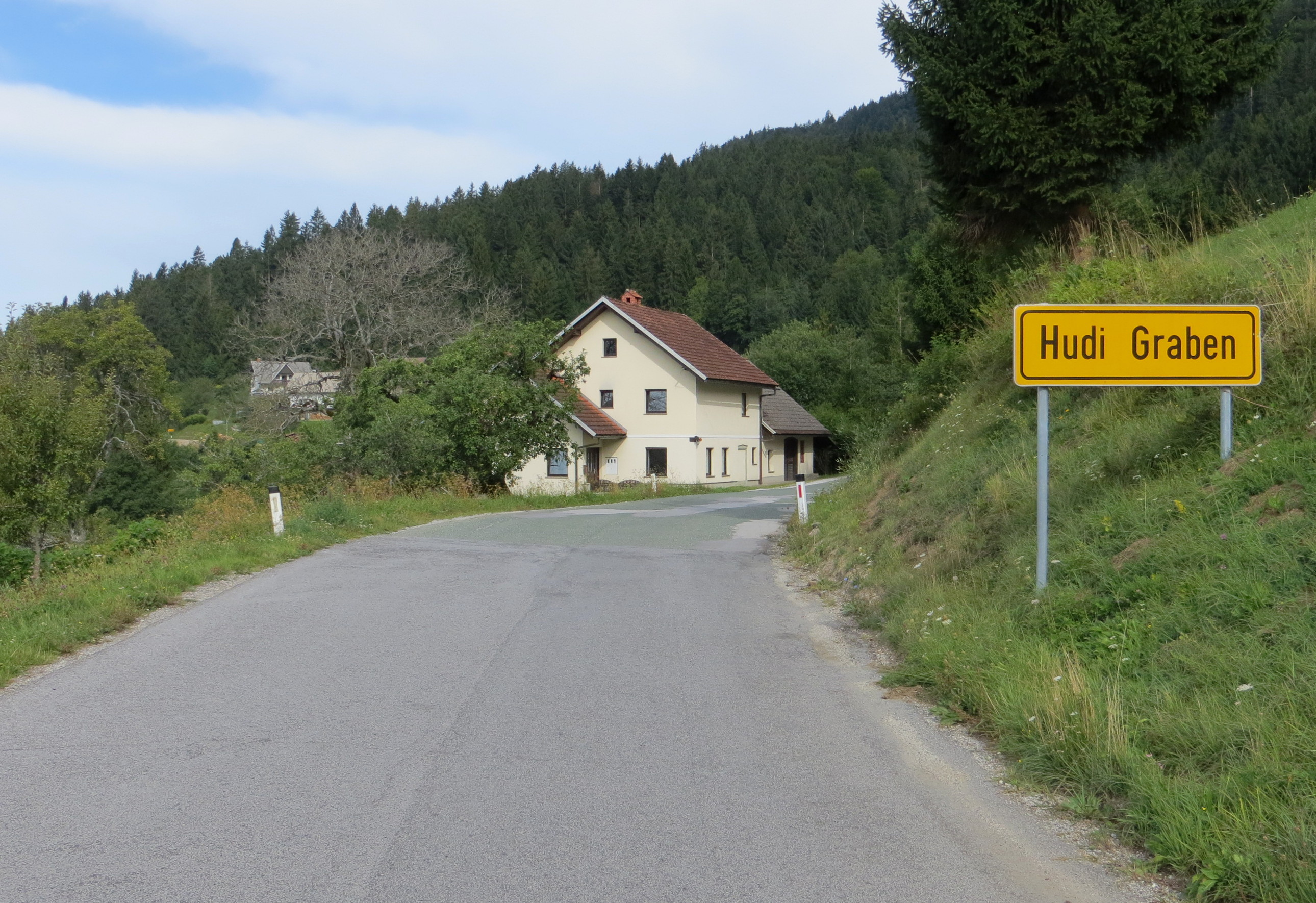

- Location in Slovenia
- Coordinates: 46°21′37.82″N 14°15′50.2″E
- Country: Slovenia
- Traditional region: Upper Carniola
- Statistical region: Upper Carniola
- Municipality: Tržič
- Elevation: 669.9 m (2,198 ft)

Population (2002)
  - Total: 51

Hudi Graben (pronounced [ˈxuːdi ˈɡɾaːbən]) is a settlement on the slopes of Mount Dobrča in the Municipality of Tržič in the Upper Carniola region of Slovenia.
