= Municipality of Tržič =

Municipality of Slovenia

Municipality of Tržič Občina Tržič
- Municipality
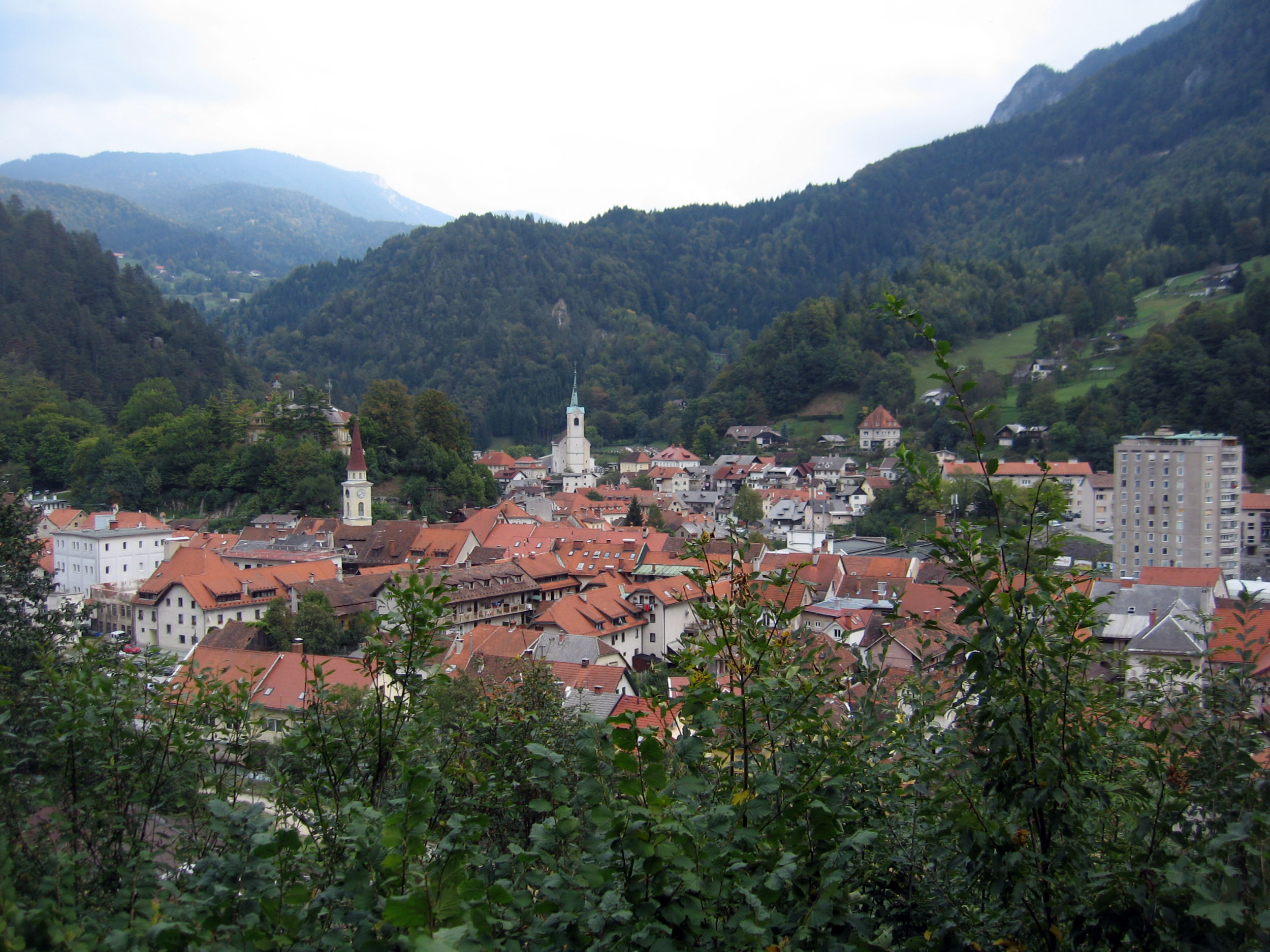

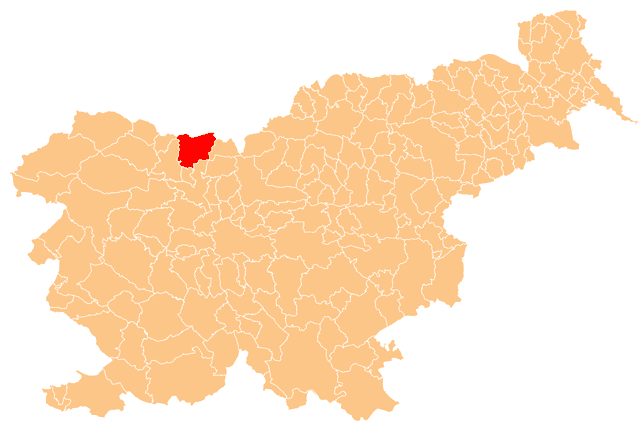
- Location of the Municipality of Tržič in Slovenia
- Coordinates: 46°22′N 14°19′E
- Country: Slovenia

Government
  - Mayor: Peter Miklič (Independent)

Area
  - Total: 155.4 km^{2} (60.0 sq mi)

Population (2016)
  - Total: 14,839
  - Density: 95.49/km^{2} (247.3/sq mi)
- Time zone: UTC+01 (CET)
  - Summer (DST): UTC+02 (CEST)
- Website: www.trzic.si

The Municipality of Tržič (pronounced [təɾˈʒitʃ]; Slovene: Občina Tržič) is a municipality in the traditional region of Upper Carniola in northwestern Slovenia. The seat of the municipality is the town of Tržič. Tržič became a municipality in 1994. It borders Austria.

== Settlements ==
In addition to the municipal seat of Tržič, the municipality also includes the following settlements:

- Bistrica pri Tržiču
- Brdo
- Breg ob Bistrici
- Brezje pri Tržiču
- Čadovlje pri Tržiču
- Dolina
- Gozd
- Grahovše
- Hudi Graben
- Hudo
- Hušica
- Jelendol
- Kovor
- Križe
- Leše
- Loka
- Lom pod Storžičem
- Novake
- Paloviče
- Podljubelj
- Popovo
- Potarje
- Pristava
- Retnje
- Ročevnica
- Sebenje
- Senično
- Slap
- Spodnje Vetrno
- Vadiče
- Visoče
- Zgornje Vetrno
- Žiganja Vas
- Zvirče
