= Ročevnica =

- Location in Slovenia
- Coordinates: 46°21′17.62″N 14°17′13.27″E
- Country: Slovenia
- Traditional region: Upper Carniola
- Statistical region: Upper Carniola
- Municipality: Tržič
- Elevation: 537.7 m (1,764 ft)

Population (2002)
  - Total: 557

Ročevnica (pronounced [ɾɔˈtʃeːu̯nitsa]) is a settlement in the Municipality of Tržič in the Upper Carniola region of Slovenia.
