= Brdo, Tržič =

Brdo
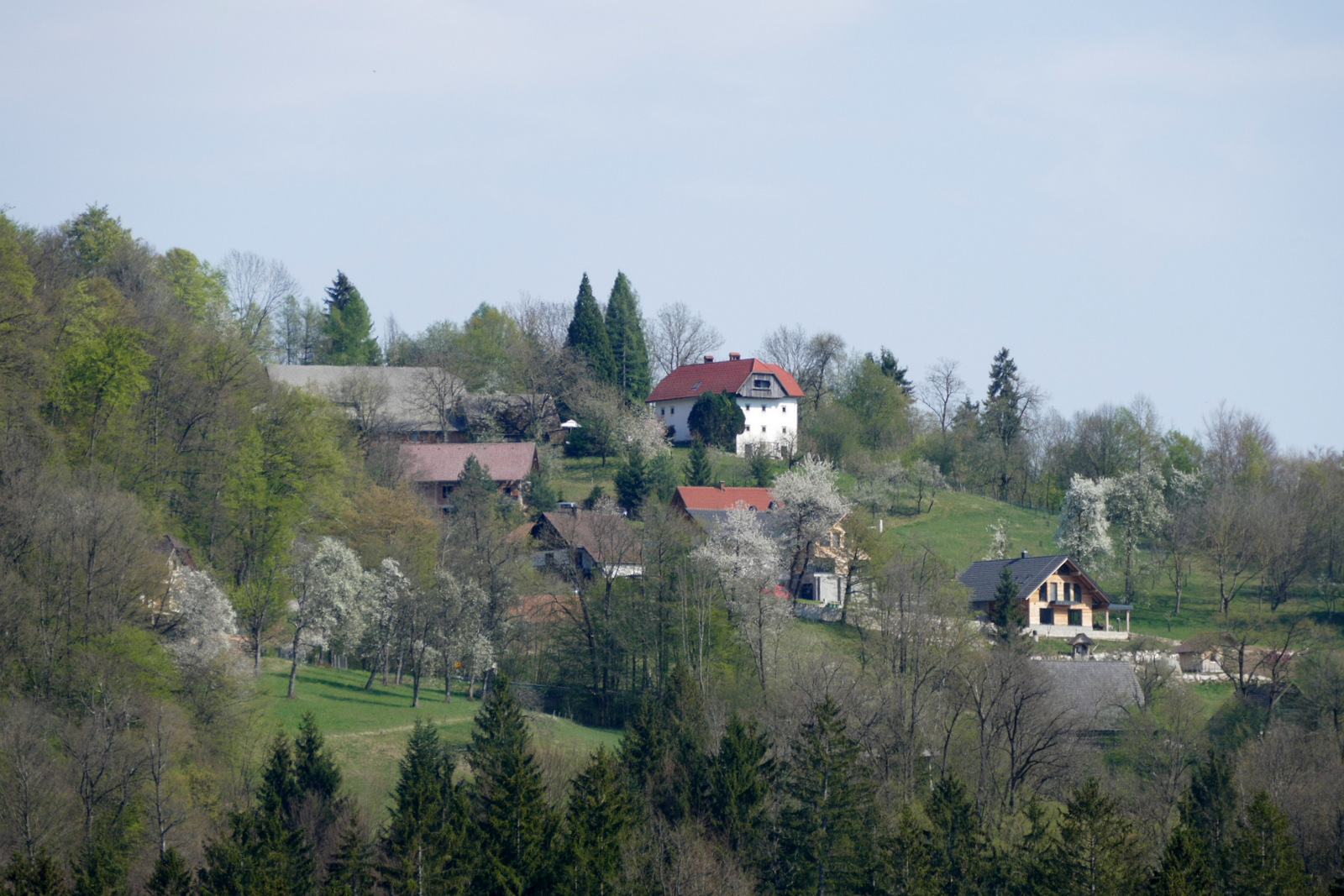

- Location in Slovenia
- Coordinates: 46°19′48.81″N 14°15′21.27″E
- Country: Slovenia
- Traditional region: Upper Carniola
- Statistical region: Upper Carniola
- Municipality: Tržič
- Elevation: 543.9 m (1,784 ft)

Population (2002)
  - Total: 24

Brdo (pronounced [ˈbəɾdɔ]) is a small settlement in the Municipality of Tržič in the Upper Carniola region of Slovenia.

== Name ==
Brdo was attested in written sources as Ekk c. 1420 and Nawarde in 1498.
