= Loka, Tržič =

Loka
- Location in Slovenia
- Coordinates: 46°20′47.23″N 14°17′22.09″E
- Country: Slovenia
- Traditional region: Upper Carniola
- Statistical region: Upper Carniola
- Municipality: Tržič
- Elevation: 487.7 m (1,600 ft)

Population (2002)
  - Total: 369

Loka (pronounced [ˈloːka]) is a village in the Municipality of Tržič in the Upper Carniola region of Slovenia.
