= Gozd, Tržič =

Gozd
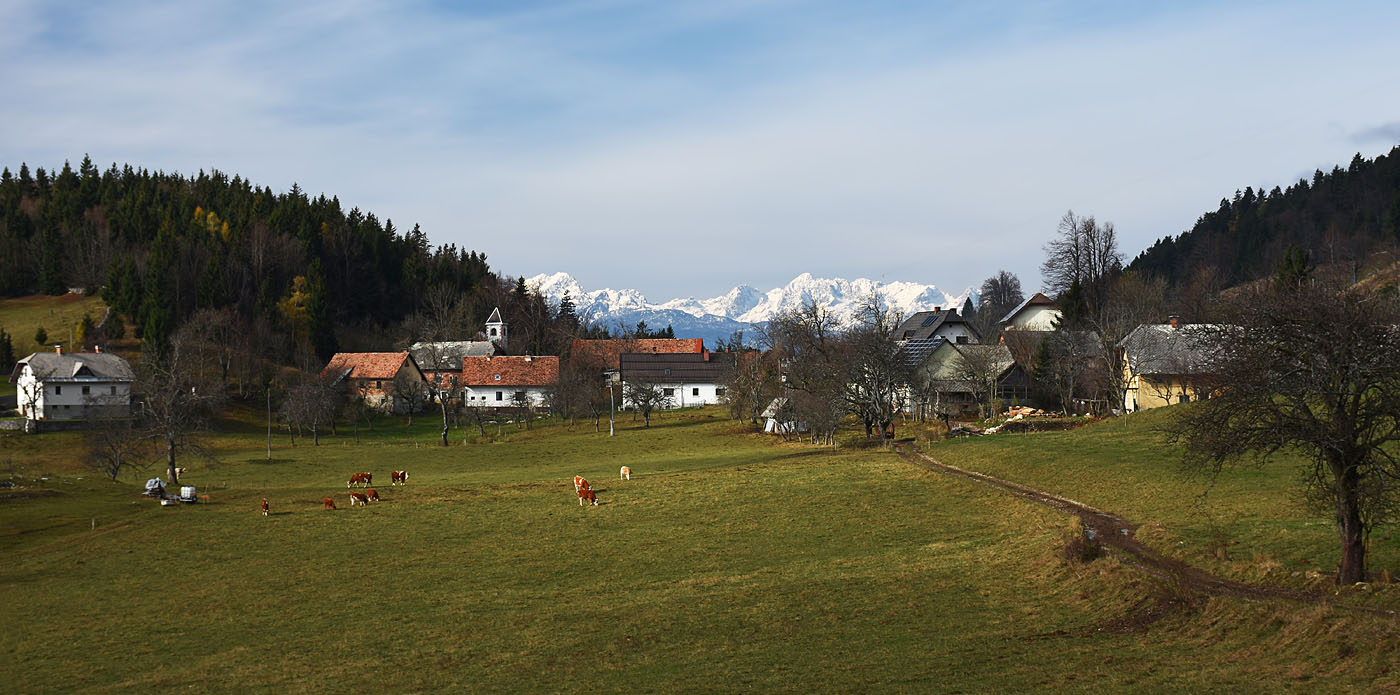

- Location in Slovenia
- Coordinates: 46°20′25.53″N 14°20′4.65″E
- Country: Slovenia
- Traditional region: Upper Carniola
- Statistical region: Upper Carniola
- Municipality: Tržič
- Elevation: 890.4 m (2,921 ft)

Population (2002)
  - Total: 23

Gozd (pronounced [ˈɡɔst]) is a settlement in the Municipality of Tržič in the Upper Carniola region of Slovenia.

The local church is dedicated to Saint Nicholas.
