= Vadiče =

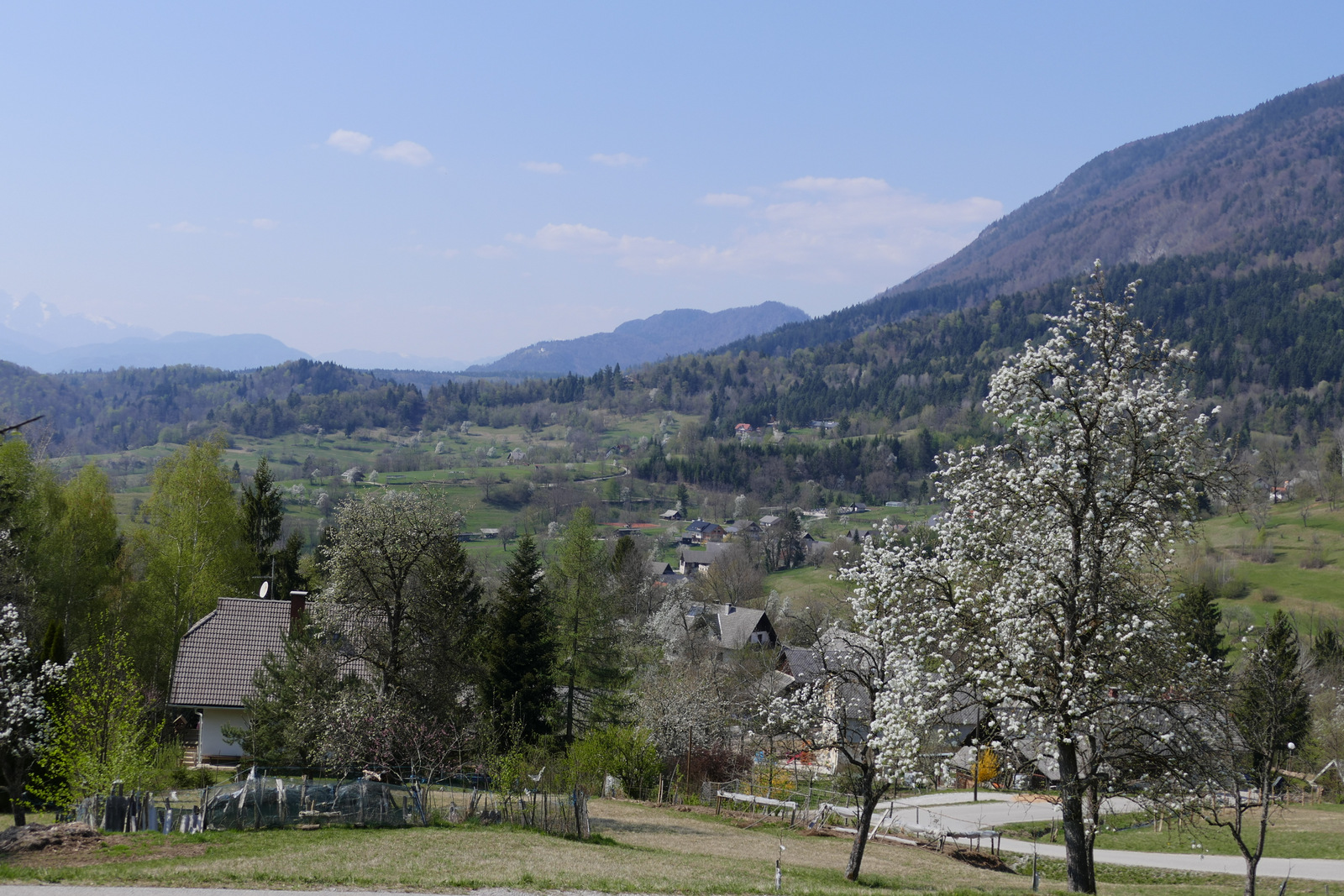

- Location in Slovenia
- Coordinates: 46°20′57.61″N 14°15′41.86″E
- Country: Slovenia
- Traditional region: Upper Carniola
- Statistical region: Upper Carniola
- Municipality: Tržič
- Elevation: 527.3 m (1,730 ft)

Population (2002)
  - Total: 18

Vadiče (pronounced [ˈʋaːditʃɛ]) is a settlement in the Municipality of Tržič in the Upper Carniola region of Slovenia.
