= Bistrica pri Tržiču =

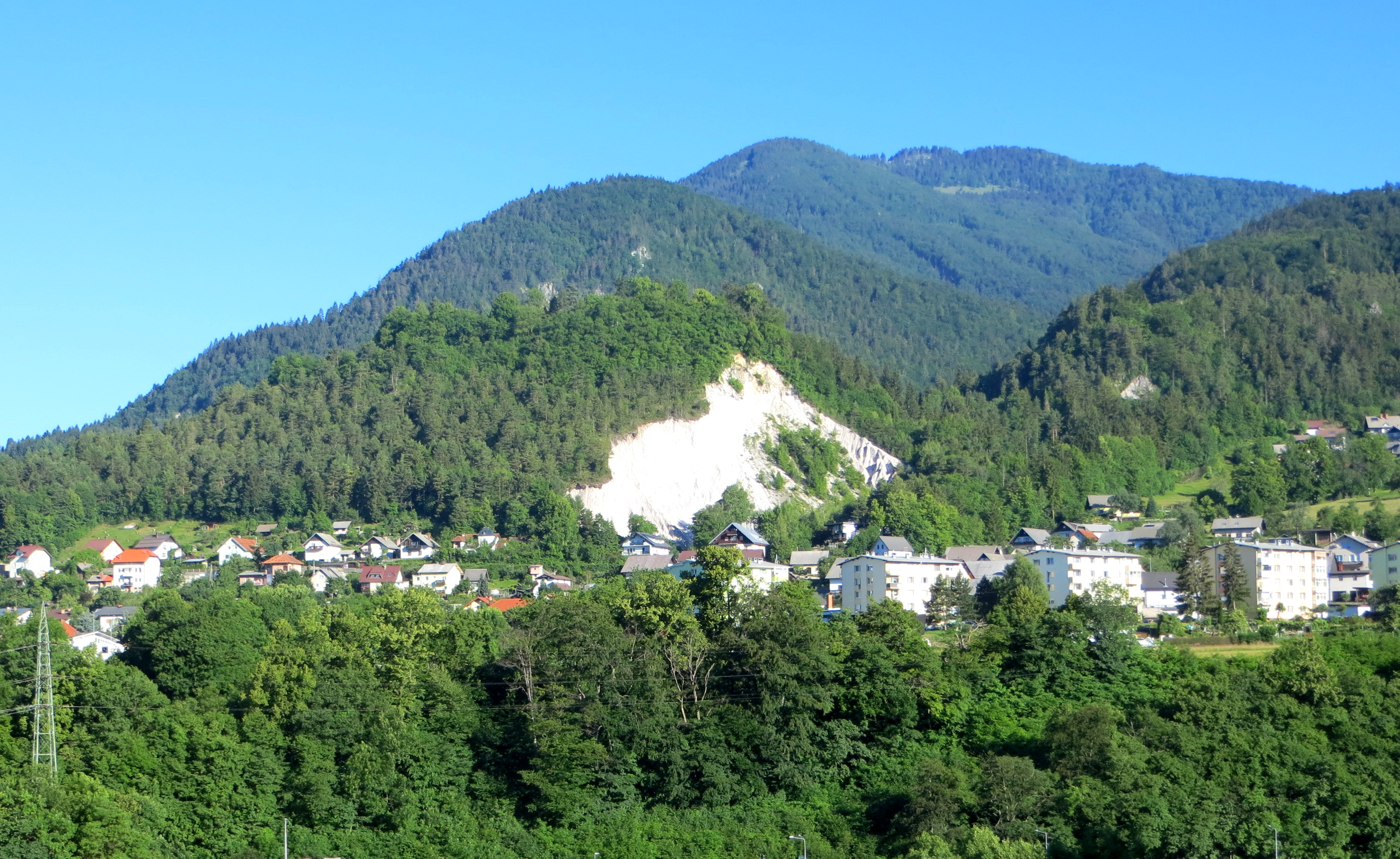

- Location in Slovenia
- Coordinates: 46°21′29.09″N 14°17′34.64″E
- Country: Slovenia
- Traditional region: Upper Carniola
- Statistical region: Upper Carniola
- Municipality: Tržič
- Elevation: 543.7 m (1,784 ft)

Population (2002)
  - Total: 3,187

Bistrica pri Tržiču (pronounced [ˈbiːstɾitsa pɾi təɾˈʒiːtʃu]; German: Feistritz) is a settlement in the Municipality of Tržič in the Upper Carniola region of Slovenia.

== Name ==
Bistrica pri Tržiču was attested in written sources as Fuistriza between 1050 and 1063, Fistricium in 1247, and Fewstricz in 1391, among other spellings. The name of the settlement was changed from Bistrica to Bistrica pri Tržiču in 1953. In the past the German name was Feistritz.

== Church ==
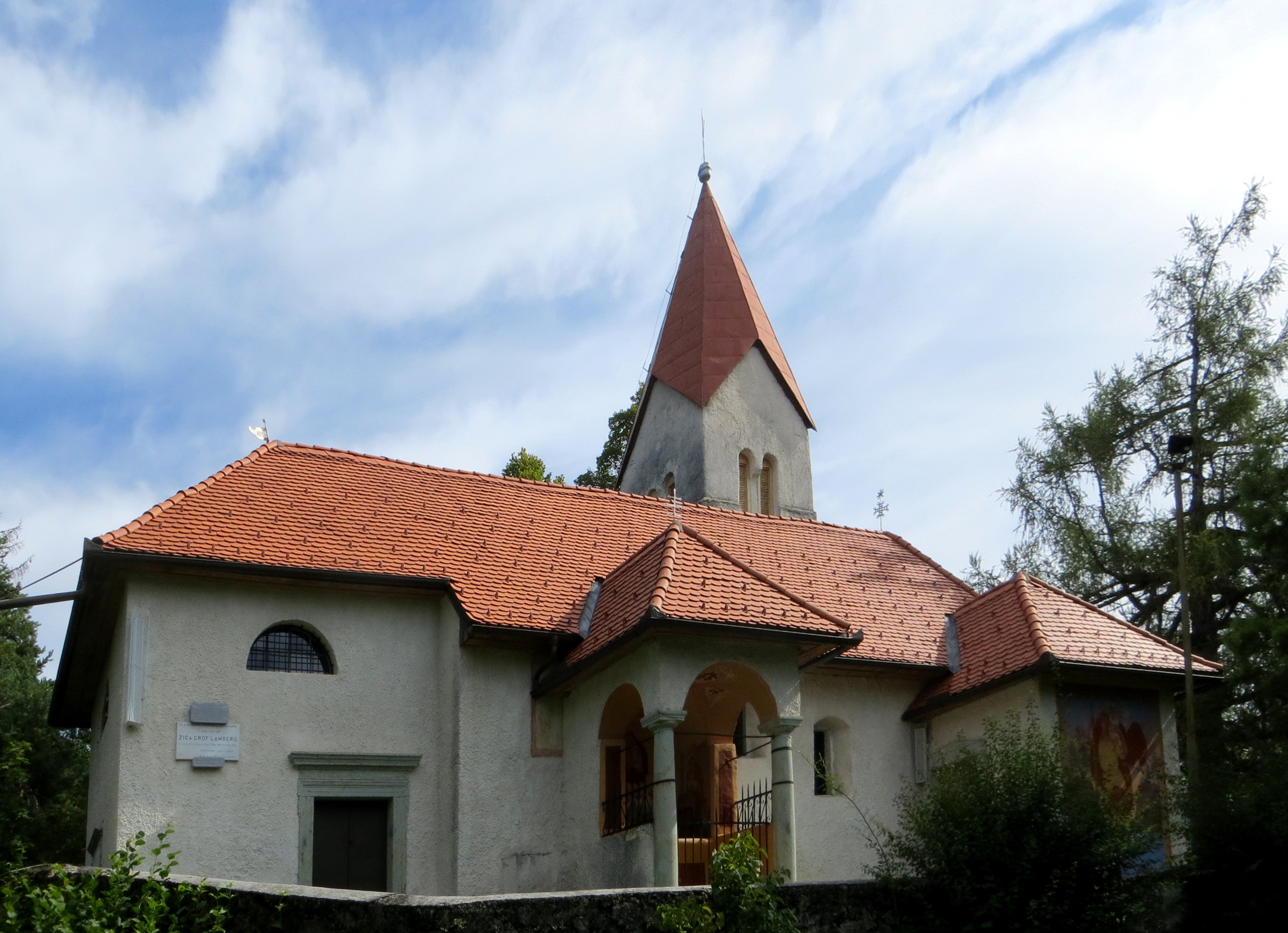
St. George's Church

Northeast of the settlement's core stands St. George's Church, a chapel-of-ease of the Parish of Tržič. It is a 15th-century Baroque-redesigned Gothic church with a late-Gothic chancel and a coffered ceiling. The furnishings are from the 19th century.
