= Spodnje Vetrno =

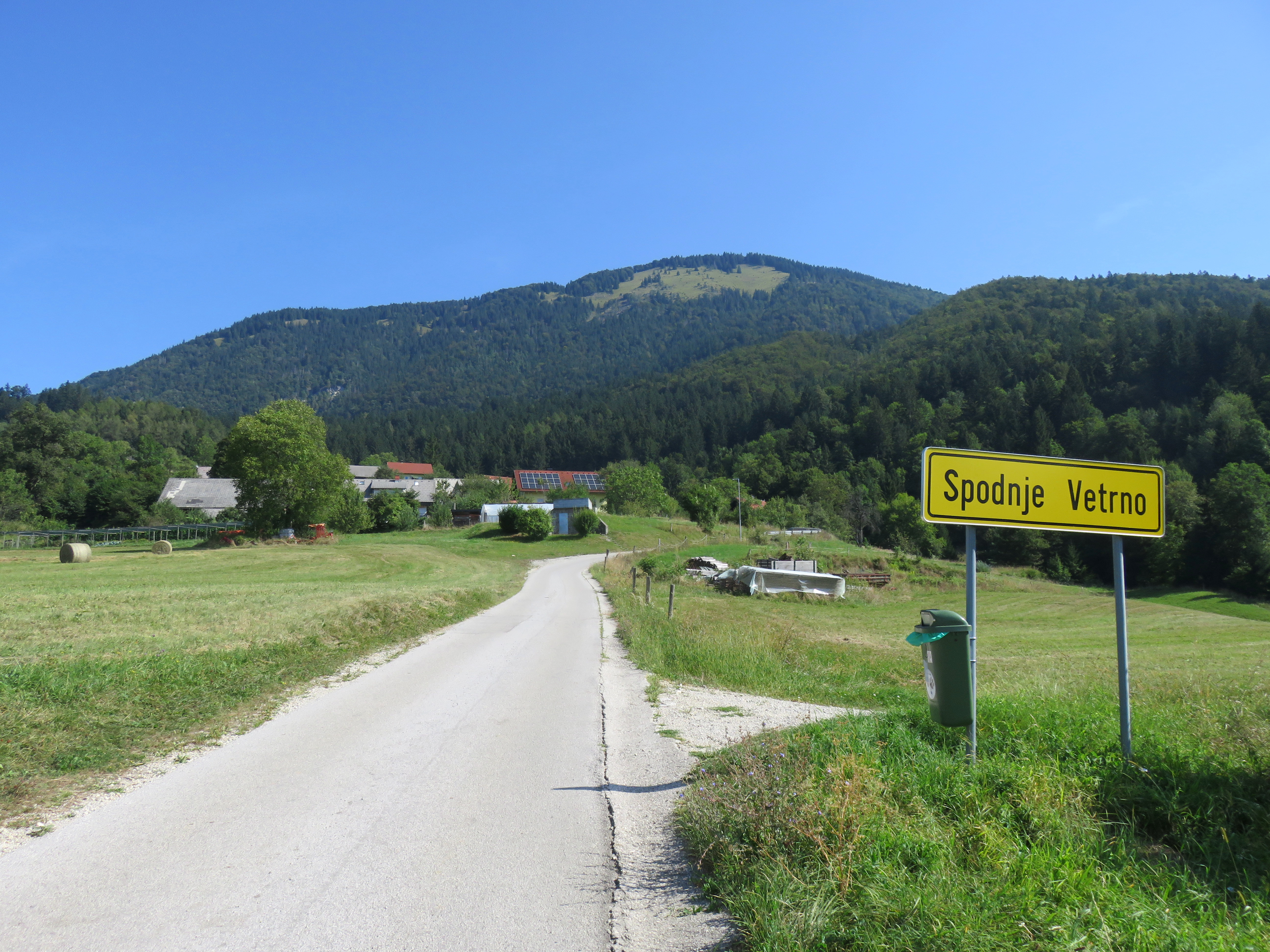

- Location in Slovenia
- Coordinates: 46°20′17.42″N 14°19′7.22″E
- Country: Slovenia
- Traditional region: Upper Carniola
- Statistical region: Upper Carniola
- Municipality: Tržič
- Elevation: 626.9 m (2,057 ft)

Population (2002)
  - Total: 43

Spodnje Vetrno (pronounced [ˈspoːdnjɛ ˈʋeːtəɾnɔ]; in older sources also Spodnje Veterne, German: Unterveterne) is a settlement in the Municipality of Tržič in the Upper Carniola region of Slovenia.
