= Slap, Tržič =

Slap
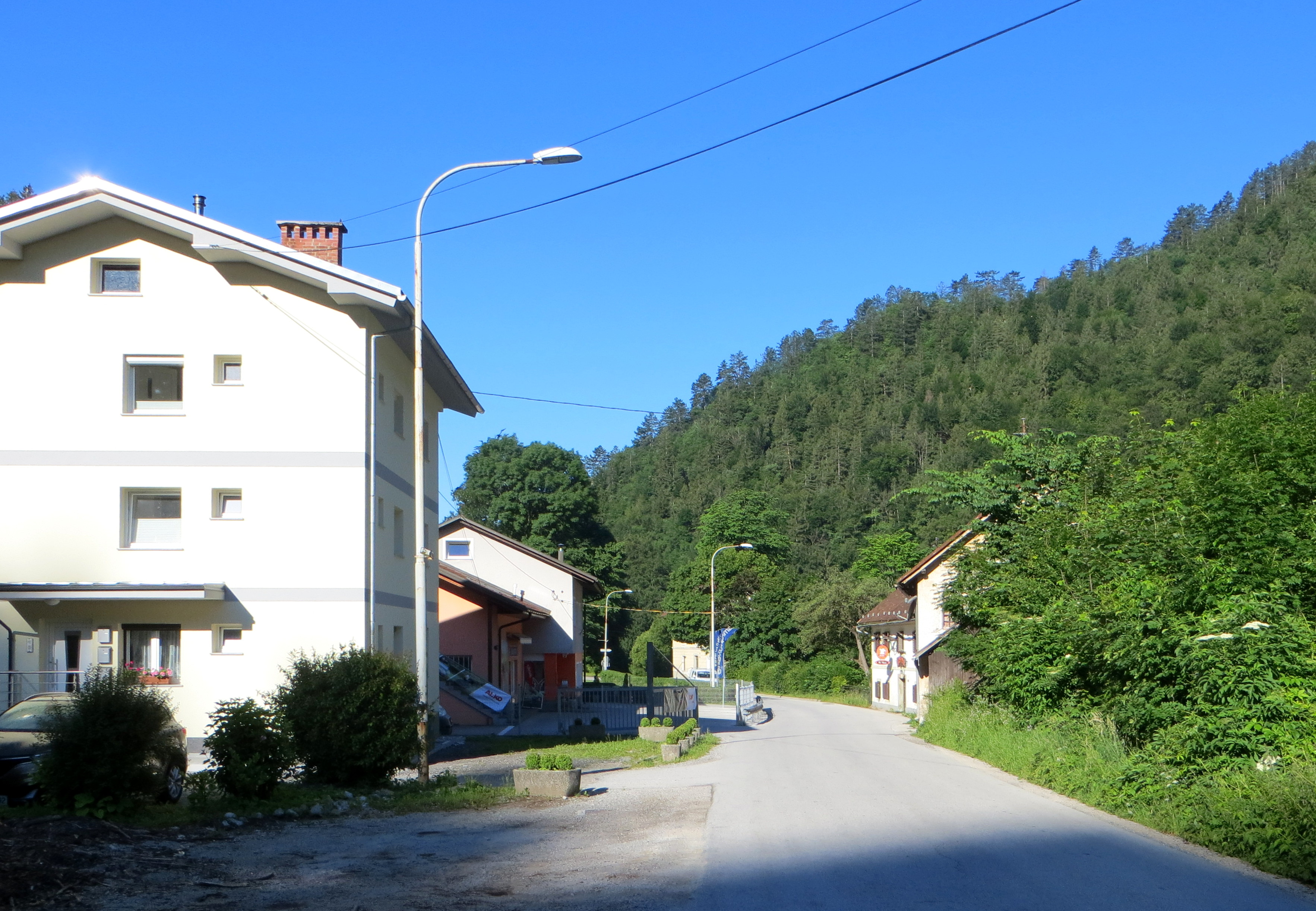

- Location in Slovenia
- Coordinates: 46°22′7.22″N 14°19′6.8″E
- Country: Slovenia
- Traditional region: Upper Carniola
- Statistical region: Upper Carniola
- Municipality: Tržič
- Elevation: 536.4 m (1,760 ft)

Population (2002)
  - Total: 181

Slap (pronounced [ˈslaːp]) is a settlement in the Municipality of Tržič in the Upper Carniola region of Slovenia.
