= Križe, Tržič =

Križe
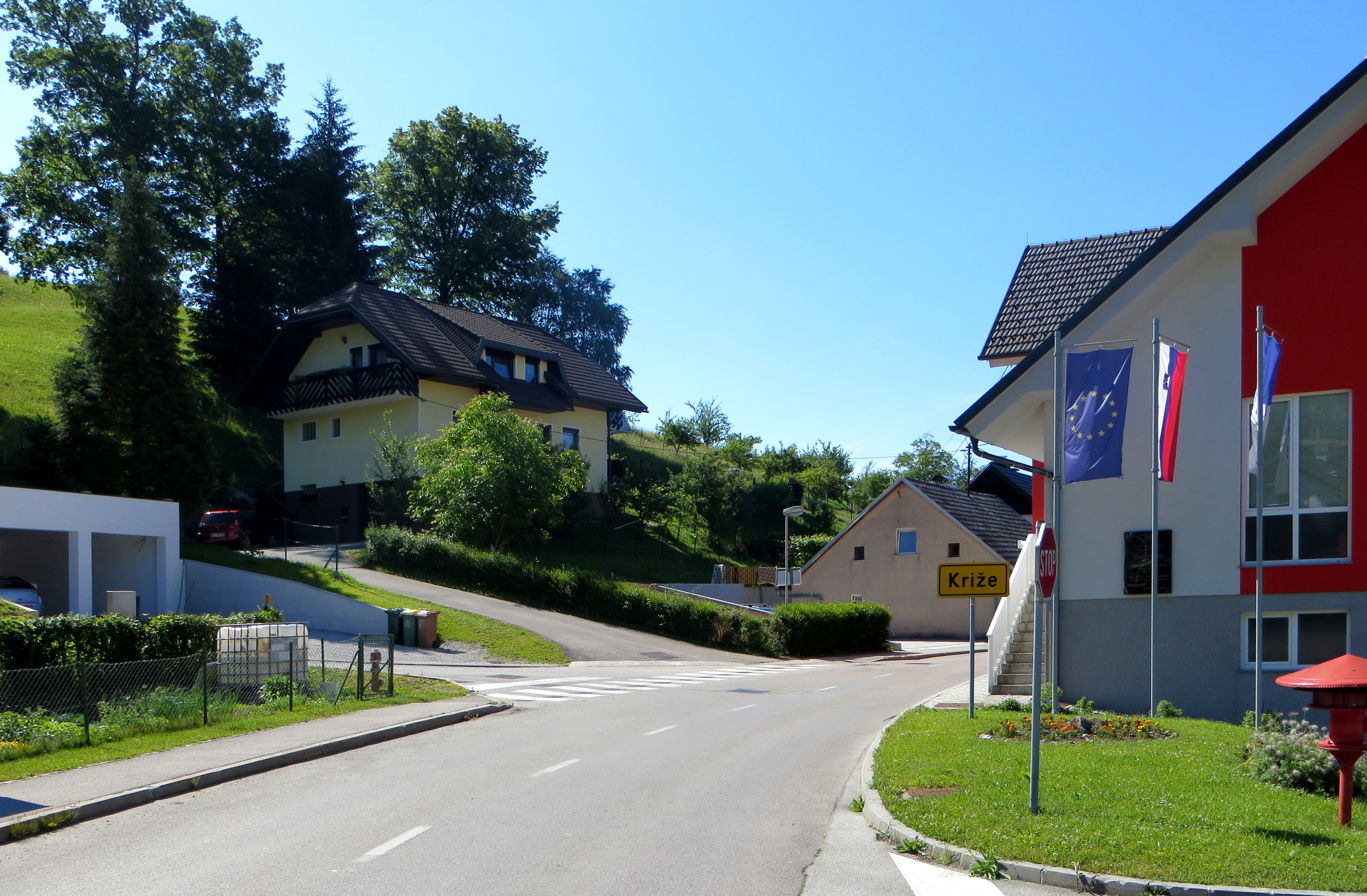

- Location in Slovenia
- Coordinates: 46°20′28.4″N 14°18′7.23″E
- Country: Slovenia
- Traditional region: Upper Carniola
- Statistical region: Upper Carniola
- Municipality: Tržič
- Elevation: 531.2 m (1,743 ft)

Population (2002)
  - Total: 859

Križe (pronounced [ˈkɾiːʒɛ]; German: Heiligenkreuz) is a village in the Municipality of Tržič in the Upper Carniola region of Slovenia.

== Church ==
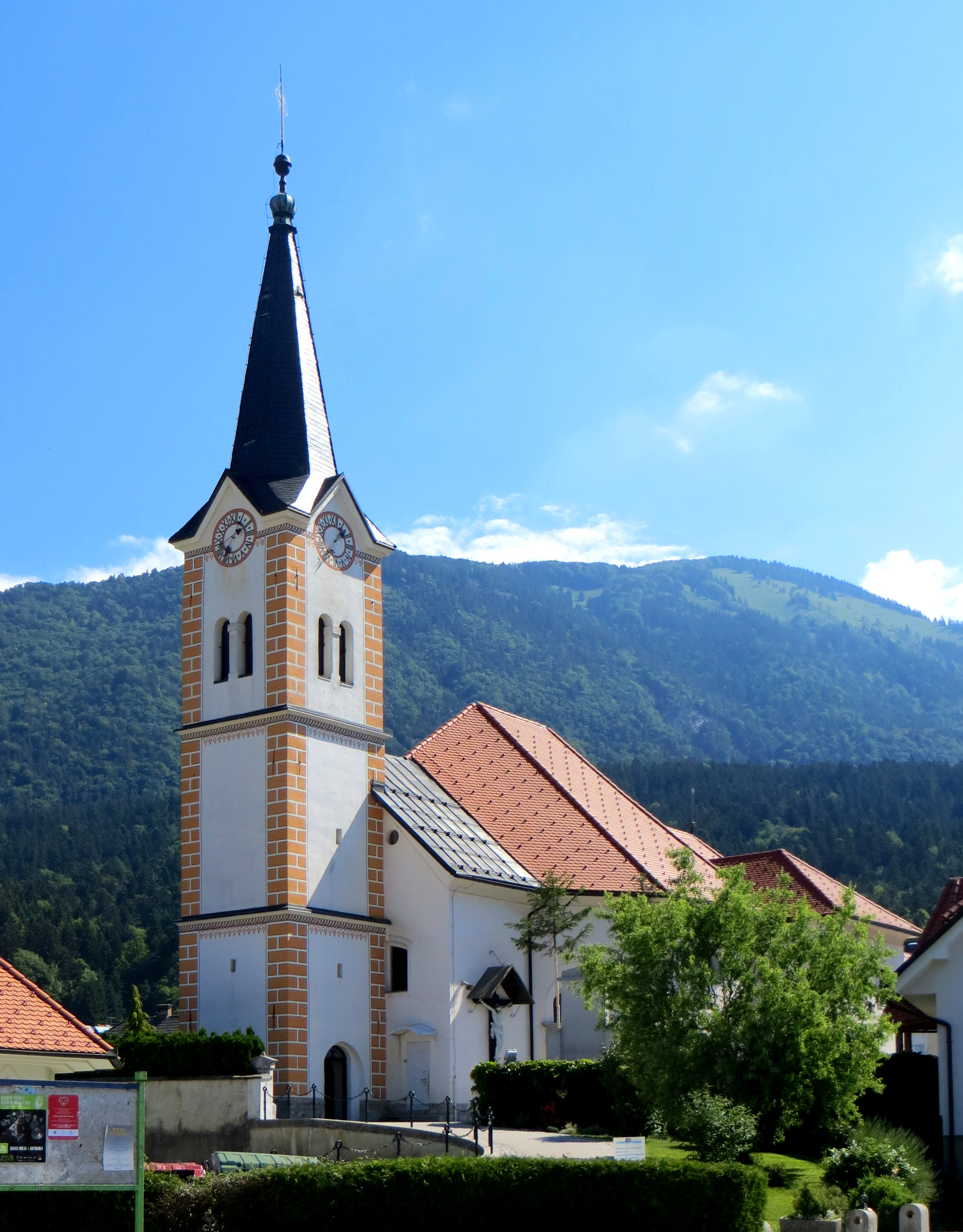
Holy Cross Church

The parish church in the village is dedicated to the Feast of the Holy Cross.
