= Malo Hudo =

Malo Hudo Hudo (until 1953)
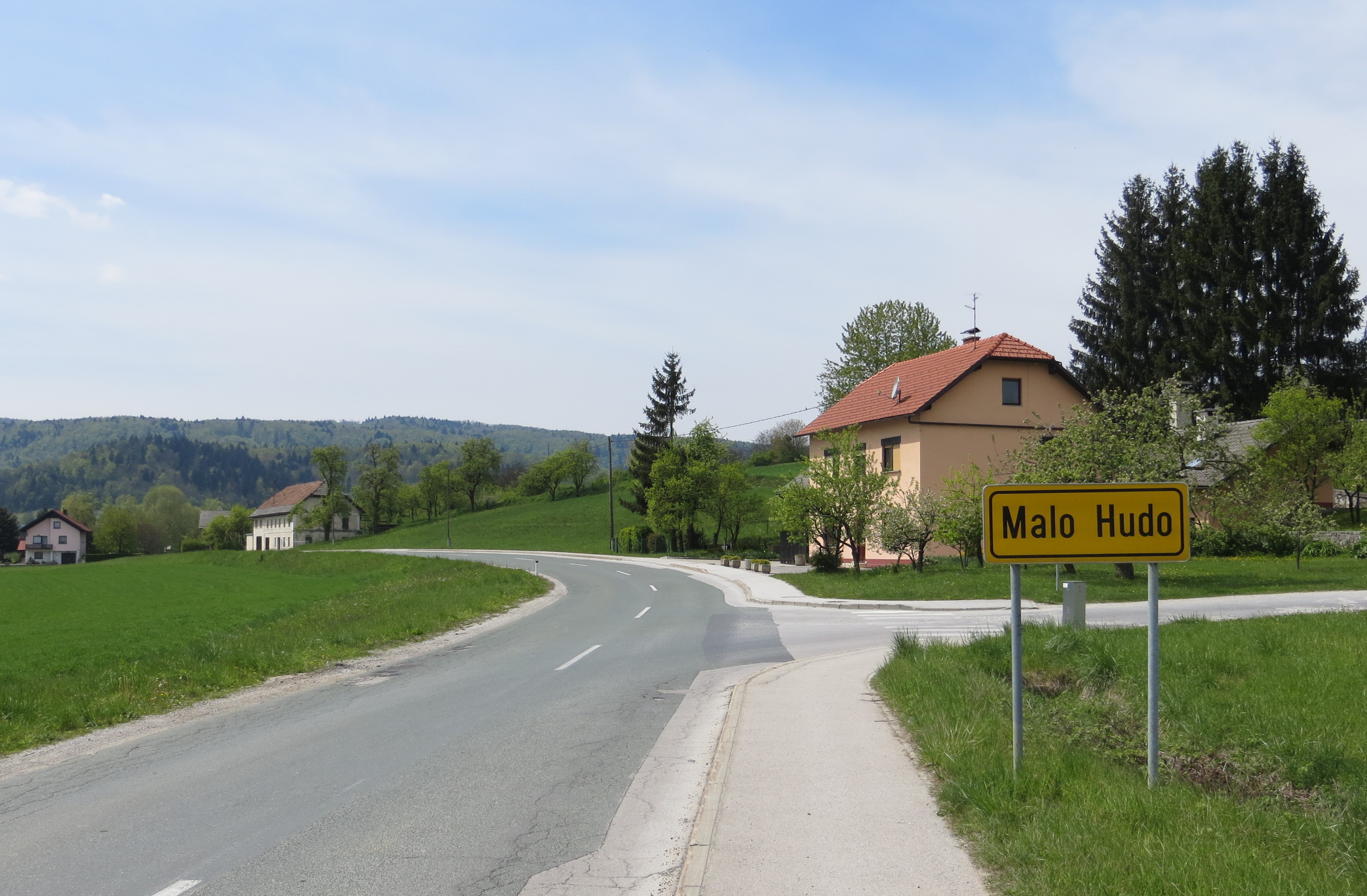

- Location in Slovenia
- Coordinates: 45°56′24.53″N 14°47′15.76″E
- Country: Slovenia
- Traditional region: Lower Carniola
- Statistical region: Central Slovenia
- Municipality: Ivančna Gorica

Area
  - Total: 1.13 km^{2} (0.44 sq mi)
- Elevation: 362.4 m (1,189 ft)

Population (2002)
  - Total: 141

Malo Hudo (pronounced [ˈmaːlɔ ˈxuːdɔ]; German: Pösendorf) is a settlement just west of Ivančna Gorica in the historical region of Lower Carniola in central Slovenia. The Municipality of Ivančna Gorica is now included in the Central Slovenia Statistical Region.

== Name ==
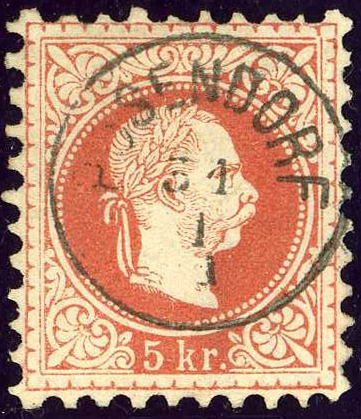
The name Pösendorf was used on this Austro-Hungarian 1874 cancellation

The name of the settlement was changed from Hudo to Malo Hudo (literally, 'little Hudo') in 1953. The name Hudo is derived from the adjective hud 'bad, poor' and, as in similar names (e.g., Huje), refers to poor soil quality in the region. In the past the German name was Pösendorf.
