= Žiganja Vas =

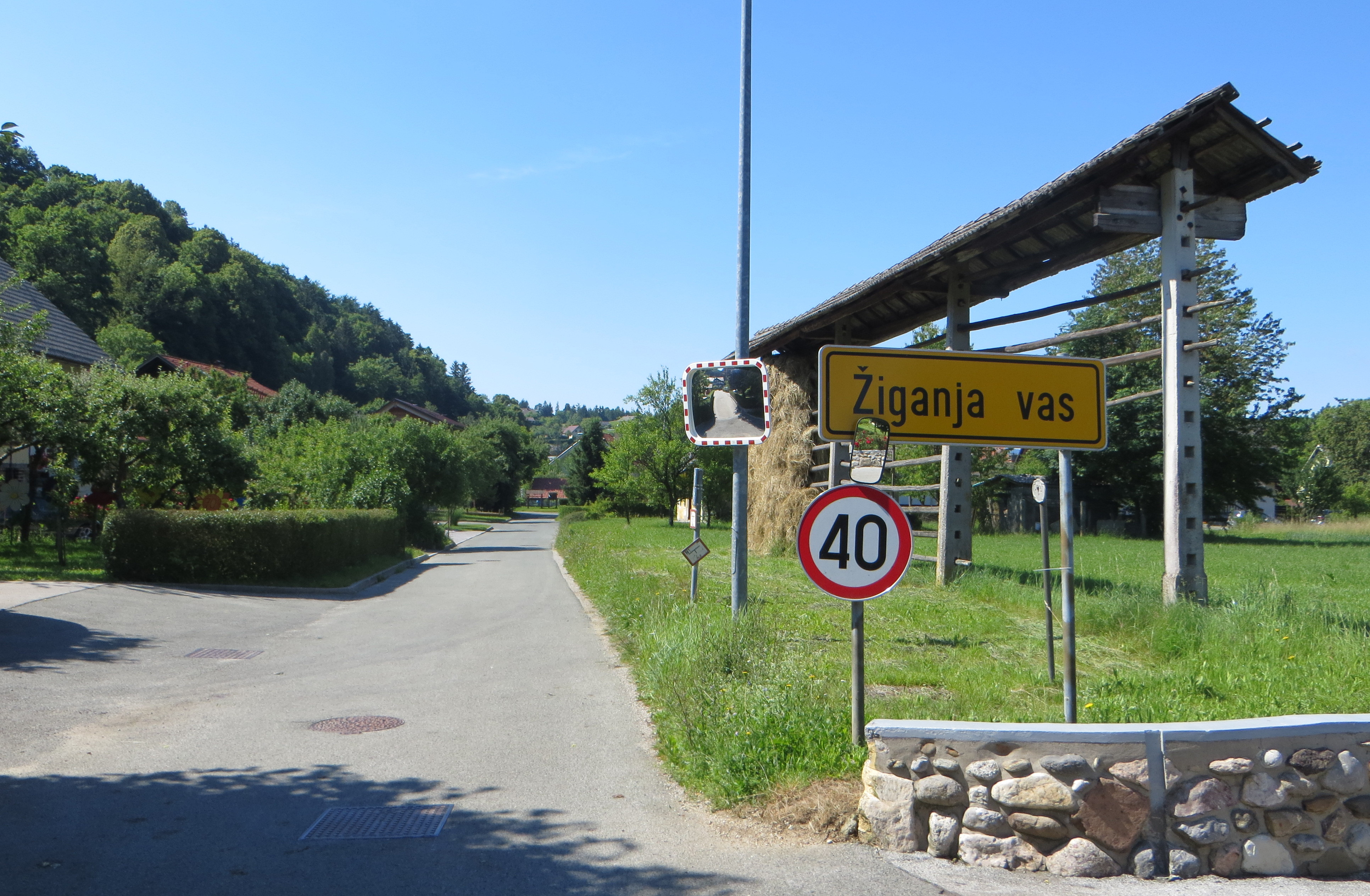

- Location in Slovenia
- Coordinates: 46°19′27.13″N 14°17′59.12″E
- Country: Slovenia
- Traditional region: Upper Carniola
- Statistical region: Upper Carniola
- Municipality: Tržič
- Elevation: 484.5 m (1,590 ft)

Population (2002)
  - Total: 435

Žiganja Vas (pronounced [ˈʒiːɡanja ˈʋaːs]; Slovene: Žiganja vas, German: Siegersdorf) is a settlement in the Municipality of Tržič in the Upper Carniola region of Slovenia.

== Church ==
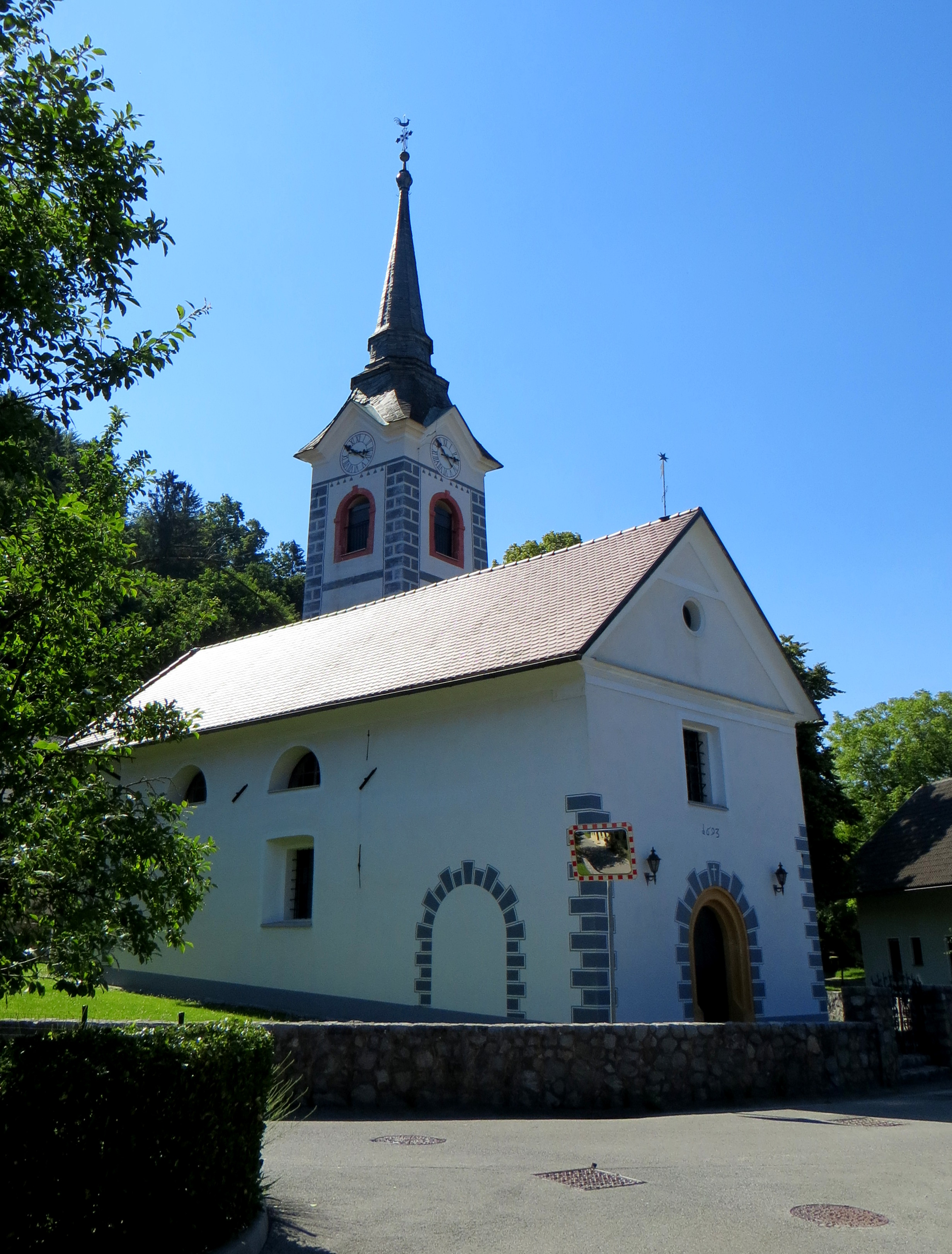
Saint Ulrich's Church

The local church is dedicated to St. Ulrich. It was first mentioned in documents in 1327, and was extensively rebuilt in 1693 as indicated by the date above the portal. Fragments of frescos from the early 15th century survive in the church.
