= Zgornje Vetrno =

- Location in Slovenia
- Coordinates: 46°20′21.18″N 14°18′46.6″E
- Country: Slovenia
- Traditional region: Upper Carniola
- Statistical region: Upper Carniola
- Municipality: Tržič
- Elevation: 657.9 m (2,158 ft)

Population (2002)
  - Total: 44

Zgornje Vetrno (pronounced [ˈzɡoːɾnjɛ ˈʋeːtəɾnɔ]; in older sources also Zgornje Veterne, German: Oberveterne) is a settlement in the Municipality of Tržič in the Upper Carniola region of Slovenia.
