= Potarje, Tržič =

Potarje
- Location in Slovenia
- Coordinates: 46°22′20.22″N 14°20′9.34″E
- Country: Slovenia
- Traditional region: Upper Carniola
- Statistical region: Upper Carniola
- Municipality: Tržič
- Elevation: 820.1 m (2,691 ft)

Population (2002)
  - Total: 65

Potarje (pronounced [ˈpoːtarjɛ]) is a settlement in the Municipality of Tržič in the Upper Carniola region of Slovenia.
