= Kovor =

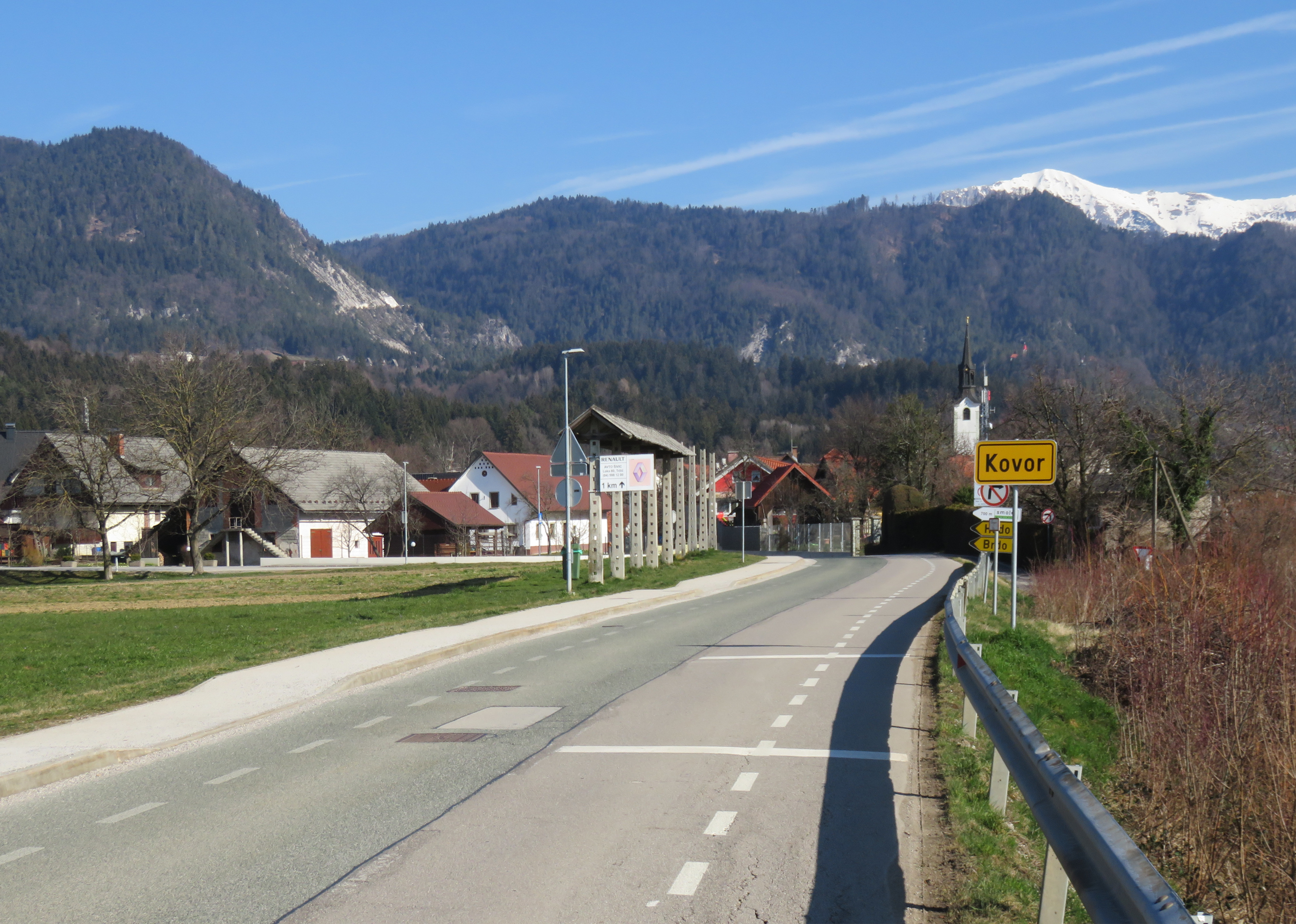

- Location in Slovenia
- Coordinates: 46°20′36.06″N 14°16′57.44″E
- Country: Slovenia
- Traditional region: Upper Carniola
- Statistical region: Upper Carniola
- Municipality: Tržič
- Elevation: 512.1 m (1,680 ft)

Population (2002)
  - Total: 758

Kovor (pronounced [ˈkɔːʋɔɾ]; German: Kaier) is a village in the Municipality of Tržič in the Upper Carniola region of Slovenia.

== Church ==
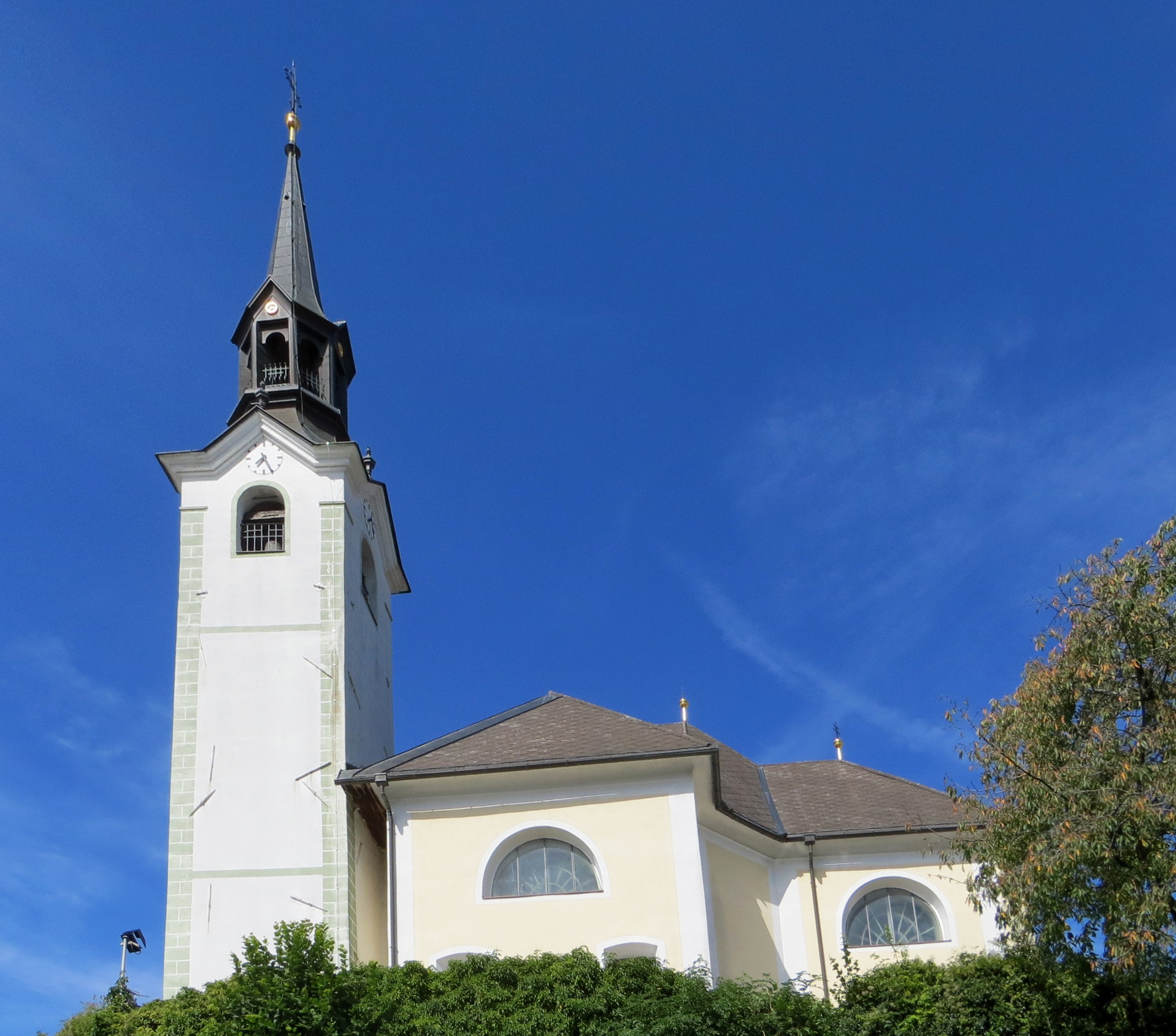
Saint John the Baptist Church

The parish church in the village is dedicated to John the Baptist and was first mentioned in documents dating to 1296. Today's building is from the mid-18th century.
