= Paloviče =

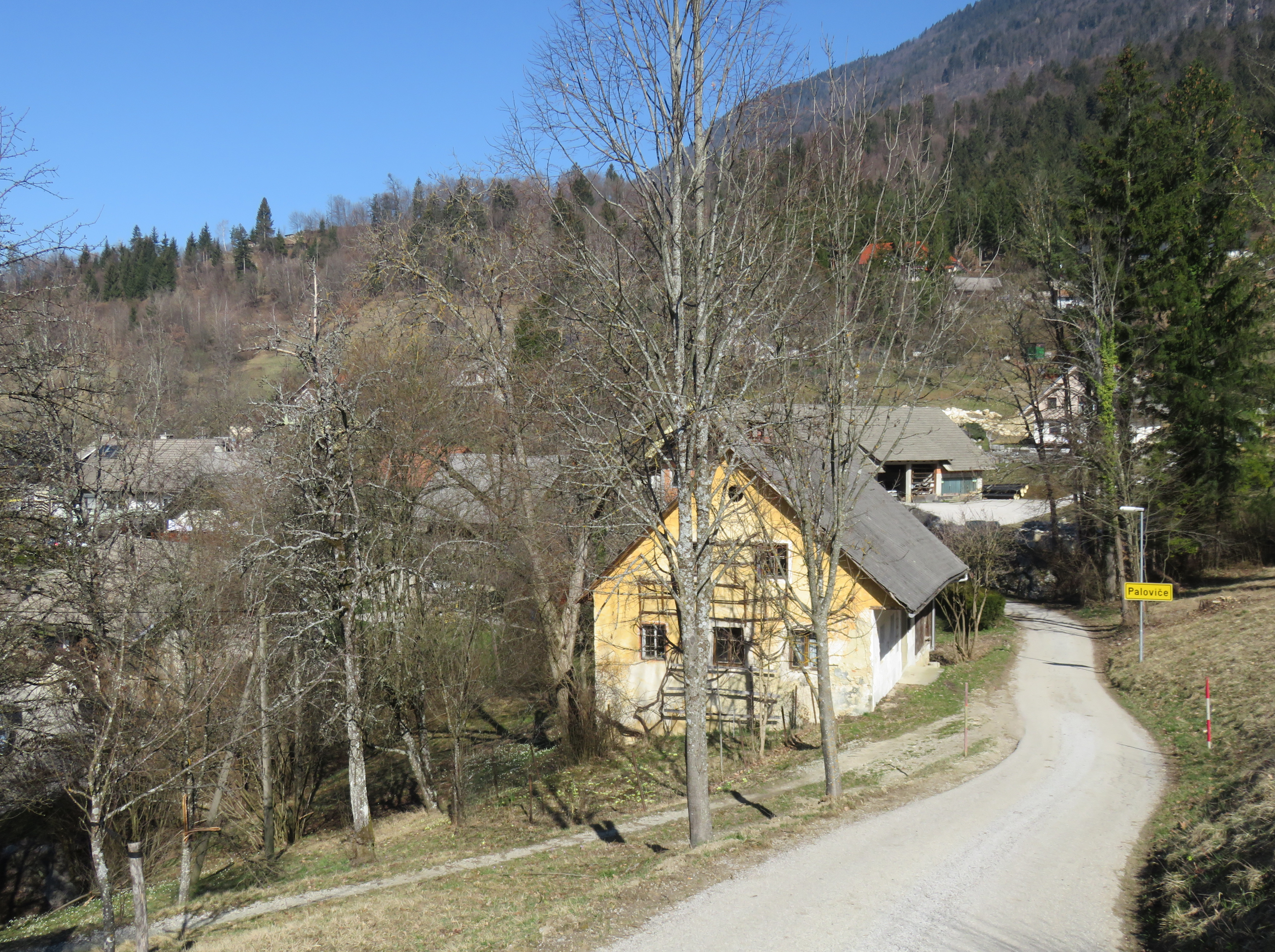

- Location in Slovenia
- Coordinates: 46°21′20.62″N 14°14′54.3″E
- Country: Slovenia
- Traditional region: Upper Carniola
- Statistical region: Upper Carniola
- Municipality: Tržič
- Elevation: 523.6 m (1,718 ft)

Population (2002)
  - Total: 59

Paloviče (pronounced [ˈpaːlɔʋitʃɛ], German: Palowitsch) is a settlement in the Municipality of Tržič in the Upper Carniola region of Slovenia.
