= Pálovice =

- Municipality
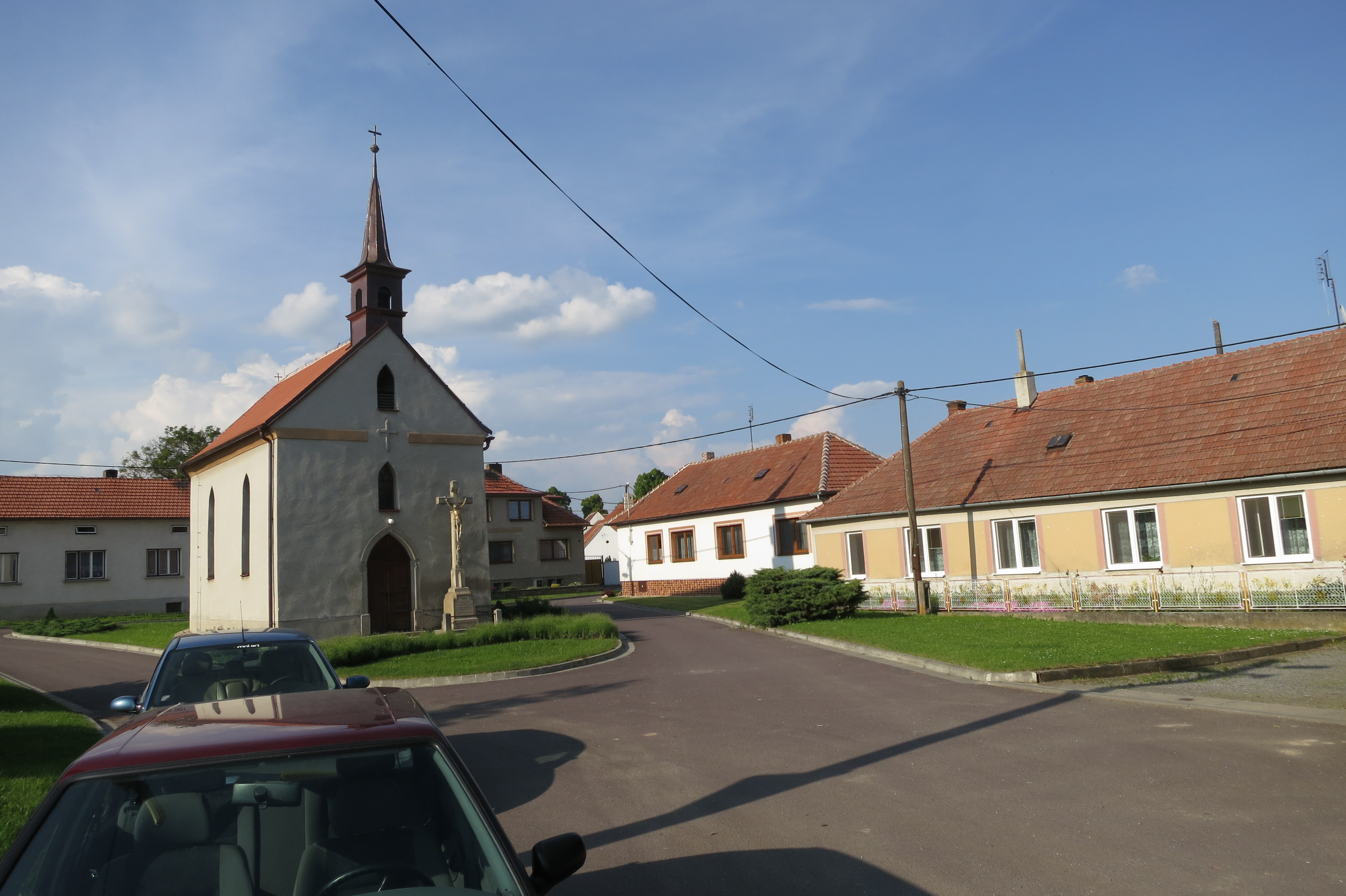
- Centre of Pálovice

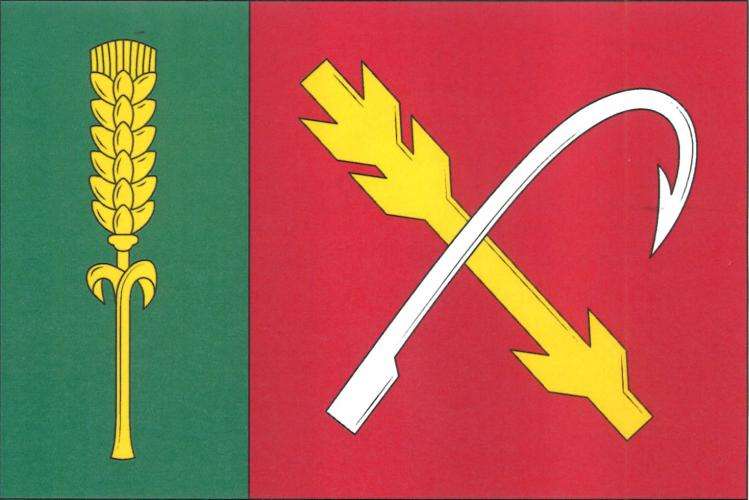
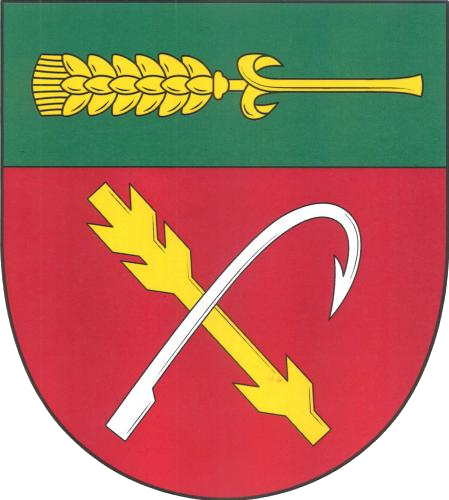
- Flag Coat of arms

- Location in the Czech Republic
- Coordinates: 49°0′20″N 15°32′15″E
- Country: Czech Republic
- Region: Vysočina
- District: Třebíč
- First mentioned: 1349

Area
  - Total: 5.92 km^{2} (2.29 sq mi)
- Elevation: 473 m (1,552 ft)

Population (2026-01-01)
  - Total: 171
  - Density: 28.9/km^{2} (74.8/sq mi)
- Time zone: UTC+1 (CET)
  - Summer (DST): UTC+2 (CEST)
- Postal code: 675 31
- Website: www.palovice.cz

Pálovice is a municipality and village in Třebíč District in the Vysočina Region of the Czech Republic. It has about 200 inhabitants.

Pálovice lies approximately 35 kilometres (22 mi) south-west of Třebíč, 44 km (27 mi) south of Jihlava, and 144 km (89 mi) south-east of Prague.

== Demographics ==
Historical population
Year	Pop.	±%
1869	303	—
1880	345	+13.9%
1890	316	−8.4%
1900	340	+7.6%
1910	307	−9.7%
1921	321	+4.6%
1930	312	−2.8%
1950	230	−26.3%
1961	244	+6.1%
1970	219	−10.2%
1980	190	−13.2%
1991	155	−18.4%
2001	166	+7.1%
2011	168	+1.2%
2021	161	−4.2%
Source: Censuses
