= Brezje pri Tržiču =

Brezje pri Tržiču Sveta Neža (until 1955)
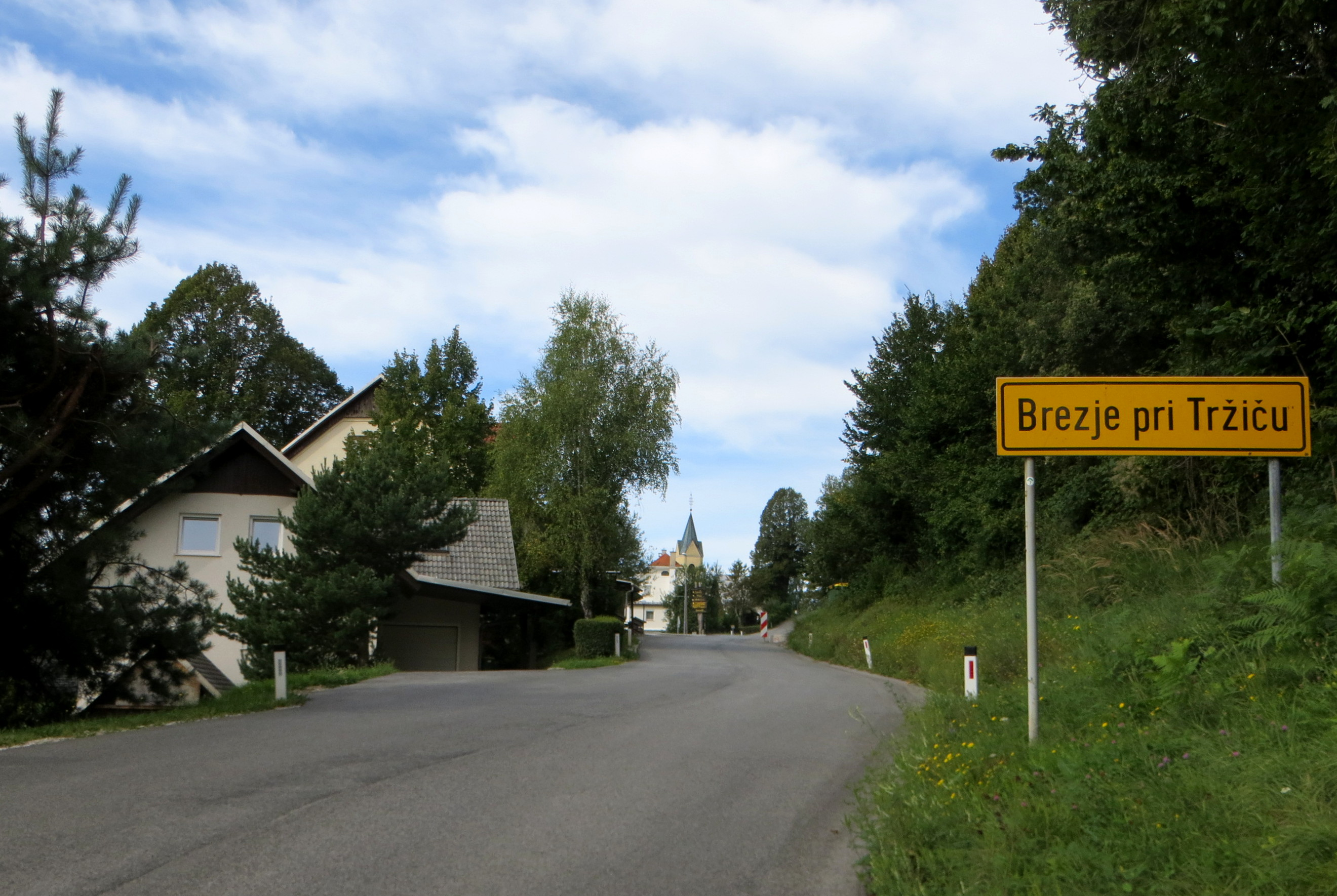
- Brezje pri Tržiču

- Location in Slovenia
- Coordinates: 46°21′32.29″N 14°16′36.12″E
- Country: Slovenia
- Traditional region: Upper Carniola
- Statistical region: Upper Carniola
- Municipality: Tržič
- Elevation: 692.5 m (2,272 ft)

Population (2018)
  - Total: 359

Brezje pri Tržiču (pronounced [ˈbɾeːzjɛ pɾi təɾˈʒiːtʃu]) is a settlement in the Municipality of Tržič in the Upper Carniola region of Slovenia. It is located near the road from Tržič to Begunje. In 2018 it had a population of 359.

== Name ==
Brezje pri Tržiču was attested in written sources as Nabrezi between 1050 and 1065, Bresicz in 1420, Fresiach in 1436, and Sannd Angnes in 1498, among other spellings. The modern name of the settlement was changed from Sveta Neža (literally, 'Saint Agnes') to Brezje pri Tržiču in 1955. The name was changed on the basis of the 1948 Law on Names of Settlements and Designations of Squares, Streets, and Buildings as part of efforts by Slovenia's postwar communist government to remove religious elements from toponyms.

== Church ==
The local church is dedicated to Saint Agnes (Slovene: sveta Neža). The current church was built in 1967 based on plans by the architect Anton Bitenc (1920–1977).
