= Hudo, Tržič =

Hudo
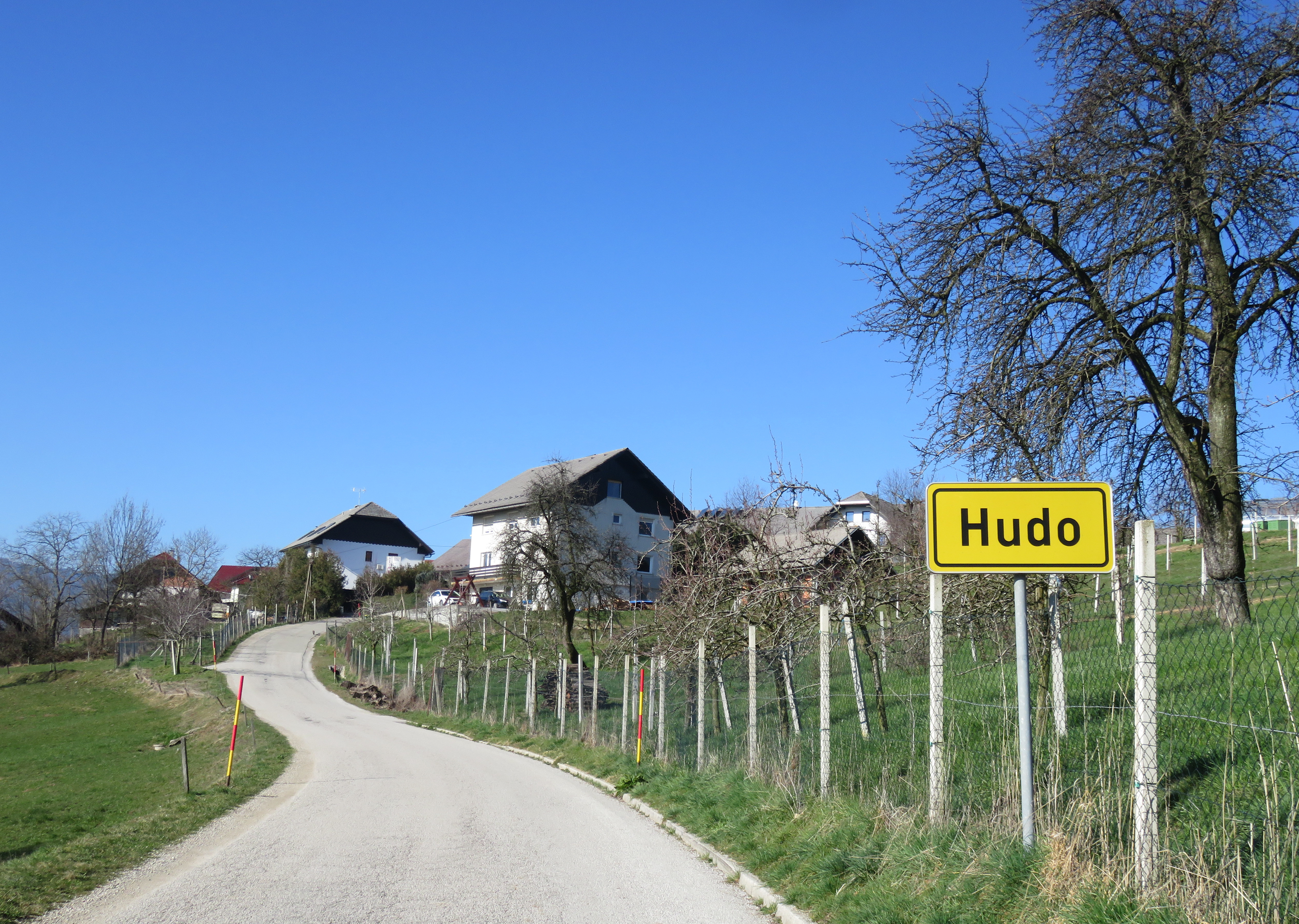

- Location in Slovenia
- Coordinates: 46°20′23.51″N 14°16′19.26″E
- Country: Slovenia
- Traditional region: Upper Carniola
- Statistical region: Upper Carniola
- Municipality: Tržič
- Elevation: 573.3 m (1,881 ft)

Population (2002)
  - Total: 52

Hudo (pronounced [ˈxuːdɔ]) is a village in the Municipality of Tržič in the Upper Carniola region of Slovenia.

== Name ==
Hudo was attested in written records c. 1400 as zu Chudein, and as Chudm in 1498. The name is derived from the adjective hud 'poor, meager', referring to the soil quality.

== Geography ==
Hudo is a scattered village on a ridge and slopes above the Hudo Basin (Slovene: Huško polje) and Hudo Woods (Slovene: Huški gozd). Water is supplied from a catchwork below Mount Vaško (1,046 meters or 3,432 feet).
