= Ribnikar =

Ribnikar (Serbian: Рибникар) is a Slovene and Serbian surname. Notable people with the surname include:

- Franc Ribnikar (1840–1905), Slovene physician
- Vladislav F. Ribnikar (1871–1914), Serbian journalist
- Darko F. Ribnikar (1878–1914), Serbian journalist
- Slobodan F. Ribnikar (1873–1924), Yugoslav journalist and physician
- Jara Ribnikar (1912–2007), Serbian writer
- Vladislav S. Ribnikar (1900–1955), Yugoslav journalist
- Darko V. Ribnikar (1939–2011), Yugoslav and Serbian journalist
