= Jewish volunteers in the Spanish Civil War =

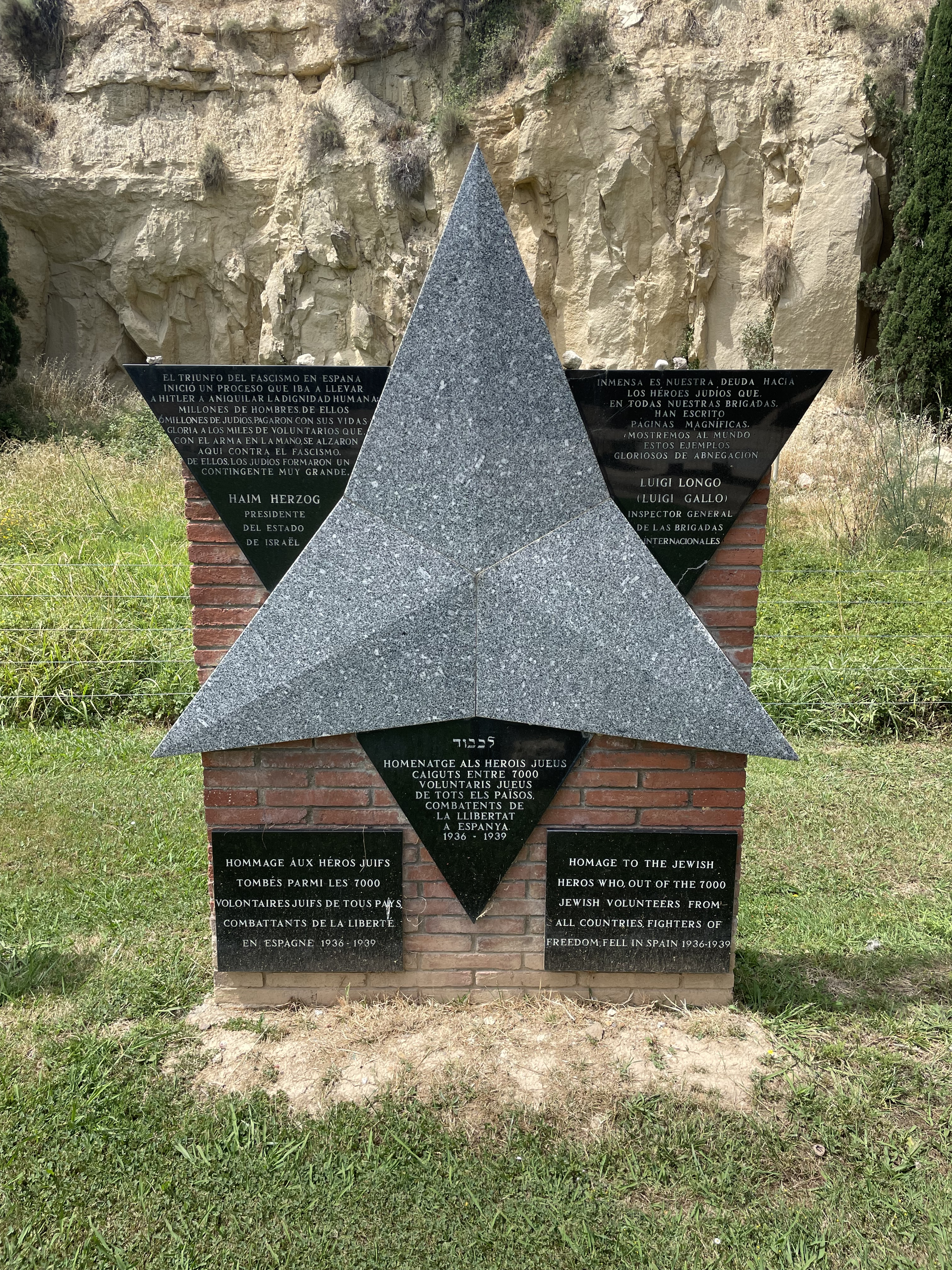
Memorial to Jewish members of the International Brigades at Montjuïc Cemetery, Barcelona

Jewish volunteers in the Spanish Civil War refers to Jews who joined International Brigades and fought in the Spanish Civil War, which erupted on July 17, 1936, and ended on April 1, 1939.

== History ==
The fighting was between the Republicans, who were loyal to the Spanish Republic, and the Nationalists, a rebel group led by General Francisco Franco. The Nationalists prevailed and Franco would rule Spain for the next 36 years. The coup was supported by military units in Morocco, Pamplona, Burgos, Valladolid, Cádiz, Cordova, and Seville. However, barracks in important cities such as Madrid, Barcelona, Valencia, Bilbao and Málaga did not join in the rebellion. Spain was thus left militarily and politically divided. The rebels, led by General Franco, then embarked upon an almost three-year war against the government for the control of the country. The rebel forces received support from the Third Reich, the Kingdom of Italy, and neighboring Portugal, while the Soviet Union and Mexico intervened in support of the Republican side. Other countries, such as the United Kingdom and France, operated an official policy of non-intervention.

A minority of the Jewish population, particularly that of Europe, were active in socialist and Communist organisations in the period between the two World Wars.

They made up a considerable portion of the socialist volunteers, with estimates putting the figure at over ten per cent. Many of them joined the International Brigades and the Popular Front to fight in the Spanish Civil War on the side of the Republicans. The leadership of the International Brigades considered forming an entirely Jewish brigade, but the high casualties made this impossible. However, a Jewish company, the Naftali Botwin Company, was formed within the Palafox Battalion.

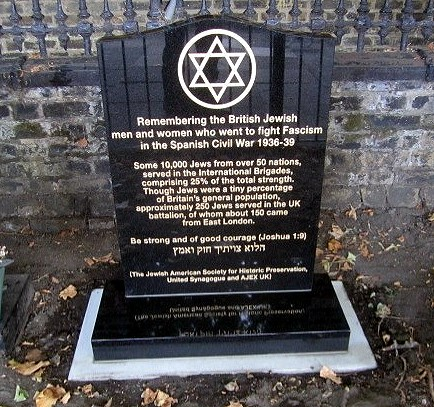
UK Jewish Spanish Civil War Memorial

August, 2026, in commemoration of the 90th anniversary of the beginning of the Spanish Civil War, a first-ever British Jewish memorial to British Jews was sited in London. The marker was a joint effort of the Jewish American Society for Historic Preservation, United Synagogue and AJEX UK. The marker is adjacent to a memorial to Jewish Captain Lionel Lee, a secret WW II British Agent, betrayed and murdered in the Gross Rosen concentration camp in 1944.

The text of the British Jewish Spanish Civil War Memorial:

Remembering the British Jewish men and women who went to fight Fascism in the Spanish Civil War 1936-1939.

Some 10,000 Jews from over 50 nations served in the International Brigades, comprising 25% of the total strength. Though Jews were a tiny percentage of Britain's general population, approximately 250 Jews served in the UK battalion, of whom about 150 came from East London.

Be strong and of good courage (Joshua 1:9)

At least one Jewish volunteer is known to have served with the Nationalists. Emanual Rudolph Vischer was a former Oberleutnant of the Swiss Army who had lived in Spain prior to the Civil War. The official journal of the Swiss Armed Forces reported his death in September 1936.

== National origin of volunteers ==
The table below displays the origin of Jewish volunteers in the International Brigades.

Nationality	Number of volunteers
Poland	2,250
United States	1,250
France	1,043
Palestine	500
Germany	400
Britain	200–400
Belgium	200
Austria-Hungary	120–150
Romania	100–150
Canada	71
Soviet Union	53

According to some estimates, there were 7.758 Jews fighting in the International Brigades. This figure would render them the second largest, or perhaps the largest (if Jewish and other non-French volunteers are deducted from the French contingent) national group in the IB.

== Notable figures ==
- Seweryn Ajzner - later academic and scientist in communist Poland
- Alfred Angiersztajn - later high trade unions official in communist Poland
- Shimon Avidan – Palestinian Jew and future Israeli military officer
- Aleksander Bekier - later high MFA official in communist Poland
- Alfred Brauner – French Austrian communist, scholar and author
- Michał Bron - later high military and MFA official in communist Poland
- Mieczysław Broniatowski - later high security official in communist Poland
- Robert Garland Colodny - later professor and historian
- Julius Deutsch – politician of the Social Democratic Workers' Party of Austria and co-founder and leader of the "Republikanischer Schutzbund"
- Robert Domany – Croatian Partisan and a People's Hero of Yugoslavia
- Gershon Dua-Bogen – later Polish communist party official
- Grzegorz Dzierzgowski - later high military, MFA and economics official in communist Poland
- Fanny Edelman - Argentine communist, later honorary president of the Communist Party of Argentina
- Józef Epstein - Polish communist, later in French resistance
- Stanisław Flato - later high military and MFA official in communist Poland
- Fernando Gerassi – Turkish artist
- Kurt Julius Goldstein – International Brigader, Holocaust survivor, and author
- Szlama Grzywacz - Polish communist, later in French resistance
- David Guest – communist British mathematician and philosopher
- Juliusz Hibner - later high security and interior official in communist Poland
- Salomon Jaszuński - Polish communist
- Bolesław Jeleń - later high military and MFA official in communist Poland
- Alfred Kantorowicz – banned German writer (also known as Helmuth Campe)
- Pinkus Kartin - later in Polish communist resistance
- Lou Kenton – British potter
- Artur Kerschner – Croatian student
- Wacław Komar - later high security and military official in communist Poland
- Franciszek Kriegel - Polish communist, later high health care official in communist Czechoslovakia
- Bert "Yank" Levy – a Canadian who famously used his experience to teach the British Home Guard and wrote a text on guerrilla warfare His service in the Civil War was memorialized in a comic book.
- Eugenia Łozińska - later journalist and propagandist in communist Poland
- Vladimir Majder – Croatian Partisan and communist
- Stanisław Matuszczak - later mid-range party and trade unions official in communist Poland
- Wiktor Mencel - later high MFA official in communist Poland
- Mieczysław Mietkowski - later high security and business official in communist Poland
- Emanuel Mink - Botwin Company commander, later mid-range security official in communist Poland
- George Nathan – Chief of Staff of the XV International Brigade
- Roman Orłowski - later high security official in communist Poland
- Abe Osheroff – American communist
- Valter Roman – Romanian politician
- Carlo Rosselli – headed the Matteotti Battalion
- Leon Rubinsztein - Botwin Company commander, later high security and economics official in communist Poland
- Leon Samet - later high military official in communist Poland
- Alfred Sherman – British journalist and adviser to Margaret Thatcher
- Jack Shulman – American communist
- Mieczysław Skorupiński - later mid-range security and business official in communist Poland
- Manfred Stern alias General Emilio Kléber
- Henryk Sternhel - later in Polish communist resistance
- Mieczysław Szleyen - later high military official in communist Poland
- Zofia Szleyen - later propagandist and translator in communist Poland
- Eugeniusz Szyr - later deputy prime minister and high official in communist Poland
- Drago Štajnberger – Croatian Partisan and a People's Hero of Yugoslavia
- Leonte Tismăneanu - later high ranking official in Communist Romania
- Tristan Tzara - Romanian-French poet, co-founder of the Dadaist movement
- Henryk Toruńczyk - later high security and economics official in communist Poland
- Saul Wellman – political commissar of the Lincoln Battalion and the Washington Battalion
- Milton Wolff – commander of the Lincoln Battalion
- Máté Zalka – Hungarian communist
