= Yugoslav volunteers in the Spanish Civil War =

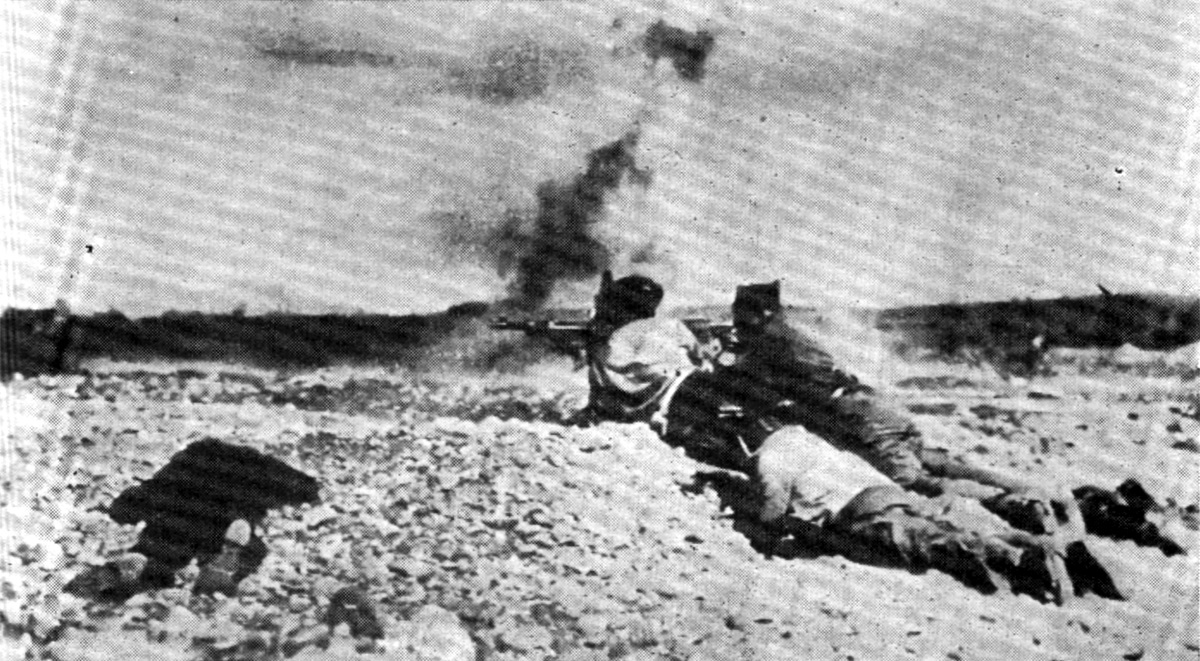
Yugoslav volunteers fighting in Spain, 1937.

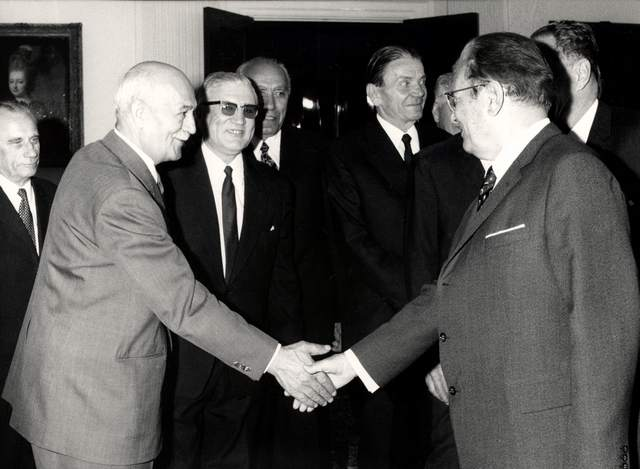
President of Yugoslavia Josip Broz Tito meeting with representatives of the Association of Former Yugoslav Spanish Fighters in 1972.

The Yugoslav volunteers in the Spanish Civil War, known as Spanish fighters (Croatian: Španjolski borci, Slovene: Španski borci, Serbian: Шпански борци / Španski borci) and Yugoslav brigadistas (Spanish: brigadistas yugoslavos), was a contingent of volunteers from the Kingdom of Yugoslavia that fought for the Republicans (in support of the Second Spanish Republic) during the Spanish Civil War (1936–1939).

An estimated 1,700 "Yugoslav brigadistas" fought in the war, including about 800 who were killed in action. According to Spanish statistics, 148 Yugoslav volunteers received the officer rank during the conflict.

Most of them fought in the battalions Dimitrov and Đuro Đaković of the International Brigades, and many of them participated and perished during the Battle of Ebro in 1938. They were recruited by the outlawed Communist Party of Yugoslavia (KPJ) in their home regions, or through the recruitment centre of the Comintern that Josip Broz Tito managed in Paris. There were four airmen among the volunteers, the most notable being fighter pilot Božidar "Boško" Petrović who attained the status of "flying ace."

After the war, those who managed to flee across the Pyrenees fell captive in internment camps in France, with many being repatriated illegally by the Yugoslav communist organisation. Some of them later became leaders of the resistance against the Nazi occupation.

Three former members of the International Brigades ended up commanding armies of the Yugoslav Partisans during World War II: Peko Dapčević (1913–1999), Kosta Nađ (1911–1986) and Petar Drapšin (1914–1945). Koča Popović (1908–1992) was another prominent Partisan commander who fought for the Spanish Republicans.

== Composition ==
The exact number of Yugoslavs who volunteered in Spain is unknown and is still being researched. The Belgrade-based Association of Spanish Fighters, established in 1946, cites a figure of 1,775 confirmed members. It estimates 595 of these were killed in Spain, and another 116 in Yugoslavia during World War II.

The ethnic composition of Yugoslavs is also unknown. A surviving personnel archive of the 129th International Brigade, compiled in Barcelona in May 1938, lists 1,052 people originating from Yugoslavia. Ethnicity data is missing for 140 of them, and the remaining 912 are listed as 48% Croats, 23% Slovenes, 18% Serbs, 3.2% Montenegrins and 1.5% Macedonians.

The matter is further complicated by the fact that only about a quarter (421) is estimated to have come directly from Yugoslavia. The rest were predominantly working class Yugoslavs who had emigrated elsewhere and then came to Spain from other countries, such as France (420), Belgium (191), the Soviet Union (84), Canada (83), the United States (57), and others.

Data about political affiliations of volunteers is also incomplete. Spanish sources say that out of 1,040 Yugoslavs on record some 561 self-described as communists, ten as social-democrats, eight were affiliated with the Croatian Peasant Party and four were anarchists. The remaining 457 had no political affiliation to declare.

== Legacy ==
- A street in New Belgrade, a municipality of Belgrade, the capital of Serbia, bears the name Španskih boraca (Spanish fighters).
- The People's Library in Podgorica, Montenegro is named after Radosav Ljumović, a Montenegrin volunteer in the Spanish Civil War.
- The "Španski Borci" cultural centre in Ljubljana, Slovenia, is named after the Yugoslav volunteers in the Spanish Civil War.

== Notable people ==
- Đorđe Andrejević-Kun (1904–1964)
- Vicko Antić (1912–1999)
- Maksimilijan Baće (1914–2001)
- Spas Bandžov (1904–1942)
- Jakov Baruh (1914–1941)
- Aleš Bebler (1907–1981)
- Imre Beer (1905–1942)
- Vlajko Begović (1905–1989)
- Božo Bilić Marjan (1913–1942)
- Gojko Bjedov (1913–1937)
- Milan Blagojević Španac (1905–1941)
- Stane Bobnar (1912–1986)
- Divko Budak (1897–1941)
- Leopold Caharija (1905–1995)
- Nikola Car Crni (1910–1942)
- August Cesarec (1893–1941)
- Vlado Ćetković (1911–1944)
- Rajko Cibic (1914–2010)
- Rodoljub Čolaković (1900–1983)
- Milan Ćopić (1897–1941)
- Vladimir Ćopić (1891–1939)
- Matija Šiprak (1913–1937)
- Josip Čubrić (1912–1941)
- Vjećeslav Cvetko Flores (1917–1941)
- Stjepan Cvijić (1905–1938)
- Miljenko Cvitković (1914–1943)
- Jovan Đajić (1905–1974)
- Stipe Đerek (1912–1942)
- Božidar Dakić (1909–1941)
- Peko Dapčević (1913–1999)
- Nada Dimitrijević-Nešković (1907–1941)
- Robert Domany (1918–1942)
- Žikica Jovanović Španac (1914–1942)
- Petar Drapšin (1914–1945)
- Stipe Đerek (1912–1942)
- Ivan Gošnjak (1909–1980)
- Ahmet Fetahagić (1914–1944)
- Roman Filipčev (1895–1941)
- Dimitrije Georgijević (1884–1959)
- Jože Gregorčič (1903–1942)
- Gančo Hadžipanzov (1900–1936)
- Ivan Hariš (1903–1989)
- Ljubo Ilić (1905–1994)
- Grga Jankes (1906–1974)
- Fadil Jahić Španac (1910–1942)
- Rudi Janhuba (1914–1976)
- Janko Jovanović (1901–1939)
- Juraj Kalc (1908–1942)
- Svetislav Kanački (1911–1943)
- Čedo Kapor (1914–2004)
- Drago Kobal (1911–1944)
- Viktor Koleša (1884–1946)
- Josip Kopinič (1911–1997)
- Đoko Kovačević (1912–1938)
- Veljko Kovačević (1912–1994)
- Ivan Krajačić (1906–1986)
- Otmar Kreačić (1913–1992)
- Josip Križaj (1911–1948)
- Dušan Kveder (1915–1966)
- Mirko Kovačević (1916–1941)
- Marijan Krajačić (1905–1942)
- Branko Krsmanović (1915–1941)
- Ivan Lenac (1906–1945)
- Lazar Latinović (1915–2006)
- Danilo Lekić (1913–1986)
- Vladimir Majder (1911–1943)
- Jovan Mališić (1902–1939)
- Srećko Manola (1914–1979)
- Mijat Mašković (1910–1937)
- Božidar Maslarić (1895–1963)
- Karlo Mrazović (1902–1987)
- Danko Mitrov (1919–1942)
- Kosta Nađ (1911–1986)
- Guido Nonveiller (1913–2002)
- Gojko Nikoliš (1911–1995)
- Franjo Ogulinac Seljo (1904–1942)
- Marko Orešković (1896–1941)
- Blagoje Parović (1903–1937)
- Ratko Pavlović Ćićko (1913–1943)
- Boško Petrović (1911–1937)
- Miha Pintar Toledo (1913–1942)
- Koča Popović (1908–1992)
- Vlado Popović (1914–1972)
- Svetozar Popović-Milić (1901–1944)
- Vladeta Popović Pinecki (1911–1941)
- Franc Primožič (1915–1963)
- Franjo Puškarić (1908–1937)
- Franc Rozman (1911–1944)
- Ivan Rukavina (1912–1992)
- Mićo Radaković (1915–1941)
- Kornelija Sende-Popović (1914–1941)
- Ante Šarić Rade Španac (1913–1943)
- Drago Štajnberger (1916–1942)
- Izidor Štrok (1911–1984)
- Stane Semič Daki (1915–1985)
- Ivan Turk (1913–1937)
- Vojo Todorović (1914–1990)
- Anton Ukmar (1900–1978)
- Cvetko Uzunovski (1912–1993)
- Lazar Udovički (1915–1997)
- Julio Varesko (1896–1937)
- Ivo Vejvoda (1911–1991)
- Mate Vidaković (1907–1941)
- Veljko Vlahović (1914–1975)
- Đuro Vujović (1901–1943)
- Ratko Vujović (1916–1977)
- Petar Vuksan Pekiša (1905–1941)
- Pavle Vukomanović (1903–1977)
- Tone Žnidaršič (1913–1944)
- Ljubomir Živković Španac (1918–1942)

== Sources ==
- Aleš Bebler (1961). Naši Španci: zbornik fotografija i dokumenata o učešću jugoslovenskih dobrovoljaca u španskom ratu 1936-1939. Španski borci Jugoslavije.
- Savo Pešić (1990). Španjolski građanski rat i KPJ. Izdavački centar Rijeka.
- Krv i život za slobodu: slike iz života i borbe studenata iz Jugoslavije u Španiji. Univerzitet u Beogradu. 1982 [1969].
- Slovenci, španski borci. Komunist. 1982.
- Dragoljub Kuprešanin; Veselinka Kastratović-Ristić; Dušica Knežević; Jelena Bjelajac; Marija Minić (2006). Homenaje a los brigadistas yugoslavos. Belgrade: Muzej istorije Jugoslavije. ISBN 9788684811075.
