= Darko V. Ribnikar =

Serbian journalist (1939–2021)

Davorin Darko S. Ribnikar Даворин Дарко С. Рибникар
- Born: 5. March 1939; Belgrade, Kingdom of Yugoslavia,
- Died: January 2021; Belgrade, Serbia
- Occupation: journalist
- Spouse: Ljiljana Vunjak
- Children: Vladislav D. Ribnikar; Darko D. Ribnikar
- Parent(s): Vladislav S. Ribnikar; Jara Hajek
- Relatives: Vladislav F. Ribnikar (grandfather)

Davorin Darko V. Ribnikar (Serbian Cyrillic: Даворин Дарко В. Рибникар; 5 March 1939 — January 2021) was a Serbian journalist, CEO of the Politika.

== Biography ==
He was born in Belgrade in 1939, as the son of Vladislav Ribnikar, owner of the daily Politika, and his second wife Jara Hajek. He was named after his father's uncle Darko Ribnikar, a journalist, who died as a reserve officer at the beginning of the World War I.

He graduated from the Mixed Gymnasium in Senjak, and then studied at the Faculty of Law in Belgrade, from which he graduated in 1962. He attended postgraduate studies in 1965 and 1966 at Princeton University in the United States.

After returning from the United States, he worked for the Politika. He was the fifth generation of journalist from the Ribnikar family. He worked first as a contributor and editor of the city (1967) and domestic politics section (1970), contributor and acting editor of the foreign politics section (1977) and permanent correspondent of Politika from the Middle East, Paris and New York. As correspondent he lived in Cairo from 1981 to 1986. From 1987 to 1989, he was the editor-in-chief of the Politikin zabavnik, then he was the CEO of the Politika. During his mandate, Politika began to be published in color and marked the centenary of its existence. He contributed to the magazines NIN and Ilustrovana Politika. Also, to the newspapers Dnevnik and Pobjeda. He published articles in the Vjesnik and Oslobođenje.

His feuilletons about Turkey (1978), Poland (1978), Egypt (1983) and on ancient Eastern civilizations (1979) stand out; reports on the war in Lebanon (interviews with Yasser Arafat on the front in 1983), on the military coup in Turkey, political changes in Poland (the first interview with Lech Wałęsa for the Yugoslav press); reports from conferences on Yugoslavia in The Hague, Brussels, Luxembourg, Strasbourg, Paris and Geneva, from 1990 to 1994. As a journalist, he traveled to several countries in Europe, Asia and Africa.

He passed away in Belgrade in January 2021.

== Lawsuit against the Politika ==
He worked in daily Politika since he was 23 years old. After 45 years of work at the newspaper, he was dismissed as redundant and without severance pay. Ribnikar had been in court for more than 13 years against the newspaper Politika and its publisher for violating the moral rights of authors because the new management of Politika, contrary to the agreement signed on March 12, 1997, with the descendants of the founder Vladislav F. Ribnikar, changed the newspaper's title and logo and removed the names from the front page of the founder and CEO's of the newspaper from the Ribnikar family (Darko F. Ribnikar, Slobodan F. Ribnikar and Vladislav S. Ribnikar) from the front page. The Supreme Court of Serbia ruled in favor of the Ribnikar family in November 2020, which Darko Ribnikar learned a few days before his death.

== Awards ==
- Award of the Politika (three times)
- Lifetime Achievement Award of the International Reportage and Media Festival
- Order of President of Romania
- Order of merits for the people with silver rays
