= Vladislav S. Ribnikar =

Yugoslav journalist (1900–1955)

Vladislav S. Ribnikar Владислав С. Рибникар
- Born: 15 June 1900; Belgrade, Kingdom of Serbia,
- Died: 1 December 1955 (aged 55); Belgrade, SFR Yugoslavia
- Occupations: politician, journalist
- Spouse(s): Stana Đurić; Jara Hajek
- Children: 5, including Darko
- Parent(s): Slobodan F. Ribnikar; Danica Živković
- Relatives: Vladislav F. Ribnikar (uncle); Darko F. Ribnikar (uncle)

Vladislav S. Ribnikar (Serbian Cyrillic: Владислав С. Рибникар; 15 June 1900 – 1 December 1955) was a Yugoslav journalist and politician, CEO of the Politika and one of the founders of the Tanjug.

== Biography ==
He was born on 15 June 1900 in Belgrade. He was the son of the physician and journalist Slobodan F. Ribnikar, the middle son of Franc Ribnikar, and the nephew of the journalist and founder of the newspaper Politika, Vladislav F. Ribnikar, after whom he was named.

He began his education in Belgrade, and continued in France during World War I. He wanted to work in art, so he first studied painting in Paris, but at his father's request he enrolled in architecture. He studied at the Sorbonne University, where he graduated in 1922. After the death of the Ribnikar brothers - Vladislav F. and Darko F., during World War I, his father Slobodan became CEO of the Politika after the war. After his father's death, in 1924, Vladislav became the head of the Politika and during the interwar period he raised it to the most read newspaper in the Kingdom of Yugoslavia. The newspaper has had an anti-fascist orientation since the 1930s.

At the beginning of his work at Politika, still ignorant of the practical side of journalism, he entrusted the management of the paper, especially the editing of the political pages, to journalist Milan Gavrilović, and devoted himself to the improvement of the cultural and social sections. He also accepted other journalistic duties, such as reporting from the cities of neighboring countries, first of all Sofia. He traveled to several European countries and wrote about them, and in 1927 he traveled to Moscow, the capital of the Soviet Union, then the first socialist country. From the capital of the USSR, at a time when Belgrade did not maintain diplomatic relations with Moscow, he wrote interesting articles in the intersection of political, sociological and economic facts, which the newspaper placed as editorials.

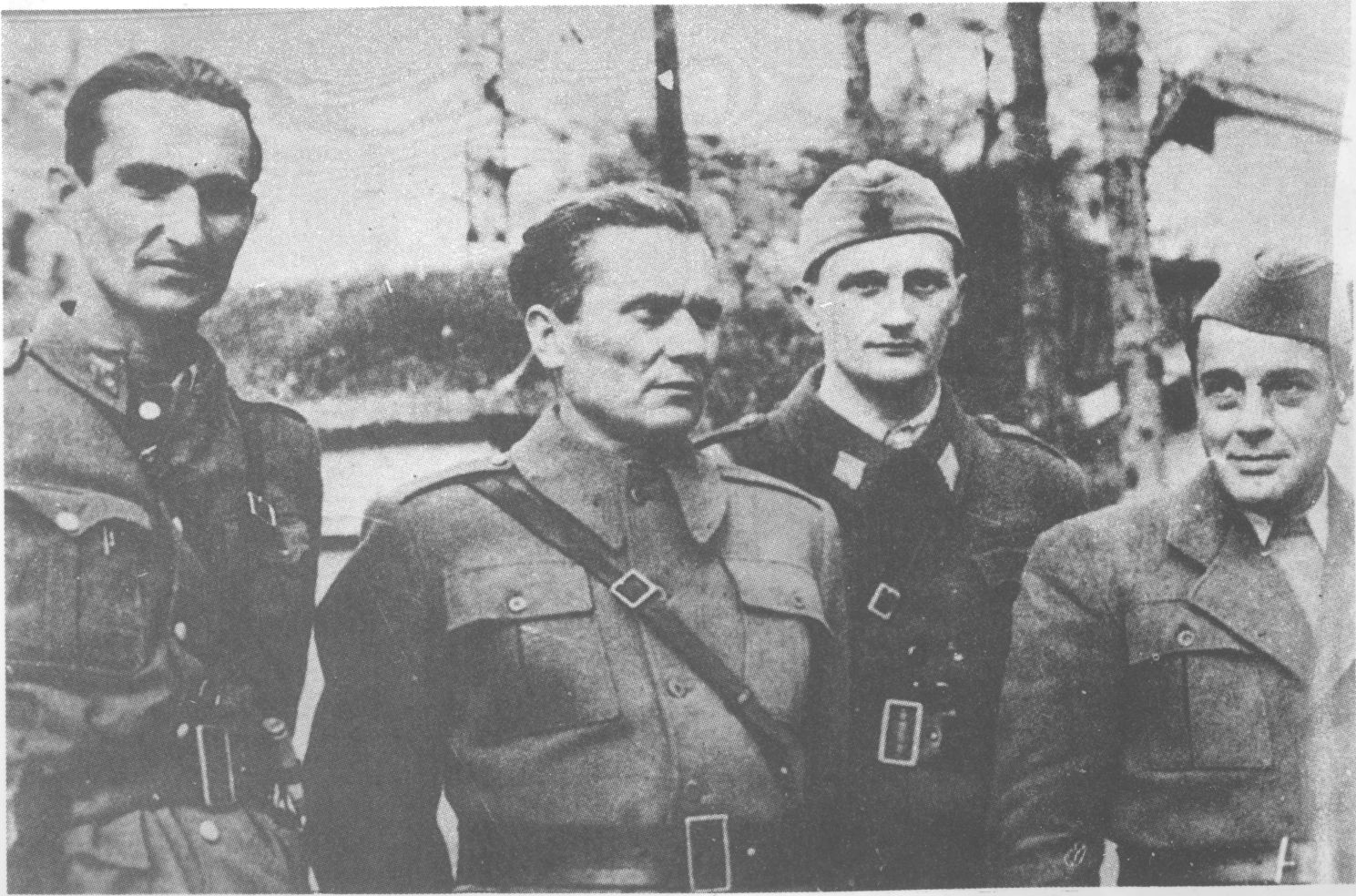
Josip Broz Tito with Josip Mažar, Todor Vujasinović and Vladislav Ribnikar in Jajce, 1943

In November 1943, in Jajce, together with Moša Pijade, he was one of the founders of the Tanjug and its first CEO. At the end of the same month, he was a councilor at the Second Session of AVNOJ, where he was elected a member of the Presidency of AVNOJ and a member of the National Committee for the Liberation of Yugoslavia (NKOJ), where he was vice-president and commissioner for information. In October 1944, he came from Vis first to the liberated Aranđelovac, and from there to Belgrade, with the task of renewing the publication of Politika. From Wednesday, 25 October to Saturday, 28 October, he organized the work of the editorial office, administration, printing press and expedition for the first postal issue - 11,798. since the establishment of the paper.

After the liberation of Yugoslavia, he was the minister of education in the Provisional Government of Yugoslavia, and from 1946 the president of the Committee for Culture and Art. From 1948 to 1951 he was the chairman of the Committee for Cinematography, a member of the Presidium of the National Assembly of Yugoslavia and the Central Committee of the People's Front of Yugoslavia, and from 1953 he was the chairman of the Yugoslav Red Cross. In 1947, he was a delegate of Yugoslavia at the sessions of the General Assembly of the United Nations and UNESCO, where for a time he was a member of the Executive Council. From the liberation of Yugoslavia until his death, he was the CEO of Politika.

== Legacy ==
Vladislav Ribnikar has a school named after him in Belgrade. There occurred a tragic school shooting on 3 May 2023, at Vladislav Ribnikar Model Elementary School in the Vračar municipality of Belgrade. The shooter, identified as a 13-year-old Kosta Kecmanović, opened fire on pupils and staff, resulting in the deaths of ten individuals, including nine pupils and a security guard. Six others, five pupils and a teacher, also sustained injuries.
