= Three for Happiness =

- Za srecu je potrebno troje DVD cover
- Za sreću je potrebno troje
- Directed by: Rajko Grlić
- Written by: Rajko Grlić; Dubravka Ugrešić
- Produced by: Sulejman Kapić
- Starring: Mira Furlan; Miki Manojlović; Dubravka Ostojić; Bogdan Diklić; Vanja Drach
- Cinematography: Živko Zalar
- Edited by: Živka Toplak
- Music by: Bodan Arsovski; Vlatko Stefanovski
- Production companies: Centar Film; Jadran Film
- Release date: November 7, 1985 (Yugoslavia)
- Running time: 100 minutes
- Country: Yugoslavia
- Language: Serbo-Croatian

Three for Happiness (a.k.a. Three's Happiness) (Croatian: Za sreću je potrebno troje) is a 1985 Croatian romantic drama film directed by Rajko Grlić.

== Plot ==
A man (Miki Manojlović) is forced by poverty and desperation to use a children's plastic gun to rob a small bank and gets captured. Three years later, he is released from prison. He starts a romantic relationship with Zdenka, a factory worker, but still has strong feelings for his ex-wife Nina, who is now a mistress of Ivan, a well-to-do man. At the same time, Zdenka remains the love interest of Jozo, the factory doorkeeper...

== Cast ==
- Miki Manojlović as Drago
- Mira Furlan as Zdenka Robić
- Bogdan Diklić as Jozo
- Vanja Drach as Ivan
- Dušan Jovanović as Željezničar
- Miodrag Krivokapić as Montenegrin Ticket Buyer
- Dubravka Ostojić as Nina Korbar
- Ksenija Pajić as Jagoda ("Strawberry")
- Mladen Budiščak as Pilar ("Sawyer")
- Nina Erak-Svrtan as Shoe Factory Shift Leader
- Drago Krča as Judge
- Vitomira Lončar as Telephone Operator
- Lana Golob as Shoe Factory Worker
- Mladen Crnobrnja as Krojač ("Tailor")
- Jadranka Matković as Shoe Factory Worker
- Damir Saban as Shoe Factory Worker
- Ljudevit Galić as Train Ticket Agent

== Reception ==
The film won the FIPRESCI, Grand Prix and the Peter Karsten award for 'Best Script' by the International Federation of Film Critics for Rajko Grlić at the 1986 Valencia Festival of Mediterranean Cinema. It also won the Grand Prix at the Salso Film Festival in Italy, and many awards from Yugoslavian film festivals, including the Golden Arena for Scenography at the 1986 Pula Film Festival. The film was distributed in 14 countries.

Croatian film historian Ivo Škrabalo compared Three for Happiness unfavorably to Grlić's earlier works, noting more simplistic direction and failure to fulfill the genre's determinants. Škrabalo also remarked that the film steers clear of a more pronounced social criticism, limiting itself to showing contrast between social backgrounds.

Eleanor Mannikka of All Movie Guide wrote that the film "is an amusing and enjoyable romantic comedy buoyed by witty dialogue."
