= Jara Ribnikar =

Jara Ribnikar (Serbian Cyrillic: Јара Рибникар; born Jaroslava Hájková; 23 August 1912 – 30 April 2007) was a Yugoslavian and Serbian writer, translator, partisan fighter and politician. She was the second wife of Vladislav S. Ribnikar, journalist and editor-in-chief of Politika, member of the prominent Ribnikar family. She wrote novels, memoires, short stories and poems. Jara Ribnikar was vice-president of the Serbian Literary Guild, president of Serbian (1966–1980) and Yugoslavian PEN Centres and member of the Council of Peoples of the Federal People's Assembly.

== Biography ==
Ribnikar was born Jaroslava Hájková in Hradec Králové in Bohemia, her father was pianist and composer Emil Hájek. The family moved to Belgrade, Yugoslavia, when Ribnikar was a child. In Belgrade, she married Vladislav S. Ribnikar, one of the owners of the Politika newspapers. In the interwar Yugoslavia, Vladislav supported the clandestine Communist Party of Yugoslavia. In 1941, the meeting of the communist leadership was held in the home of Vladislav and Jara Ribnikar in Dedinje. At this meeting, the decision to start the National Liberation War was made.

From the beginning of the war, the Ribnikars were members of the Partisans. Jara Ribnikar worked for the Partisans' Supreme Staff and was present in Jajce during the Second session of the AVNOJ in November 1943. There, her husband Vladislav and Moša Pijade established TANJUG, a Partisan news agency. Jara Ribnikar became member of the TANJUG staff.

Between 1948 and 1965, Jara Ribnikar was editor of the artistic journal "Jugoslavija". In this period, she published her first poems under a pen name Dušanka Radak. After Vladislav's death in 1955, Jara started writing prose. She wrote a dozen novels and several short story collections. Her best known novel was Jan Nepomucki (1969) for which was among the finalists for the NIN Award. Between 1979 and 1991, she published five volumes of memoirs.

In the 1990s, Ribnikar became proponent of the transcendental meditation and supported pro-Milošević party Yugoslav Left. Ribnikar died in Belgrade's Dragiša Mišović Hospital on 30 April 2007.

== Works ==
=== Poem collections ===
- Idu dani, noći, dani, 1952

=== Novels ===
- Nedovršeni krug, 1954
- Zašto vam je unakaženo lice, 1956
- Bakaruša, 1961
- Pobeda i poraz, 1963
- Ti, 1963
- Ja, ti, mi, 1967
- Jan Nepomucki, 1969
- Priviđenja, 1976
- Kratko beogradsko proleće, 1977
- Porodične priče, 1995
- Roman o T. M., 1998
- Skretnica, 2001

=== Short story collections ===
- Devetog dana, 1953
- Largo, 1957
- Među nama, 1973
- Ženske ljubavne priče, 1997

=== Memoirs ===
- Život i priča I–V, 1979–1995
- Dete iz Hradeca, 1990
