= Franc Ribnikar =

Slovenian physician and philanthropist (1840–1905)

- Born: 1840; Senično, Austrian Empire
- Died: 1905 (aged 64–65); Belgrade, Kingdom of Yugoslavia
- Occupation: physician
- Spouse: Milica Srnić
- Children: Vladislav F. Ribnikar; Slobodan F. Ribnikar; Darko F. Ribnikar

Franc Ribnikar (1840–1905) was a Slovene physician. His son Vladislav F. Ribnikar is the founder of Politika.

== Biography ==
He was born in 1840 in Senično in Carniola (then Austrian Empire) to father Jernej Ribnikar and mother Marija Ahačič. He studied medicine in Graz, where he obtained a master's degree in surgery and obstetrics. Then he moved to Hrvatska Kostajnica and there married Milica Srnić. In 1867 he went to Serbia and in 1869 he became an assistant in the district hospital in Kruševac. He then continued his career in Trstenik (1870) and Svilajnac (1873). He had three sons with Marija: the eldest was the famous journalist Vladislav, the founder of Politika; then, Slobodan, also a physician and journalist; the third was Davorin Darko, a Politika correspondent killed in battle on the front against the Austrian Army in the World War I.

Franc Ribnikar participated in the Serbian–Ottoman Wars. In 1882, he received his doctorate in medicine in Zurich, where he was appointed director of the district hospital in Jagodina. In 1888, he received Serbian citizenship and moved to Belgrade, a city where he would practice as a doctor until his death in 1905 at the age of 67.
