= Danko Grlić =

Danko Grlić (18 September 1923 – 1 March 1984) was a Marxist humanist, and a member of the Praxis school of SFR Yugoslavia.

He was born in Gračanica, Bosnia and Herzegovina. He moved to Zagreb with his family in 1931. During the Second World War he joined the anti-fascist struggle. He appreciated freedom above all, so due to his liberal expression, he often came to conflict with the government, which ended very badly for him. Because he did not entirely oppose the resolution of Cominform, he was sentenced to three months in the prison camp Goli otok in 1948. Grlić did not accept the resolution, but for one part he held that it was correct, - where it says there is not enough democracy in the Yugoslav Communist Party. Upon returning from Goli otok he accepted a number of minor jobs; he translated, wrote, even under a false name. A story is still circulating, that he wrote an essay for Franjo Tudjman's book "The war against war". He was paid a fee by Tudjman, but is not cited as the author, although being acknowledged at the end of the book.

From 1950 to 1955 Grlić studied philosophy at the University of Zagreb. In 1959 he accepted Miroslav Krleža's offer to work at the Yugoslavian Lexicographic Agency. In 1965 he was one of the founding members of the Praxis journal. From 1966 to 1968 Grlić was president of the Croatian Philosophical Society. In 1969 he earned the PhD degree with his work “The Founding Thought of Friedrich Nietzsche”.

Grlić started his academic career in 1962 teaching aesthetics at the Academy of Arts in Zagreb. He taught there until 1968, when he was forbidden to teach at this institution. He continued his academic career in 1971, when he was elected for professor at the University of Belgrade Faculty of Philosophy, and in 1974 he moved to the Faculty of Philosophy in Zagreb, where he was head of the department of aesthetics until his death in 1984.

His Selected Works in four volumes were published in 1988, and in 1989 a collection of articles in his honour were published in Zagreb, titled The Art and the Revolution.

He was married to Eva Grlić with whom he had a son Rajko Grlić, Croatian film director and producer.

== Major works ==
Grlić represented critical Marxist positions typical for the whole Praxis school. After Marx, Grlić's favourite author was Friedrich Nietzsche. He wanted to overcome the negative image of Nietzsche in Marxist cycles, claiming that the Nazi’s version of Nietzsche's thoughts wasn't the essence of his thought.

The major field of scientific interest of Grlić was aesthetics. He is author of the four-volume Study of aesthetics, published in the period of 1974–1979.

Other works included:

- Dictionary of Philosophers (1968)
- Contra Dogmaticos (1971)
- Friedrich Nietzsche (1981)
- The Challenge of the Negative: to the aesthetics of Theodor Adorno (1986, posthumous)
