= In the Jaws of Life =

- Cover of the Facets Video VHS release
- Serbo-Croatian: U raljama života
- Directed by: Rajko Grlić
- Written by: Rajko Grlić; Dubravka Ugrešić
- Based on: Steffie Speck in the Jaws of Life by Dubravka Ugrešić
- Starring: Gorica Popović; Vitomira Lončar; Bogdan Diklić; Miodrag Krivokapić; Mira Furlan; Semka Sokolović-Bertok; Miki Manojlović; Bata Živojinović; Rade Šerbedžija
- Cinematography: Tomislav Pinter
- Edited by: Živka Toplak
- Music by: Brane Živković
- Release date: 4 April 1984
- Running time: 95 minutes
- Country: Yugoslavia
- Language: Serbo-Croatian

In the Jaws of Life (Croatian: U raljama života) is a 1984 Yugoslav film directed by Rajko Grlić. It is based on a novel by Dubravka Ugrešić.

The film was released on VHS in the United States by Facets Video in November 1998.

== Plot ==
Dunja (Gorica Popović), a television director is editing a TV series about Štefica Cvek (Vitomira Lončar), an introverted and unassuming office worker who lives in a world of romance novels and women's magazines, seeking out for a real man. Dunja's relationship with Sale (Miodrag Krivokapić), a literary critic and party ideologue, is facing a crisis, so she finds herself in a situation similar to that of her on-screen protagonist...
