= Biserka Matić Spasojević =

Serbian politician

Biserka Matić Spasojević (Serbian Cyrillic: Бисерка Матић Спасојевић; born 1937), formerly known as Biserka Matić, is a retired Serbian journalist, politician, and diplomat. She wrote for Politika and was a cabinet minister in the transitional government established after the fall of Slobodan Milošević in October 2000.

== Early life ==
Matić Spasojević holds a degree in Yugoslavian and world literature from the University of Belgrade Faculty of Philosophy.

== Journalist ==
Matić Spasojević wrote for Politika over a period of several years, often focusing on political and economic matters at the federal level in the Socialist Federal Republic of Yugoslavia (SFRY) and its successor state, of a sort, the Federal Republic of Yugoslavia (FRY). In December 1989, she was one of thirty-five Politika journalists who signed an public appeal calling for the restoration of multi-party democracy and condemning the "forcible division" of Yugoslavians along ethnic and religious lines. (Although Serbia formally returned to multi-party democracy in 1990, its political culture over the next decade was dominated by the authoritarian rule of Socialist Party of Serbia (SPS) president Slobodan Milošević and his allies.)

In January 1990, Matić Spasojević became a founding member of the Association of Journalists of Yugoslavia. She later became active with the Independent Journalists' Association of Serbia (NUNS).

Although Politika was broadly under the control of Milošević's allies in the 1990s, Matić Spasojević was known as an independent journalist, critical of the regime and not willing to conform to the paper's official line. In June 1990, she was one of a number of Politika workers who signed an open letter accusing the paper of presenting distorted coverage of recent opposition protests in Belgrade. In March of the following year, she accused editor-in-chief Živorad Minović of pursuing a campaign of "violence against the truth" and called for his dismissal. She later accused Radoman Božović of seeking to discipline journalists on behalf of the government.

Matić Spasojević was one of forty Politika journalists who signed a letter of protest against the paper's coverage of the 1996 Serbian local elections and the anti-government protests that followed. She also called for the resignation of Minović's successor Hadži Dragan Antić in this period, describing Politika under his leadership as having "completely turned its back on [...] everything that conflicts with the interests of the regime." By January 1997, she had been suspended from the paper.

In a media analysis of Politika published in June 2000, Matić Spasojević accused the paper of being "directly involved in repression" on behalf of the regime.

== Cabinet minister and government representative ==
Milošević was defeated by Vojislav Koštunica of the Democratic Opposition of Serbia (DOS) in the 2000 Yugoslavian presidential election and subsequently fell from power on 5 October 2000. Serbia's republican government also fell after the election, and a transitional administration was established on 24 October 2000 pending a new parliamentary election; the new government included the Socialist Party, the DOS, and the Serbian Renewal Movement (SPO). Matic Spasojević was appointed as one of three co-ministers of information, representing the DOS at the recommendation of the NUNS. During this period, she was a member of the Democratic Alternative (DA), one of the parties in the DOS coalition. She said that the information ministry would seek to stop enforcement of the previous regime's Law on Public Information, which she described as "the worst on the planet, due to its draconian penalties and harsh sentences."

Matić Spasojević also served on a coordination body of the federal (Yugoslavian) and republican (Serbian) governments to resolve the insurgency in the Preševo Valley. In late December 2000, she said that Albanian militants (whom she described as "terrorists") would need to remove a checkpoint they had set up at the entrance to the village of Veliki Trnovac and lay down their arms, or they would be expelled by force.

The DOS won a landslide victory in the 2000 Serbian parliamentary election and formed a new administration on 24 January 2001. Matić Spasojević was not a candidate in the election and stood down as a minister at this time. She initially remained a member of the federal–republican coordination body for the Preševo Valley and worked to resolve the insurgency via diplomatic means. In February 2001, she urged the North Atlantic Treaty Organization (NATO) to support the coordination body's proposal for the region, saying "without that support there is no peaceful solution." The insurgency ultimately ended with the signing of the Končulj Agreement on 20 May 2001.

Matić Spasojević welcomed the arrest of Slobodan Milošević on 1 April 2001, saying "justice has been served" and adding that Serbia could now take its place among the ranks of "modern, well-organized, democratic European states."

== Diplomat ==
Matić Spasojević was appointed as the Federal Republic of Yugoslavia's ambassador to the Republic of Macedonia (now North Macedonia) in early 2001. She formally presented her credentials to Macedonian president Boris Trajkovski on 11 May of that year. In August 2001, she warned that the irredentist Albanian National Army (ANA) paramilitary group would not limit its military operations to the ongoing insurgency in Macedonia but would also seek to create new crises in Greece and Montenegro.

Matić Spasojević continued serving as ambassador to Macedonia after Yugoslavia was restructured as the State Union of Serbia and Montenegro in February 2003. Her term ended in April 2005.
