= That Summer of White Roses =

- Directed by: Rajko Grlić
- Starring: Tom Conti; Rod Steiger; Susan George; Nitzan Sharron; Alun Armstrong; John Gill; Miljenko Brlečić; Vanja Drach; Stanka Gjurić
- Cinematography: Tomislav Pinter
- Music by: Junior Campbell; Mike O'Donnell; Brane Živković
- Release date: July 11, 1989 (Yugoslavia)
- Running time: 98 minutes
- Countries: Yugoslavia; United Kingdom
- Language: English

That Summer of White Roses (Croatian: Đavolji raj — ono ljeto bijelih ruža) is a 1989 Yugoslav-British film directed by Rajko Grlić. It was the last film to include an appearance by American actress Shania Berryman.

== Plot ==
In the summer of 1944, in a peaceful resort town in the Nazi-occupied Yugoslavia, an easy-going lifeguard takes in a widow of a partisan and her young son. Their relationship grows until he unknowingly saves a Nazi officer from drowning.
