= Eva Grlić =

Croatian journalist and writer (1920–2008)

- Born: Eva Izrael; 1920; Budapest, Kingdom of Hungary
- Died: 31 July 2008 (aged 87–88); Zagreb, Croatia
- Occupations: Journalist; writer
- Spouses: Rudolf Domany (widowed); Danko Grlić
- Children: 2, including Rajko
- Parents: Oskar Ješua Izrael; Katica Klingenberg

Eva Grlić (née Izrael; 1920 – 31 July 2008) was a Croatian journalist and writer, mother of famous Croatian film director and producer Rajko Grlić.

== Early life and education ==
Grlić was born in Budapest to a Jewish family. Her father Oskar (Osias) Ješua Izrael, was Sephardi Jew and her mother Katica Klingenberg, was Ashkenazi Jew. She was taught Ladino language and Jewish customs. Grlić learned Hungarian from her mother, and Bosnian from her father. She spent her childhood and adolescence in Sarajevo.

As a teenager in Sarajevo Grlić belonged to left-oriented circles, and with them she went on an organized tours, or winter skiing. After the 1929 Yugoslav dictatorship, the police got hold of letters that were sent to her from Spain by her boyfriend Miljenko Cvitković, a volunteer who had joined the International Brigades in the Spanish Civil War. Because of those letters, Grlić was banned from pursuing further education anywhere on the territory of the Kingdom of Yugoslavia.

In 1938, she moved with her family to Zagreb. In Zagreb, she attended and completed a steno-typing course and then worked as a secretary at several companies.

== World War II, later life and career ==
In April 1940 Grlić married Rudolf Domany, brother of Robert Domany, with whom she had a daughter, Vesna Domany Hardy, born in May 1941. Her husband Rudolf was killed by Ustaše in September 1941. In the meantime, she and other members of her immediate family had their apartments in the center of Zagreb expropriated, so with her daughter, mother, grandmother Tereza Kohn and her late husband's parents, the widowed Grlić moved into the apartment of her husband's cousin, Antonia Špicner.

In February 1942, the Ustaša regime started rounding up and deporting the remaining Jews still living in Zagreb, and out of the entire family it was only Grlić, her daughter and mother who managed to avoid arrest. Grlić soon joined the Partisans, where she started writing for ZAVNOH newspaper Vjesnik. During the war, Oto and Ruža Fuchs took care of Grlić's daughter. Ruža Fuchs was later named Righteous Among the Nations in 1987.

Grlić's mother also joined the Partisans and was killed during Operation Trio in Bosnia in 1942. The rest of their family perished during the Holocaust, among them her father. Only Grlić, her uncle Moše Izrael and her daughter have survived. In 1945, Grlić returned to Zagreb to be reunited with her daughter, who was four at the time.

From 1945 to 1949, Grlić worked with many newspapers, among them Vjesnik and Naprijed. For three years, Grlić was imprisoned at the Goli Otok prison as the political enemy of the SFR Yugoslavia. Grlić also worked as a translator from German and Hungarian. In 1998, Grlić published the autobiographical fiction Sjećanje about her life before and after the war, as leftist. Sjećanje was also published in Hungarian and Italian language. Her second husband was Zagreb Marxist humanist and philosopher Danko Grlić, with whom she had an only child, son Rajko. In 2002, Grlić published the book Putnik za Krakow i druge priče. Grlić died on 31 July 2008 in Zagreb and was buried at the Mirogoj Cemetery.

== Published works ==
- Sjećanje, Durieux, 1998
- Putnik za Krakow i druge priče, Durieux, 2002

== Bibliography ==
- Kraus, Ognjen (1998). Dva stoljeća povijesti i kulture Židova u Zagrebu i Hrvatskoj. Zagreb: Židovska općina Zagreb. ISBN 953-96836-2-9.
- Snješka Knežević, Aleksander Laslo (2011). Židovski Zagreb. Zagreb: AGM, Židovska općina Zagreb. ISBN 978-953-174-393-8.
