= Boško Petrović (aviator) =

Association football player

Božidar "Boško" Petrović
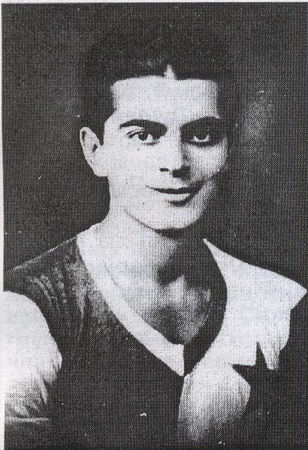
- Born: 7 April 1911; Bela Palanka, Kingdom of Serbia
- Died: 12 July 1937 (aged 26); Villanueva de la Cañada, Spain
- Education: University of Belgrade
- Military career
- Allegiance: Kingdom of Yugoslavia; Spanish Republic
- Branch: Royal Yugoslav Air Force; Spanish Republican Air Force
- Service years: 1936–1937
- Rank: Lieutenant
- Nickname: Fernández García
- Units: 2ª Escuadrilla, Grupo 12
- Conflicts: Spanish Civil War; Siege of Madrid; Battle of Brunete †
Association football career
- Position: Midfielder
Senior career*
Years	Team	Apps	(Gls)
- BASK
1932–1934	Vojvodina		
1934–1936	Jugoslavija		
International career
1934	Yugoslavia	1	(0)
- * Club domestic league appearances and goals

Božidar "Boško" Petrović (7 April 1911 – 12 July 1937) was a Yugoslav fighter ace of the Spanish Civil War and professional footballer.

== Biography ==
Boško Petrović was born in Bela Palanka, then part of the Kingdom of Serbia, in 1911. After completing his secondary education, he enrolled at the University of Belgrade, where he studied law. While a student, Petrović also began his football career, first playing for Belgrade clubs FK BASK and BUSK before joining FK Vojvodina in 1932. In 1934, he moved to SK Jugoslavija, one of the leading clubs in the country, where he played until 1936. That same year, he represented the Yugoslavia national football team in an international match against France in Paris. Around this period, he also became a member of the then-illegal Communist Party of Yugoslavia.

After graduating from university, Petrović joined the Royal Yugoslav Air Force and was stationed in Novi Sad as a pilot cadet. During a football trip to Paris in 1936, he took the opportunity to test several new aircraft models, including the Hawker Fury.

Following the outbreak of the Spanish Civil War, Petrović volunteered to fight for the Second Spanish Republic, traveling to Spain with his friend Sreten Dudić under the pseudonym "Fernández García." Upon arrival, they underwent a 26-day training course in Albacete before being deployed to the front lines. Petrović participated in several major engagements, including the Siege of Madrid, and was credited as a flying ace with five confirmed aerial victories. He was killed in action on 12 July 1937, the same day he achieved his fifth victory. Shortly after his death, his brother Dobre arrived in Spain and joined the same squadron.

Following the establishment of a communist government in Yugoslavia after World War II, Petrović was commemorated as a national hero. Several streets were named in his honor, and a memorial plaque dedicated to him was installed at Partizan Stadium.

== See also ==
- Yugoslav volunteers in the Spanish Civil War
- List of Spanish Civil War flying aces
