= Dubravka Ugrešić =

Croatian/ Bulgarian writer (1949–2023)

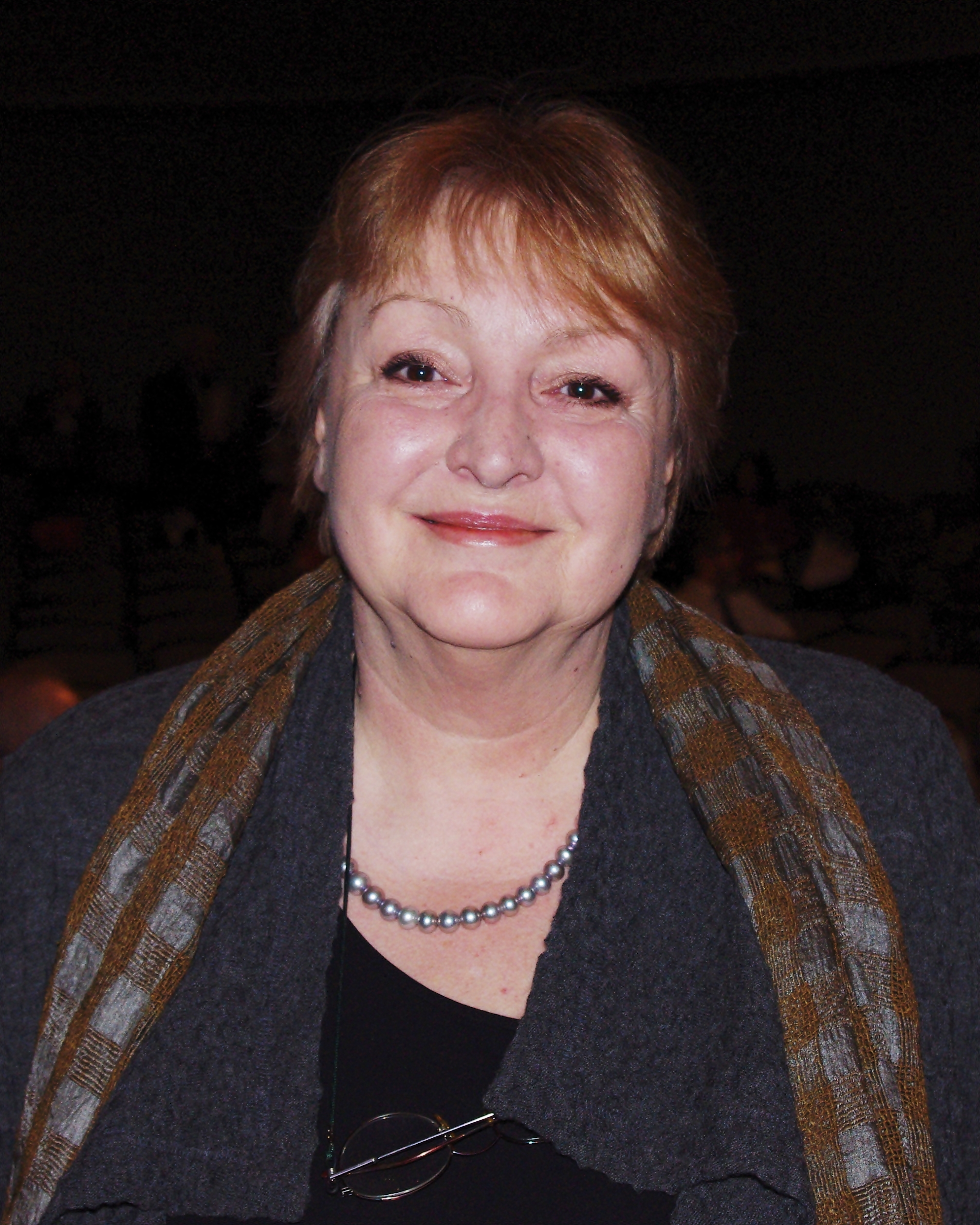
- Born: 27 March 1949; Kutina, PR Croatia, FPR Yugoslavia
- Died: 17 March 2023 (aged 73); Amsterdam, Netherlands
- Occupation: Writer
- Writing career
- Notable awards: NIN Award; 1988; Neustadt International Prize for Literature; 2016; Vilenica Prize; 2016
- Website: Official Website

Dubravka Ugrešić (Croatian: [dûbraːvka ûgreʃit͡ɕ]; 27 March 1949 – 17 March 2023) was a Yugoslav-Croatian and Dutch writer. (Note: Born in Kutina, PR Croatia, part of the federal Yugoslavia at the time, Ugrešić explicitly rejected ethnic and national labels following the dissolution of Yugoslavia and identified as a Yugoslav writer throughout her life. She was a Croatian citizen from 1990, settled in the Netherlands. She also acquired a Dutch citizenship.) A graduate of University of Zagreb, she was based in Amsterdam from 1996 and continued to identify as a Yugoslav writer.

== Early life and education ==
Ugrešić was born on 27 March 1949 in Kutina, Yugoslavia (now Croatia). She was born into an ethnically mixed family; her mother was an ethnic Bulgarian from Varna. She majored in comparative literature and Russian language at the University of Zagreb's Faculty of Arts, pursuing parallel careers as a scholar and as a writer. After graduation, she continued to work at the university, at the Institute for Theory of Literature. In 1993, she left Croatia for political reasons. She spent time teaching at European and American universities, including UNC-Chapel Hill, UCLA, Harvard University, Wesleyan University, and Columbia University. She was based in Amsterdam where she was a freelance writer and contributor to several American and European literary magazines and newspapers.

== Writing ==
=== Novels and short stories ===
Dubravka Ugrešić published novels and short story collections. Her novella Steffie Speck in the Jaws of Life (Croatian: Štefica Cvek u raljama života) was published in 1981. Filled with references to works of both high literature (by authors such as Gustave Flaubert and Bohumil Hrabal) and trivial genres (such as romance novels and chick lit), it represents a sophisticated and lighthearted postmodern play with the traditional concept of the novel. It follows a young typist named Steffie Speck, whose name was taken from a Dear Abby column, as she searches for love, both parodying and being compelled by the kitschy elements of romance. The novel was made into a successful 1984 Yugoslav film In the Jaws of Life, directed by Rajko Grlić.

Regarding her writing, Ugrešić remarked:

... Great literary pieces are great because, among other things, they are in permanent polemics with their readers, some of whom are writers, and who are able to themselves express creatively their sense of this literary affair. Great literary pieces have that specific magical quality of provoking readers to rewrite them, to make a new literary project out of them. That could be the Borgesian idea that each book should have its counterpart, but also a Modernist idea of literature which is in constant dialog with its literary, historical past.

Her novel Fording the Stream of Consciousness received the NIN Award in 1988, the highest literary honor in former Yugoslavia, whose winners include Danilo Kiš and Milorad Pavić; Ugrešić was the first woman to be awarded the prize. The novel is Bulgakov-like "thriller" about an international "family of writers" who gather at a conference in Zagreb during Yugoslavian times. Museum of Unconditional Surrender is a novel about the melancholy of remembrance and forgetting. A female narrator, an exile, surrounded by scenery of post-Wall Berlin and images of her war-torn country Yugoslavia, constantly changes the time zones of her life, past and present.

Set in Amsterdam, Ministry of Pain portrays the lives of displaced people. In the novel Baba Yaga Laid An Egg, published in the Canongate Myth Series. Ugrešić drew on the Slavic mythological figure of Baba Yaga to tell a modern fairy tale. It concerns societal gender inequalities and discrimination.

=== Essays ===
Ugrešić’s “creative work resists reduction to simplified, isolated interpretative models”.

Her collection Have A Nice Day: From the Balkan War to the American Dream (Croatian: Američki fikcionar) consists of short dictionary-like essays on American everyday existence, seen through the lenses of a visitor whose country is falling apart. The Culture of Lies is a volume of essays on ordinary lives in a time of war, nationalism and collective paranoia. "Her writing attacks the savage stupidities of war, punctures the macho heroism that surrounds it, and plumbs the depths of the pain and pathos of exile" according to Richard Byrne of Common Review. Thank You For Not Reading is a collection of essays on literary trivia: the publishing industry, literature, culture and the place of writing.

Ugrešić received several major awards for her essays, including Charles Veillon Prize, Heinrich Mann Prize, Jean Amery Prize. In the United States, Karaoke Culture was shortlisted for National Book Critic Circle Award.

=== Other writings ===
Dubravka Ugrešić was also a literary scholar who published articles on Russian avant-garde literature, and a scholarly book on Russian contemporary fiction Nova ruska proza (New Russian Fiction, 1980). She edited anthologies, such as Pljuska u ruci (A Slap in the Hand), co-edited nine volumes of Pojmovnik ruske avangarde (Glossary of Russian avant-garde), and translated writers such as Boris Pilnyak and Daniil Kharms (from Russian into Croatian). She was also the author of three books for children.

== Politics and exile ==
At the outbreak of the war in 1991 in former Yugoslavia, Ugrešić took a firm anti-war and anti-nationalist stand. She wrote critically about nationalism, the stupidity and the criminality of war, and soon became a target of parts of the Croatian media, fellow writers and public figures. She had been accused of anti-patriotism and proclaimed a "traitor", a "public enemy" and a "witch". She left Croatia in 1993 after a long-lasting series of public attacks, and because she “could not adapt to the permanent terror of lies in public, political, cultural, and everyday life”. She wrote about her experience of collective nationalist hysteria in her book The Culture of Lies, and described her "personal case" in the essay The Question of Perspective (Karaoke Culture). She continued to write about the dark sides of modern societies, about the "homogenization" of people induced by media, politics, religion, common beliefs and the marketplace (Europe in Sepia). Being "the citizen of a ruin" she was interested in the complexity of a "condition called exile" (J. Brodsky). Her novels (Ministry of Pain, The Museum of Unconditional Surrender) explore exile traumas, but also the excitement of exile freedom. Her essay Writer in Exile (in Thank You for Not Reading) is a small writer's guide to exile. She described herself as "post-Yugoslav, transnational, or, even more precisely, postnational".

In 2017, she signed the Declaration on the Common Language of the Croats, Serbs, Bosniaks and Montenegrins.

== Literary awards ==
- 1988 – NIN Award (Annual prize for Best New Yugoslav Novel) (Yugoslavia)
- 1996 – Prix européen de l'essai Charles Veillon (Annual prize for Best European Book of Essays) (Switzerland)
- 1997 – Verzetsprijs 1997, Stichting Kunstenaarsverzet 1942–1945 (Artists in Resistance Prize) (Netherlands)
- 1998 – SWF-Bestenliste Literaturpreis (Sud-West-Funk Bestlist Literary Award) (Germany)
- 1998 – Austrian State Prize for European Literature (Austria)
- 2000 – Heinrich Mann Prize. Akademie Der Kunste Berlin (Germany)
- 2004 – Premio Feronia-Città di Fiano (Italy)
- 2006 – Shortlisted for the Independent Foreign Fiction Prize (UK)
- 2009 – Nominated for the Man Booker International Prize (UK)
- 2010 – James Tiptree Jr. Award for Baba Yaga Laid an Egg (US)
- 2011 – Finalist of the National Book Critics Circle Awards (in the Criticism category, for Karaoke Culture: Essays) (USA)
- 2012 – Jean-Améry-Prize for European Essays (Austria/Germany)
- 2016 – Neustadt International Prize for Literature (US)
- 2016 – Vilenica International Literary Festival Prize (Slovenia)
- 2021 – Royal Society of Literature International Writer

== Selected bibliography in English translation ==
- Poza za prozu (1978). A Pose for Prose
- Štefica Cvek u raljama života (1981). Steffie Speck in the Jaws of Life
- Život je bajka (1983). Life Is a Fairy Tale
- Forsiranje romana reke (1988). Fording the Stream of Consciousness, trans. Michael Henry Heim (Virago, 1991; Northwestern University Press, 1993)
- Američki fikcionar (1993). American Fictionary, trans. Celia Hawkesworth and Ellen Elias-Bursác (Open Letter, 2018); revised translation of Have a Nice Day: From the Balkan War to the American Dream. Trans. Celia Hawkesworth (Jonathan Cape, 1994; Viking, 1995)
- Kultura laži (1996). The Culture of Lies, trans. Celia Hawkesworth (Weidenfeld and Nicolson, 1998; Penn State University Press, 1998)
- Muzej bezuvjetne predaje (1997). The Museum of Unconditional Surrender, trans. Celia Hawkesworth (Phoenix House, 1998; New Directions, 2002)
- Zabranjeno čitanje (2002). Thank You for Not Reading, trans. Celia Hawkesworth and Damion Searls (Dalkey Archive, 2003)
- Ministarstvo boli (2004). The Ministry of Pain, trans. Michael Henry Heim (SAQI, 2005; Ecco Press, 2006)
- Nikog nema doma (2005). Nobody’s Home, trans. Ellen Elias-Bursác (Telegram/SAQI, 2007; Open Letter, 2008)
- Baba Jaga je snijela jaje (2007). Baba Yaga Laid an Egg, trans. Ellen Elias-Bursác, Celia Hawkesworth and Mark Thompson (Canongate, 2009; Grove Press, 2010)
- Karaoke kultura (2011). Karaoke Culture, trans. David Williams (Open Letter, 2011)
- Europa u sepiji (2013). Europe in Sepia, trans. David Williams (Open Letter, 2014)
- Lisica (2017). Fox, trans. Ellen Elias-Bursać and David Williams (Open Letter, 2018)
- Doba kože (2019). The Age of Skin, trans. Ellen Elias-Bursać (Open Letter, 2020)
- Brnjica za vještice (2021). A Muzzle for Witches, trans. Ellen Elias-Bursać (Open Letter, 2024)

=== Compilations in English ===
- In the Jaws of Life, trans. Celia Hawkesworth and Michael Henry Heim (Virago, 1992). Collects the novella Steffie Speck in the Jaws of Life, the short story collection Life Is a Fairy Tale (1983), as well as "A Love Story" (from the 1978 short story collection Poza za prozu) and "The Kharms Case" (1987).
  - Republished as In the Jaws of Life and Other Stories (Northwestern University Press, 1993)
  - Republished again as Lend Me Your Character (Dalkey Archive, 2005), translation revised by Damion Searls with "A Love Story" excluded.
  - 2005 edition republished by Open Letter Books in 2023 with additional pieces "How to Ruin Your Own Heroine" and "Button, Button Who's Got the Button?", translated by Ellen Elias-Bursác.
