= Maga Magazinović =

Serbian ballerina, librarian, and journalist

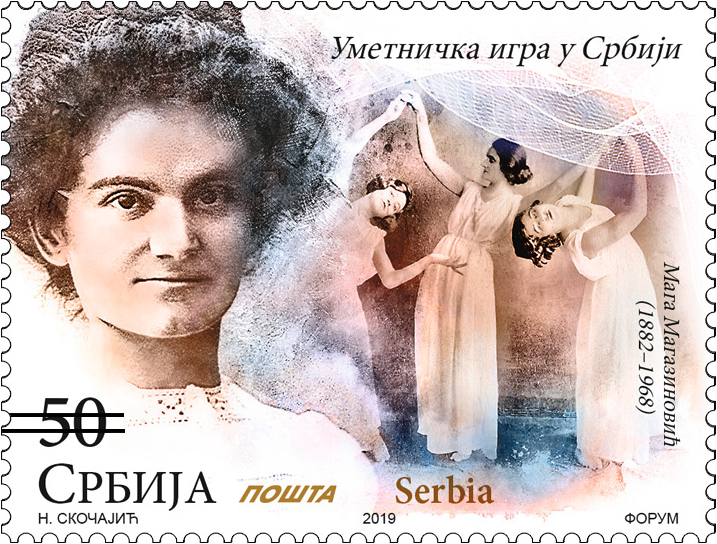
- Magazinović on a 2019 Serbian stamp
- Born: 1882; Užice, Serbia
- Died: 1968 (aged 86); Belgrade, Serbia
- Occupation(s): librarian, ballet dancer, writer

Maga Magazinović (1882–1968) was a librarian and journalist, the first woman who brought modern dance to Serbia and fundamental struggle for gender equality.

== Biography ==
She was born in Užice in 1882. She was the first woman journalist in Politika newspaper where she wrote articles on rhythm and forms of physical and spiritual education of youth, especially young women. She was also the first woman to graduate from the Faculty of Philosophy in Belgrade in 1904. For forty years Maga was professor of philosophy, German and Serbian language in the first female gymnasium. Maga Magazinović was also the first woman librarian in the National Library of Serbia and the first woman who worked as a journalist.

Her family hailed from many different Serbian lands. Her mother Stana, born Isailović, was from Derventa, Bosnia, while on her father's side, their original name was Smiljanić (before it morphed into Magazinović), and they were from Metković. From there, they moved to Trebinje, then to Mostar, then Užice, where Magda was born. Her final permanent residence was Belgrade.

Magazinoc is one of the principal subjects of the essay collection No Man's Lands: eight extraordinary women in Balkan history, by the British-Kosovan writers Elizabeth Gowing and Robert Wilton.
