= Stanka Gjurić =

Croatian poet, essayist and model (born 1966)

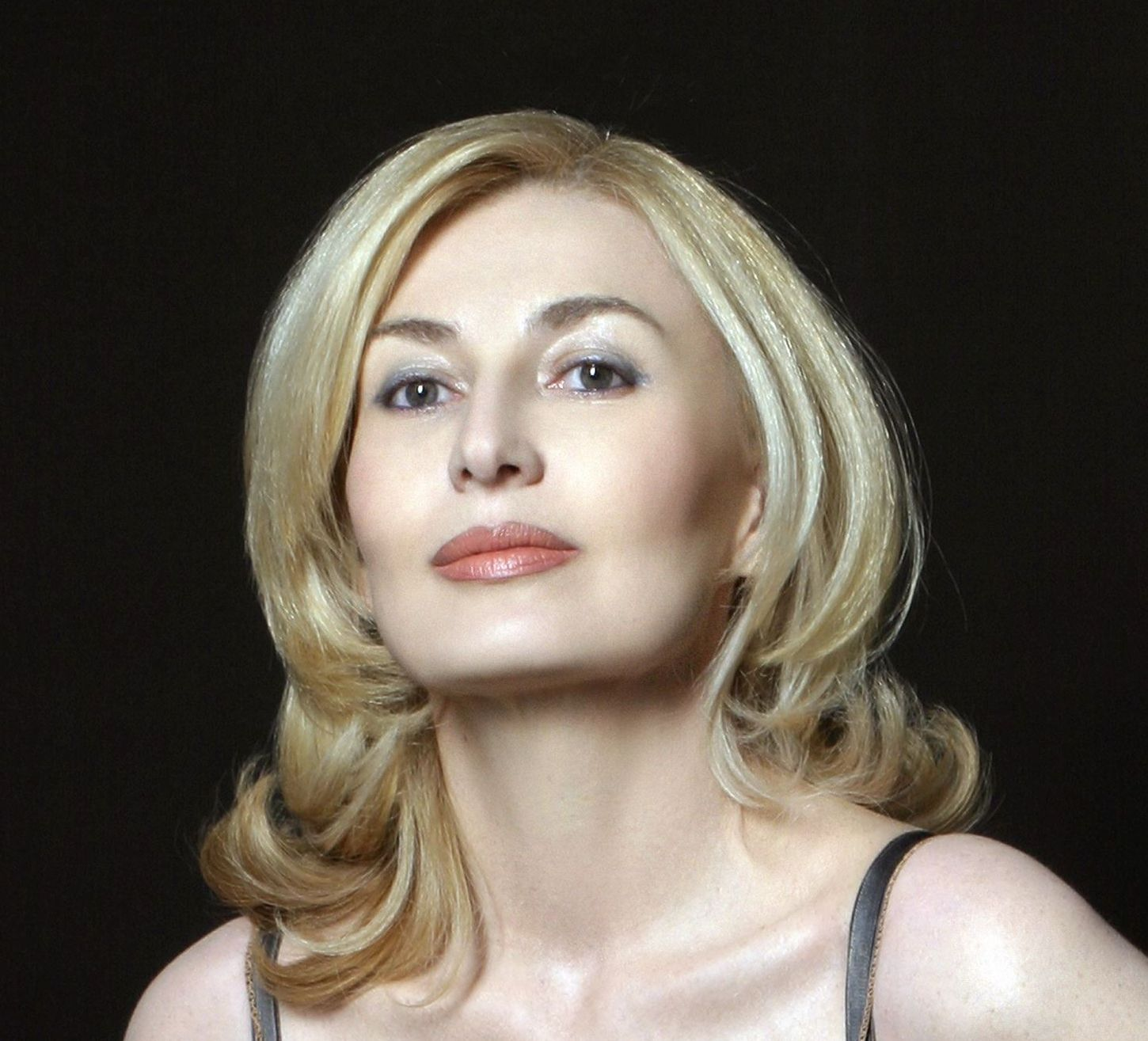
- Gjurić in 2010
- Born: 20 January 1966 (age 60); Čakovec, FNR Yugoslavia
- Occupations: Poet, essayist and filmmaker

Stanka Gjurić (pronounced [Stanka d͡ʑurit͡ɕ]; born 20 January 1966) is a Croatian poet, essayist, actress, filmmaker and ex model. She is a member of the Croatian Writers' Association, Croatian Academy of Science and Art in Diaspora (Basel, Switzerland) and HDS ZAMP. She has also acted in seven feature films.

== Biography ==
Stanka Gjurić was born in Čakovec, FNR Yugoslavia (modern-day Croatia). Today she lives in Zagreb. She has published 20 books (mainly poems, philosophical and lyrical essays). Since 2006 has also worked as a film maker, gaining worldwide acclaim with her short film Ubojite misli (Battle Thoughts). Her short films have been screened in film festivals in France, Italy, Greece, Spain, Portugal, Slovenia, Bosnia and Herzegovina, Canada, India, Egypt, Switzerland, Bangladesh, Brazil, Austria, etc, and she has won 26 awards. In 2019, on the famous IMDb, Gjurić is on the list of 'Croatian Beautiful, Famous & Sexy Actresses', alongside the sixteen most beautiful Croatian actresses.

In November 2024, 2025 and 2026 Stanka chairs the international jury at the Egyptian American Film Festival in New York (NYC).

On January 26, 2026, upon invitation, Gjurić officially became a member of the 'Global Awards Los Angeles', headed by Maximilian Law - a prominent film producer, director and screenwriter, founder and also director of the 'Ferrara Film Festival' in Italy, and artistic director of the 'Comedy Film Fest'.

== Family ==
Stanka's mother Stanka, aka Lela (born Kopjar, 1934–2018, Čakovec), worked as a typist at the Municipal Court in Čakovec, while her father, Dragan Gjurić (1929-1992, Čakovec), was the director of accounting at the G.K. "Međimurje". Stanka is a unit, but his father has two older half-brothers, Tomislav (born in 1949) and Roman (born in 1952). By the way, Stanka's distant cousin is Alojzije Mišić, the bishop of Mostar-Duvno, and the apostolic administrator of Trebinje-Mrkan from 1912 until his death in 1942. Alojzije (Stjepan) Mišić's parents were Mate and Marija (née Cigić) Mišić. Alojzije had two sisters, Marija and Persa. Marija married Ivan Gjurić (Stanka's great-grandfather, i.e. the father of her grandfather Andrija), who with Marija, in addition to Andrija, had three other children (Antun, Ljudevit and Viktorija). Alojzije Mišić's sister, Persa, was a nun.

== Poetry ==
- Sedmi pečat, 1981
- Treći čin, 1983
- Dječak, 1986
- Ključarev san, 1990
- Il sogno del guardiano, 1994
- Protuotrov ili njegovanje ludila, 1994
- Protuotrov ili njegovanje ludila, 1998
- Sve što sja, 2005
- Kažnjavalac dobrih navika, 2005
- Bešćutnost akvarela, 2008
- Protuotrov ili njegovanje ludila/Contravveleno o coltivazione della follia, 2017
- Nepremostiva, 2020

== Essays ==
- Lekcija o drskosti, 2000
- Umijeće življenja, 2015
- Kroz Eros i Thanatos, 2017
- Unveiling reality, 2018
- Istina o sreći, 2018
- Budnost, 2022

== Opinion piece ==
- Otpovijed, 2014
- Otpovijed (II dio), 2015

== Diary prose ==
- Dnevnik vodonoše/The Diary of an Aquarian, 2010

== Filmography ==
=== Acting roles ===
- That Summer of White Roses, as White Rose(1989)
- Vjetar u mreži, as A Woman in a Dream (1989)
- Školjka šumi, as Barmaid (1991)
- Vrijeme za, as Daughter in Law (1992)
- Tu, as Nurse (2003)
- Kad zvoni?, as Nurse (2005)
- S druge strane, as The old man's daughter (2016)
- Koja je ovo država! as Faruk's wife Enisa (2018)
- Link as Stanka Gjurić (2021)

=== Directing ===
- Battle Thoughts (Ubojite misli, 2006) - short
- Sleeping and dreaming (Spavanje i sanjanje, 2006) - short
- Encounter (Susret, 2006) - short
- Passion for book has not disappeared (Strast za knjigom nije nestala, 2007) - short
- Eleven (Jedanaest, 2007) - short
- Happy boat (Sretan brod, 2007) - short
- Courtyard window (Dvorišni prozor, 2007) - short
- Luka's prophecy (Lukino proročanstvo, 2007) - short
- Alexandrian poets (Aleksandrijski pjesnici, 2008) - short
- The sound of life (Zvuci života, 2008) - short
- Bast (2009) - short
- Noon Shot (Zagrebačko podne, 2009) - short
- Lullaby (Uspavanka,2010) - short
- Immoral Manual (Nemoralna čitanka, 2013) - short
- Lust and the heart (O požudi i srcu, 2013) - short
- Lioncity (Lavograd, 2015) - short
- Perfect Tattoo (2016) - short
- Rhythm (Ritam, 2019) - short
- Once upon a time (Jednom davno, 2020) - short
- Summer morning(Ljetno jutro,2021) - short
- Bread (Kruh, 2022) - short
- Link (2022) - short
- Son of a Prophetess (Vračarin sin, 2022) - short
- Six tears (Šest plakanja, 2023) - short
- Without Breathing (Nedišući, 2024) - short
- Political correcntness killed me (Ubi me politička korektnost, 2024) - short
- From New York, with love (Iz New Yorka, s ljubavlju, 2024)
- Twist (Zakoret, 2024)
- Masked cloud (Maskirani oblak, 2025)

== Sources ==
- Croatian Writers' Association
- Stanka Gjurić at IMDb
- Hrvatski audio vizualni centar
- The Official Site
