= Slobodan F. Ribnikar =

Yugoslav journalist (1873–1924)

Slobodan F. Ribnikar Слободан Ф. Рибникар
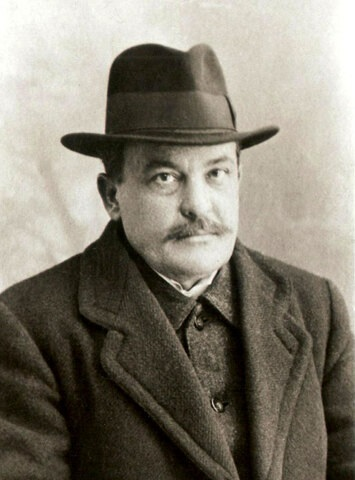
- Born: 20 November 1873; Trstenik, Kingdom of Serbia
- Died: 24 September 1924 (aged 50); Belgrade, Kingdom of Yugoslavia
- Occupations: journalist, physician
- Spouse: Danica Živković
- Children: 3, including Vladislav
- Parent(s): Franc Ribnikar; Milica Srnić
- Relatives: Vladislav F. Ribnikar (brother); Darko F. Ribnikar (brother)

Slobodan F. Ribnikar (Serbian Cyrillic: Слободан Франц Рибникар; 20 November 1873- 24 September 1924) was a Serbian and Yugoslav journalist and physician, CEO of the Politika.

== Biography ==
He was born in Trstenik, Serbia in 1873, the one of three sons of a Slovene physician, Franc Ribnikar from Carniola and his Serbian wife Milica Srnić from Kostajnica.

Slobodan Ribnikar continued the medical tradition of his father Franc. After finishing school in Jagodina and Belgrade, he enrolled at the Faculty of Medicine in Vienna and became a physician in 1896. He served in Skoplje, Ćuprija and Umka, and after that he came to Belgrade, where he became a doctor of the Belgrade municipality.

His first marriage was with Danica Živković, daughter of the Belgrade merchant Milan Živković, with whom he had sons Vladislav and Miroslav and daughter Stanislava. He was in his second marriage with actress Slava, the daughter of veterinarian Kratohvil. As a doctor, Slobodan participated in the wars of 1912–1918, as a medical officer. He was the manager of war hospitals, and he came out of the war as a medical lieutenant colonel.

Slobodan Ribnikar was the CEO of Politika for a relatively short time - only five years. He died on September 24, 1924, and his eldest son Vladislav became the CEO of Politika.

Preceded by Miomir Milenković	Editor-in-chief of Politika; 1914–1924	Succeeded by Vladislav S. Ribnikar
