= Radosav Ljumović =

Montenegrin journalist and poet

Radosav Ljumović Радосав Љумовић
- Born: 24 August 1902; Piperi, Kingdom of Montenegro
- Died: 4 April 1938 (aged 35); Aragon front, Spanish Civil War
- Occupations: journalist; poet; revolutionary
- Writing career
- Notable work: Sutonski odblesci: pesme (1925)

Radosav Ljumović (Serbo-Croatian Cyrillic: Радосав Љумовић; 24 August 1902 – 4 April 1938) was a Montenegrin journalist, revolutionary and poet. He is one of the founders of social poetry in Montenegro.

== Biography ==
He was born in the village of Crnci, in Piperi, near Podgorica, in 1902. He attended primary school in Piperska Ćelija, and high school in Podgorica and Peć, where he graduated in 1923. He studied law in Belgrade, graduating in 1927. He served his military service in a student company and was awarded the rank of reserve second lieutenant (1924). In Novi Sad, in 1925, he completed a radiotelegraphy course and was employed as a postal clerk in Belgrade.

He became a member of the Communist Party of Yugoslavia in 1925. Due to his communist activities, he was sentenced to one year in prison in 1929 by the Court for the Protection of the State. He served his sentence in the prison in Sremska Mitrovica in 1929‒1930. He spent eight months in 1932 in the Penitentiary and in Jusovača in Podgorica, from where he was released before the trial due to lack of evidence.

He went to Spain in September 1937 and fought in the "Đuro Đaković" battalion. He was killed on the Aragon Front near Morella on 4 April 1938. The People's Library in Podgorica was named after him in 1959.

== Works ==
He worked as a journalist in Belgrade newspapers, including "Pravda" and "Politika", writing reports and stories about everyday problems of ordinary people. Also, he published in "Venac" (Belgrade), "Đačka družina" (Kruševac), "Književni sever" (Subotica), "Srž" (Podgorica), "Zapisi" (Cetinje). Some articles, mostly of a satirical nature, published in "Ošišani jež" were signed by the pseudonyms Jež Karadžić and Jež Vrčević. He also wrote literary criticism. His polemical articles were published in "Zeta" and "Slobodna Misao". He spoke French, translated from Russian and Bulgarian. In 1925 in Podgorica he published a collection of poems "Sutonski odblesci: pesme".
