= Senično =

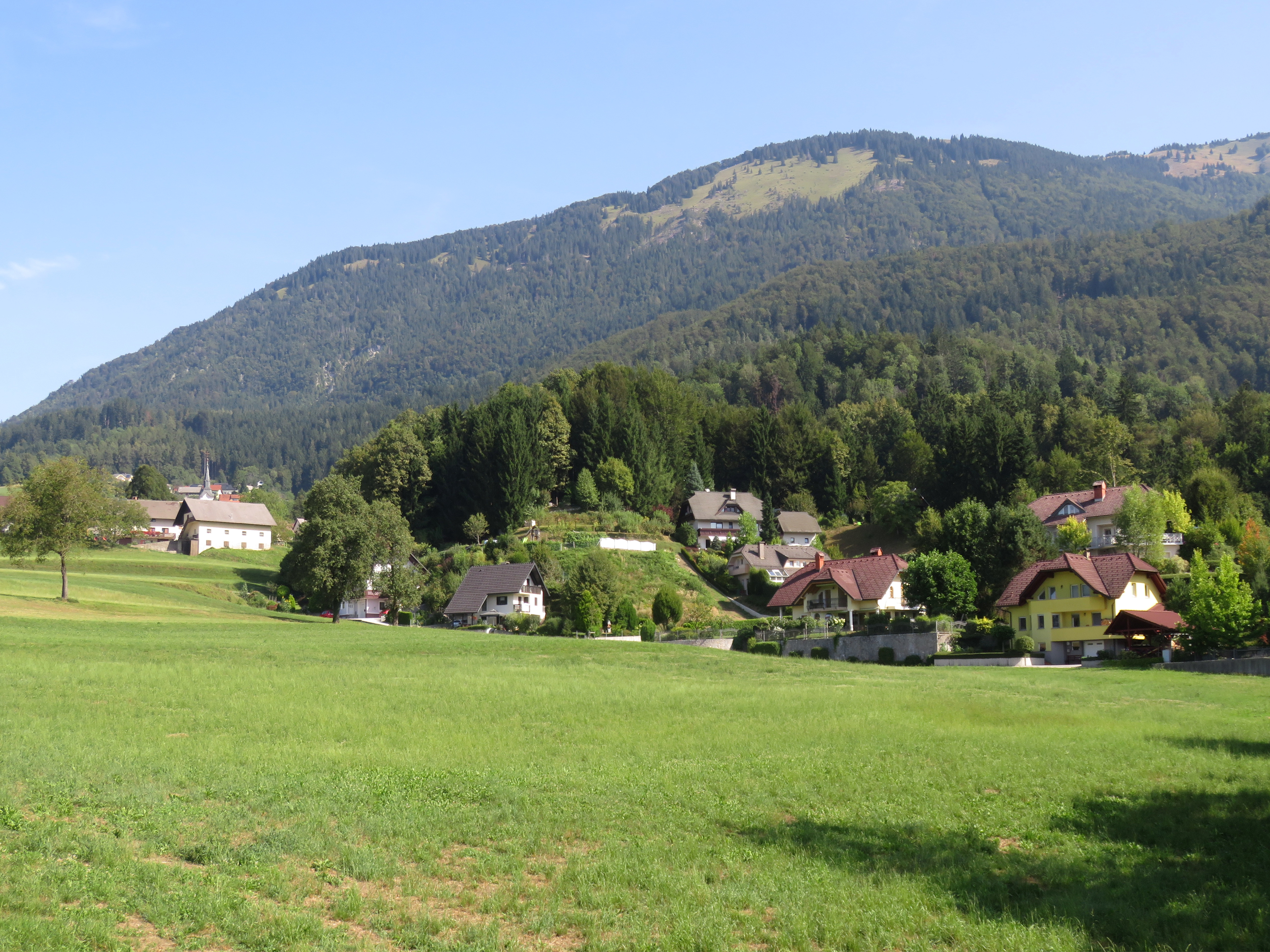

- Location in Slovenia
- Coordinates: 46°19′52.14″N 14°19′3.8″E
- Country: Slovenia
- Traditional region: Upper Carniola
- Statistical region: Upper Carniola
- Municipality: Tržič
- Elevation: 513.7 m (1,685 ft)

Population (2002)
  - Total: 288

Senično (pronounced [sɛˈniːtʃnɔ]; in older sources also Stenično, German: Stenitschno) is a village in the Municipality of Tržič in the Upper Carniola region of Slovenia.

== Church ==
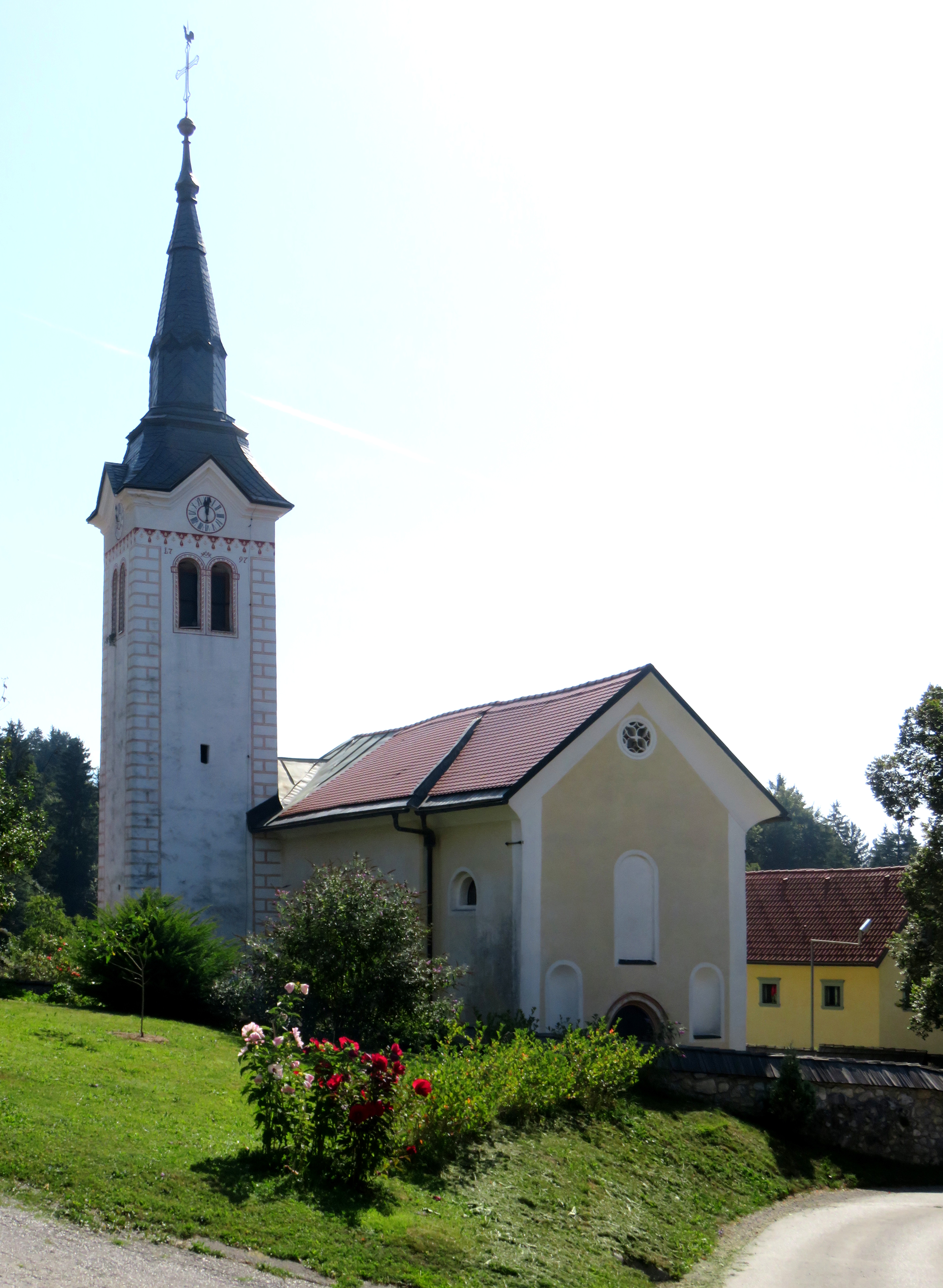
Saint Bartholomew's Church

The local church is dedicated to Saint Bartholomew and dates from the 14th century with well-preserved late 15th-century frescos on the walls and ceiling of the sanctuary. The church lies inside a walled enclosure with a portal dated 1738.
