= Rajko Grlić =

Croatian film director

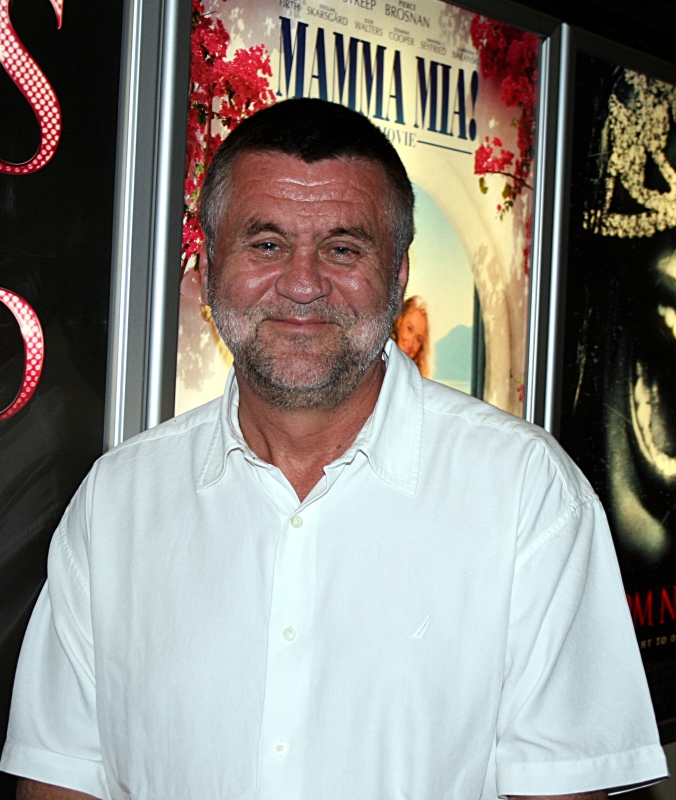
- Grlić at the Nije kraj premiere in May 2008.
- Born: 2 September 1947 (age 78); Zagreb, PR Croatia, FPR Yugoslavia
- Years active: 1974 – present
- Parents: Danko Grlić; Eva Izrael
- Awards: Cannes Palme d'Or; Nominated 1978 Bravo Maestro; Golden Arena for Best Director; 1984 In the Jaws of Life; Tokyo Grand Prix; 1989 That Summer of White Roses; San Sebastián Golden Shell; Nominated 2006 Karaula

Rajko Grlić (born 2 September 1947) is a Croatian film director, producer and screenwriter. He is a professor of film theory at Ohio University and artistic director of the Motovun Film Festival in Motovun, Croatia.

== Biography ==
Rajko Grlić was born in 1947 in Zagreb, SR Croatia, FPR Yugoslavia. His father was Danko Grlić, famous Croatian philosopher. Grlić's (Gerlich) family by father's side came to Zagreb from Schwarzwald, Germany in the 19th century, while his mother Eva (née Izrael) is from Jewish family of Sarajevo.

He graduated from the Film Faculty of the Academy of Performing Arts in Prague (FAMU) at the same time as Emir Kusturica, a Bosnian film director. During the Croatian war of independence Grlić moved to the USA.

In 2017, Grlić signed the Declaration on the Common Language of the Croats, Serbs, Bosniaks and Montenegrins.

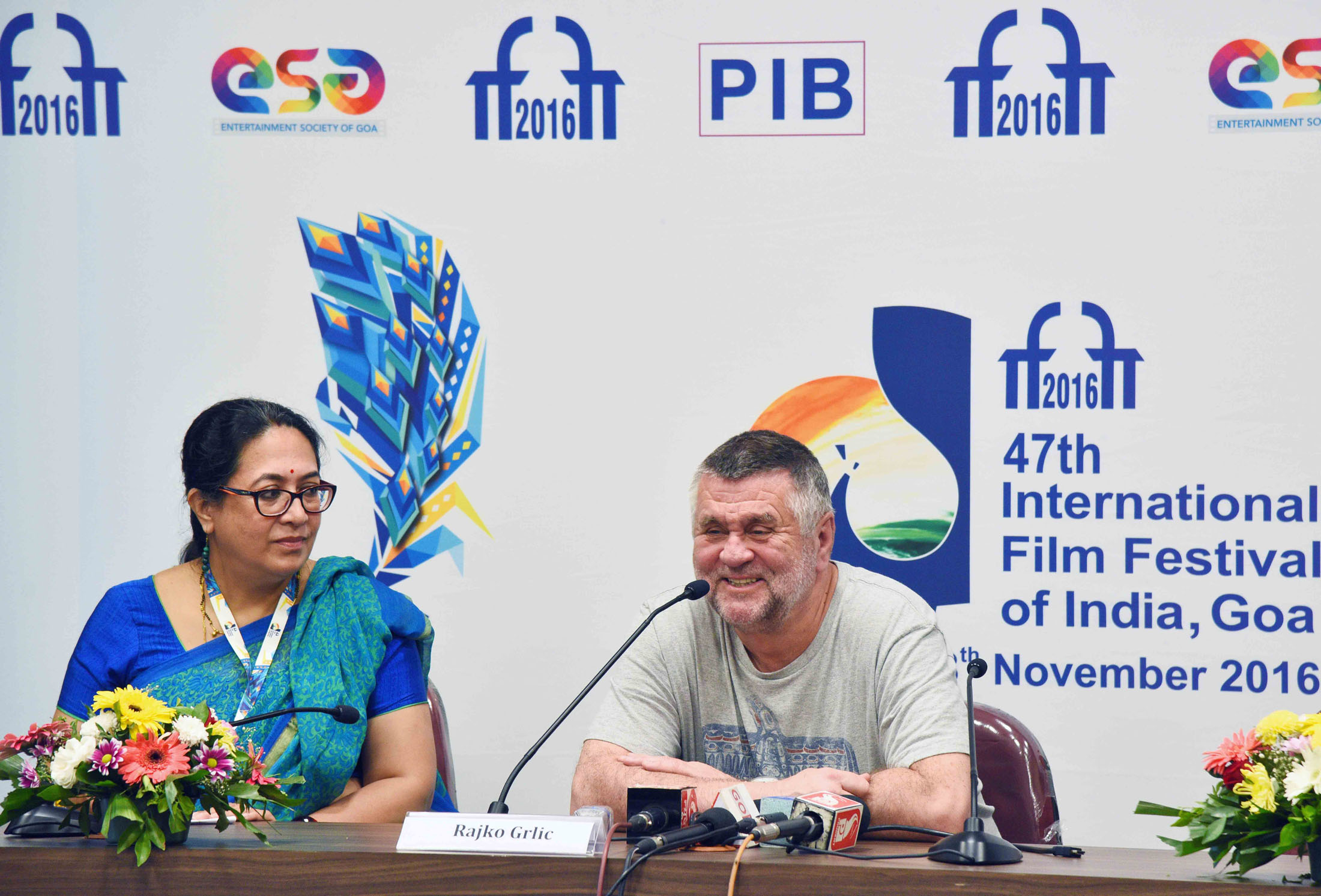
Rajko Grlić (right), IFFI (2016)

== Filmography ==
=== As director ===
- Whichever Way the Ball Bounces (Kud puklo da puklo, 1974)
- Bravo Maestro (Bravo maestro, 1978)
- The Melody Haunts My Memory (Samo jednom se ljubi, 1981)
- In the Jaws of Life (U raljama života, 1984)
- Three for Happiness (Za sreću je potrebno troje, 1985)
- That Summer of White Roses (Đavolji raj, 1989)
- Charuga (Čaruga, 1991)
- Josephine (2002)
- The Border Post (Karaula, 2006)
- Just Between Us (Neka ostane među nama, 2010)
- The Constitution (Ustav Republike Hrvatske, 2016)

=== As producer ===
- Whichever Way the Ball Bounces (Kud puklo da puklo, 1974)
- In the Jaws of Life (U raljama života, 1984)
- Three for Happiness (Za sreću je potrebno troje, 1985)
- That Summer of White Roses (Đavolji raj, 1989)
- Čaruga (1991)
- Who Wants to be a President (2001)
- Happy Kid (Sretno dijete) (2004)

== See also ==
- Praška filmska škola

Awards and achievements
Pula Film Festival
| Preceded by Srđan Karanović for Something In-Between | Golden Arena for Best Director; Rajko Grlić; 1984 for In the Jaws of Life | Succeeded by Emir Kusturica for When Father Was Away on Business |
| Preceded by Goran Dević & Zvonimir Jurić for The Blacks | Golden Arena for Best Director; Rajko Grlić; 2010 for Just Between Us | Succeeded by Dalibor Matanić for Daddy |
Tokyo International Film Festival
| Preceded by Wu Tianming for Old Well | Grand Prix; Rajko Grlić; 1989 for That Summer of White Roses | Succeeded by John Sayles for City of Hope |
