= Pinkus Kartin =

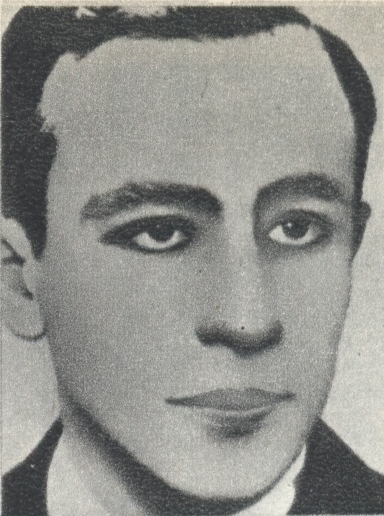
Pinkus Kartin.

Pinkus Kartin (pseudonym: Andrzej Szmidt; 1914 – 20 May 1942) was a Polish-Jewish communist activist and anti-Nazi resistance fighter.

== Biography ==
Kartin was born in Lutsk. He joined the Young Communist League of Poland at a young age and later the Communist Party of Poland (KPP). Around 1936–1937 he went to Paris to study at the Sorbonne.

In January 1938, Kartin went to fight in the Spanish Civil War in the ranks of the XIII International Brigade. After being wounded, he returned to Paris in April 1939, where he edited Dziennik Ludowy, a Polish-language communist newspaper banned by the French authorities.

Kartin was recognized as a Soviet citizen when his birth town of Lutsk was incorporated into the Soviet Union in 1940. In 1941 he went to the Soviet Union and received military training. At the end of 1941 Kartin was parachuted into the Warsaw area, tasked with building an underground communist party and an armed resistance force in order to fight the German occupants.

Kartin was charged with organizing the underground communist party and combat units inside the Warsaw Ghetto. In February 1942 Kartin and Józef Lewartowski met with Mordechai Anielewicz and other leaders of the Jewish Combat Organization. As a result, the Anti-Fascist Bloc was formed in March 1942. Kartin was also a founding member of the Polish Workers' Party in 1942 and trained partisans for Gwardia Ludowa.

In May 1942, Kartin was arrested by the Gestapo and taken to Pawiak Prison in Warsaw, where he was interrogated and then murdered. It later emerged that a Gestapo agent who had infiltrated the Polish communists was responsible for his arrest.

Posthumously, Kartin was awarded the Order of the Cross of Grunwald in 1945.
