= Vladimir Majder =

Croatian Partisan (1911-1943)

- Born: 1911; Sisak, Austro-Hungarian Empire, (now Croatia)
- Died: 1943 (aged 32); Otočac, Independent State of Croatia, (now Croatia)
- Education: University of Zagreb

Vladimir Majder (1911–1943) was a Croatian Partisan who fought in the Spanish Civil War and World War II.

Majder was born in Sisak to a Jewish family. After finishing elementary and high school in Sisak, he moved to Zagreb, where he studied at the School of Medicine, University of Zagreb. As a high school student in Sisak, he joined the youth revolutionary movement and became a member of the Young Communist League of Yugoslavia. During his studies he actively participated in the revolutionary movement, and in 1932 he was admitted to the Communist Party of Yugoslavia. Since he often visited Sisak, he served as a link between Zagreb and Sisak party organization. Majder was politically very active and acted in the Sisak area.

In 1936, Spanish Civil War broke out, Majder was among the first Croatian volunteers who joined the International Brigades. During the Spanish civil war, Majder was the first secretary of the 12th Balkan troop, and later an intelligence officer in the International Brigades. After the war, Majder moved to France where he was imprisoned.

During World War II, in August 1942, he managed to escape and move to the occupied Yugoslavia, Croatia. Immediately upon his arrival, Majder joined the Partisans. He was the intelligence officer operating in the Croatian zone, and later a member of the Partisan General Headquarters.

In June 1943, Mayder died of typhus fever in Otočac. In Majders honour, high school "Vladimir Majder Kurt" in Sisak was named after him.

== Bibliography ==
- Goldstein, Ivo (2001). Holokaust u Zagrebu. Zagreb: Novi Liber. ISBN 953-6045-19-2.
- Romano, Jaša (1980). Jevreji Jugoslavije 1941-1945, žrtve genocida i učesnici NOR. Beograd: Savez jevrejskih opština Jugoslavije.
