= Robert Domany =

Croatian partisan (1908–1942)

- Robert Domany during Spanish Civil War
- Born: 16 March 1908; Orahovica, Kingdom of Croatia-Slavonia, Austria-Hungary
- Died: 3 March 1942 (aged 33); Plaški, Independent State of Croatia
- Education: University of Zagreb

Robert Domany (also spelled Domani; 16 February 1908 – 3 March 1942) was a Croatian Partisan and a People's Hero of Yugoslavia.

Domany was born in Orahovica on 16 February 1908 to a Sephardic Jewish family.

He had a younger brother, Rudolf Domany who also fought with Partisans during World War II and who was the husband of Eva Grlić until his death. Before the war, Domany studied at the Technical Faculty at the University of Zagreb. During the study he joined the Young Communist League of Yugoslavia revolutionary movement.

In 1937, Domany became a member of the Communist Party of Yugoslavia. That same year he moved to Spain, to join the International Brigades to fight against Spanish Nationalists. There he was promoted to the rank of artillery captain in the Spanish Republican Army and commander of the battery in the second division of heavy artillery "Škoda".

During World War II, he was imprisoned at the concentration camps in France from which he was deported to Nazi Germany for forced labour in a Junkers factory. Soon after, the Gestapo deported him to Braunschweig at Neuengamme concentration camp. Via already established channels for the return of Spanish volunteers in the country, Domany managed to escape and returned to Zagreb, and immediately was involved in the fight against Nazism. In August 1941, he helped organize the Partisan units in Kordun. Soon after he was appointed as the commander of the second Partisan Kordun detachment. With his detachment he was involved in fights for Slunj, Vojnić, Veljun and Plaški.

At the beginning of 1942, Italian fascists, with help from Chetniks, captured Domany with fellow fighters Drago Štajnberger, Branko Latas, and Stevo Čuturilo. All were killed by the Chetniks and their corpses thrown into the Balinka pit.

On 24 July 1953, Domany was declared a People's Hero of Yugoslavia by Josip Broz Tito.

The four men's bodies were found in 1966 by a British caving team after which they were buried in a common grave in Plaški.

== Bibliography ==
- Goldstein, Ivo (2001). Holokaust u Zagrebu. Zagreb: Novi Liber. ISBN 953-6045-19-2.
- Knežević, Snješka; Laslo, Aleksander (2011). Židovski Zagreb. Zagreb: AGM, Židovska općina Zagreb. ISBN 978-953-174-393-8.
- Goldstein, Ivo (2005). Židovi u Zagrebu 1918 - 1941. Zagreb: Novi Liber. ISBN 953-6045-23-0.
- Romano, Jaša (1980). Jevreji Jugoslavije 1941-1945: žrtve genocida i učesnici narodnooslobodilačkog rata. Beograd: Jevrejski Istorijski Muzej, Saveza jevrejskih opština Jugoslavije.
- Đurđević-Đukić, Olga (1975). Narodni heroji Jugoslavije, A-M, N-Ž. Beograd: Mladost.
