= Drago Štajnberger =

Croatian Partisan (1916–1942)

- Born: 15 February 1916; Zagreb, Austro-Hungarian Empire, (now Croatia)
- Died: 3 March 1942 (aged 26); Plaški, Kingdom of Yugoslavia, (now Croatia)

Drago Štajnberger (born Adolf Steinberger; 15 February 1916 – 3 March 1942) was a Croatian-Jewish Partisan and a People's Hero of Yugoslavia.

Štajnberger was born on 15 February 1916 in Zagreb to a Jewish family of Mavro Štajnberger. In his early youth he joined the Young Communist League of Yugoslavia. In 1937, during the Spanish Civil War he went to Spain as a volunteer, soon to be included in the ranks of the International Brigades. He was known as a brave and resourceful fighter. In 1938, Štajnberger became a member of the Communist Party of Yugoslavia. Afterwards he returned to Zagreb.

During World War II, he was imprisoned at the concentration camps in France from which he was deported for forced labour to Nazi Germany. He managed to escape in mid-July 1941, and move to the occupied territory of Yugoslavia, in Croatia. Upon arrival, Štajnberger briefly stayed in Zagreb, and then moved to the liberated territory in Kordun. He helped organize the first Partisan units in Perjasica, Kestenjac, Veljun, Kloloć and Kladuša. Among the Partisans and the people of Kordun at the time, he was known by his birth name Adolf.

At the beginning of 1942, Italian fascists with the help from the Chetniks captured Štajnberger with fellow fighters Robert Domany, Branko Latas and Stevo Čuturilo. All of them were killed by Chetniks, and afterwards their bodies were thrown in the pit of Balinka.

Štajnberger was declared a People's Hero of Yugoslavia on 27 July 1942 and was among the first recipients of the award.

The four men's bodies were found in 1966 by a British caving team, after which they were buried in a common grave in Plaški.

== Bibliography ==
- Goldstein, Ivo (2005). Židovi u Zagrebu 1918 - 1941. Zagreb: Novi Liber. ISBN 953-6045-23-0.
- Goldstein, Ivo (2001). Holokaust u Zagrebu. Zagreb: Novi Liber. ISBN 953-6045-19-2.
- Romano, Jaša (1980). Jevreji Jugoslavije 1941-1945: žrtve genocida i učesnici narodnooslobodilačkog rata. Beograd: Jevrejski Istorijski Muzej, Saveza jevrejskih opština Jugoslavije.
- Đurđević-Đukić, Olga (1975). Narodni heroji Jugoslavije, A-M, N-Ž. Beograd: Mladost.
