= Darko F. Ribnikar =

Serbian journalist (1878–1914)

Davorin Darko F. Ribnikar Даворин Дарко Ф. Рибникар
- Даворин Дарко Ф. Рибникар
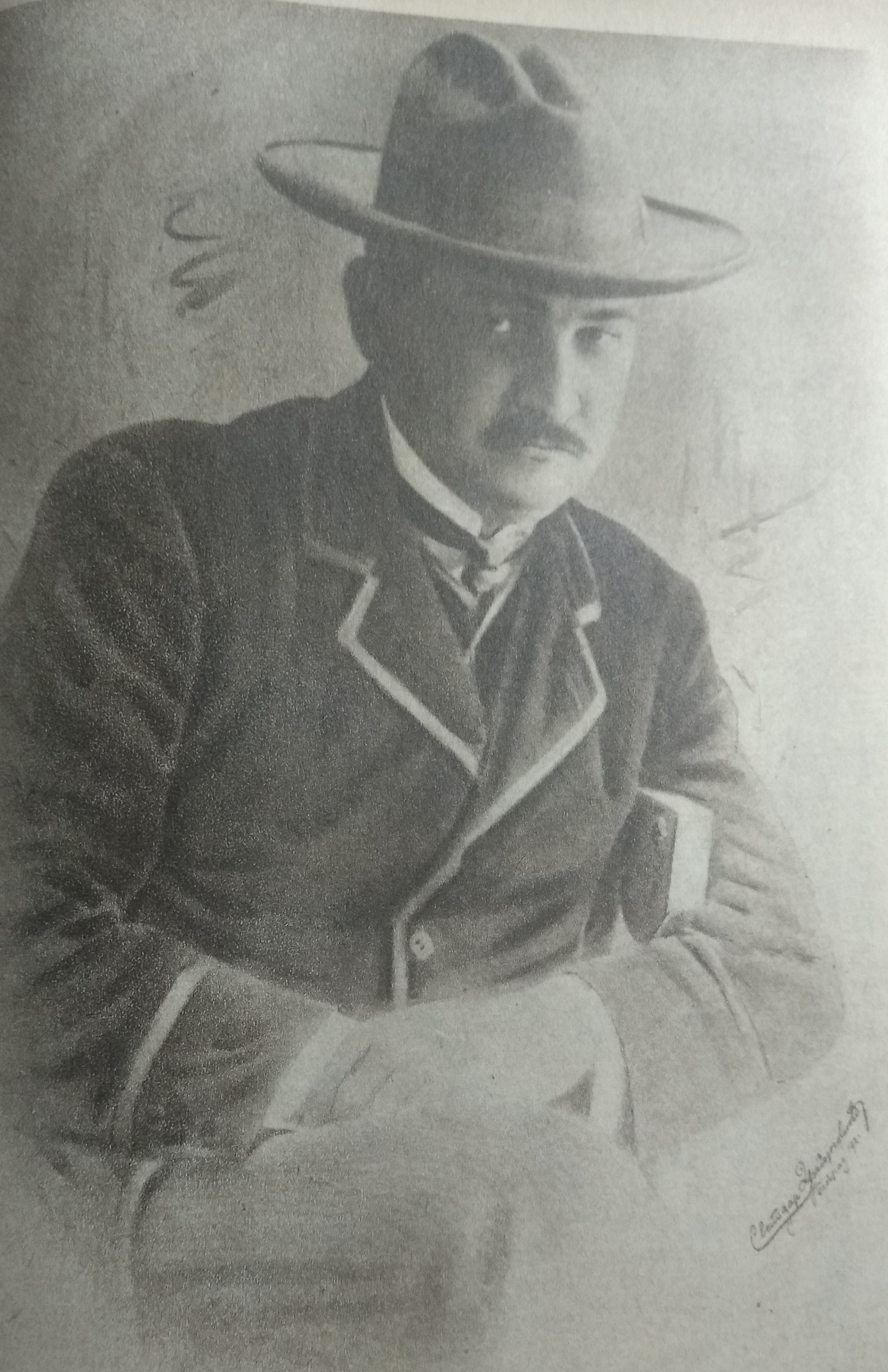
- Born: Davorin Darko F. Ribnikar; 16 May 1878; Svilajnac, Principality of Serbia
- Died: 31 August 1914 (aged 36); Bela Crkva, Kingdom of Serbia
- Resting place: Saint Georgije Serbian Orthodox Church, Bela Crkva
- Occupation: Journalist
- Parent(s): Franc Ribnikar; Milica Srnić
- Relatives: Vladislav F. Ribnikar (brother); Slobodan F. Ribnikar (brother)
- Military career
- Allegiance: Kingdom of Serbia
- Conflicts: Balkan Wars World War I: Battle of Drina †

Davorin Darko F. Ribnikar (Serbian Cyrillic: Даворин Дарко Ф. Рибникар; 16 May 1878 – 31 August 1914) was a foreign policy editor of the Politika. Also, he was the first special correspondent of the Politika on important international events and he was the brother of its founder Vladislav F. Ribnikar.

== Biography ==
Ribnikar was the youngest son of Slovene physician from Carniola, Franc Ribnikar. He had two brothers Vladislav and Slobodan. He was educated in Svilajnac and Belgrade. He graduated in law in Germany, in Berlin and in Jena. After the death of his father, in 1905, he returned to Belgrade to assist his brother Vladislav with Politika.

Ribnikar became editor in chief for the newspaper but also served as special correspondent in Romania during the Peasant revolt of 1907 and during the Friedjung process in Vienna in 1909.

As a reserve officer of the Serbian army Ribnikar participated in both Balkan Wars, like his brother he was twice severely wounded. During the Austro-Hungarian invasion of Serbia on 31 August 1914 Ribnikar was killed in action by an enemy shell. The trench in which he was killed was photo documented by Andra Popović in his War album 1914-1918.
