= Vladislav F. Ribnikar =

Serbian journalist (1871–1914)

Vladislav F. Ribnikar Владислав Ф. Рибникар
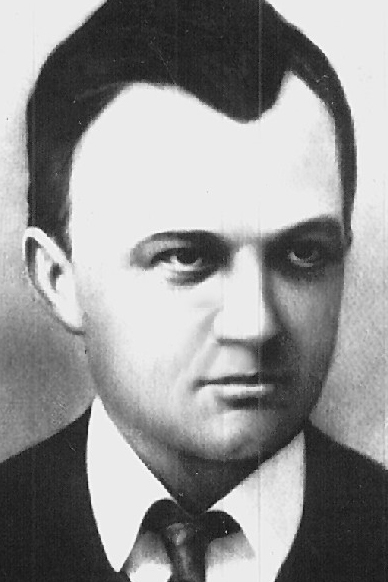
- Born: 13 November 1871; Trstenik, Principality of Serbia
- Died: 1 September 1914 (aged 42); Sokolska planina, Carina, Kingdom of Serbia
- Resting place: Dormition of the Most Holy Mother of God Serbian Orthodox Church, Pecka
- Education: University of Belgrade
- Occupation: Journalist
- Spouse: Milica Čolak-Antić
- Children: Danica Nana; Jovanka Vesa
- Parent(s): Franc Ribnikar; Milica Srnić
- Relatives: Darko F. Ribnikar (brother); Slobodan F. Ribnikar (brother)
- Writing career
- Notable work: Founder of Politika
- Military career
- Allegiance: Kingdom of Serbia
- Conflicts: Balkan Wars; Siege of Adrianople; Battle of Bregalnica; World War I; Battle of Drina †

Vladislav F. Ribnikar (Serbian Cyrillic: Владислав Ф. Рибникар; 13 November 1871 – 1 September 1914) was a Serbian journalist, known for founding Politika, the oldest Serbian daily. He led the newspaper from the day it was founded in 1904 until his death in combat during the World War I. He is the progenitor of contemporary Serbian citizen journalism.

== Biography ==
Vladislav Franc Ribnikar was born in Trstenik, Serbia in 1871, the oldest of three sons of a Slovene doctor, Franc Ribnikar from Carniola and his Serbian wife Milica Srnić from Kostajnica.

Ribnikar went to school in Jagodina and Belgrade. He studied history of philosophy at the University of Belgrade Faculty of Philosophy from 1888 to 1892. After graduation he continued his education in France where he received his master's degree from the Sorbonne in Paris then Berlin to study at the Humboldt University on a state scholarship.

The coup d'état of May 1903 which saw the end of the Obrenović dynasty in Serbia stopped him from finishing his PhD but the arrival of the Karađorđević dynasty to the throne brought democracy and freedom of the press for the first time in Serbia. Vladislav F. Ribnikar influenced by his experience in France and Germany decided to launch the first independent Serbian newspaper.

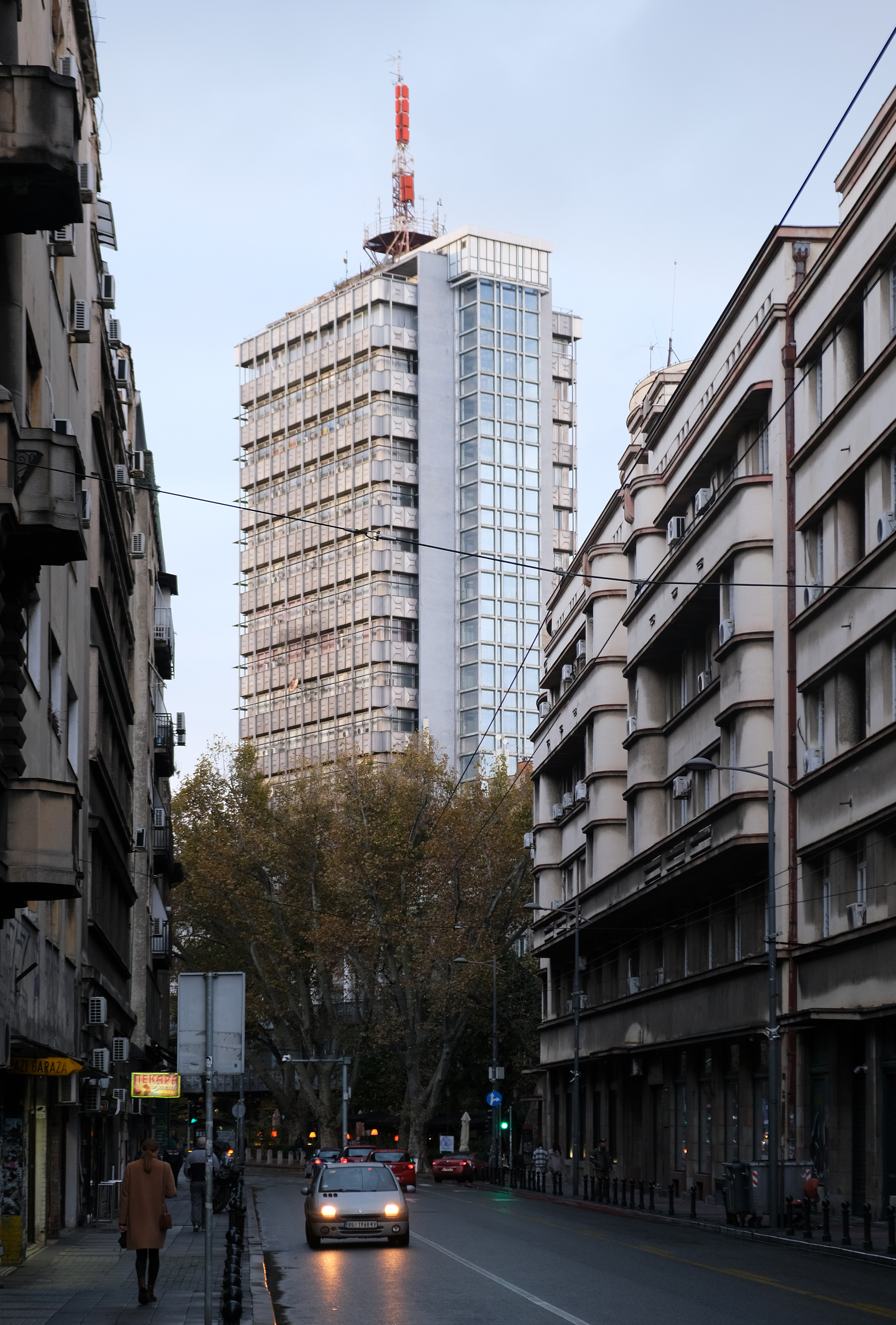
Headquarters of Politika in the Politika Square No. 1 in Belgrade.

Ribnikar's wife, Milica "Milka" Čolak-Antić, a member of the Čolak-Antić family, daughter of Lt Colonel Lazar Čolak-Antić and descendant of renowned Vojvoda from the First Serbian uprising Čolak-Anta Simeonović, also believed in the need for an independent newspaper and invested her personal fortune into the endeavour. The idea to create an independent newspaper, without links to any of the political parties, was a novel idea in Serbia. as no one thought that an independent newspaper could survive without help from a political party, in addition there were already eleven daily party-oriented newspapers at the time. The first issue of Politika came out on 25 January 1904 with 2,450 copies printed, In only a few years it managed to become the most important daily in Serbia.

After studying in his native Svilajnac and Belgrade, following his graduation in Germany at the universities in Jena and Berlin, Ribnikar's younger brother Darko and another brother Slobodan, a physician, also joined Politika.

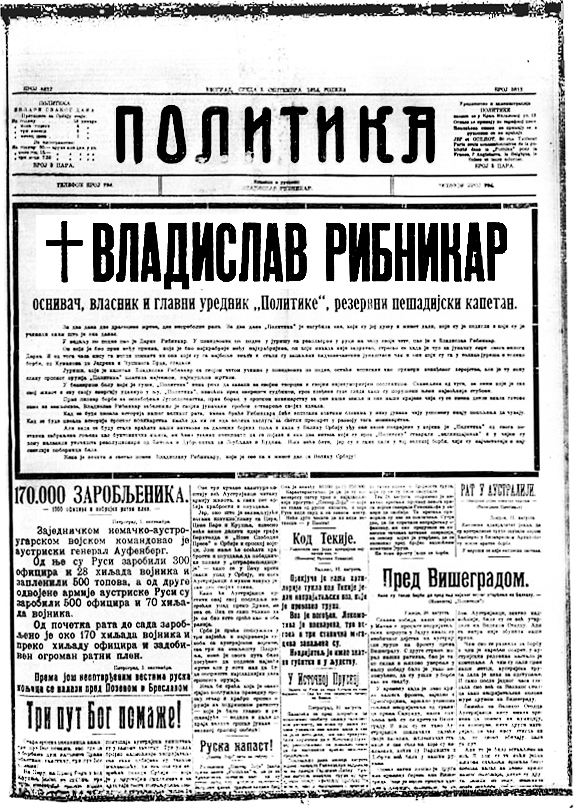
Front page of Politika announcing the death of Vladislav Ribnikar

As a reserve officer of the Royal Serbian Army, Ribnikar participated in the 1912–13 Balkan Wars, he was wounded twice, near Odrin (1912) and near Bregalnica (1913). After the outbreak of the World War I, he was once again called back to active duty. Ribnikar was killed in action on 1 September 1914 in western Serbia, in the Sokolska planina mountain; only a day after his youngest brother Darko, reserve captain and editor-in-chief of Politika, had been killed by an enemy shell on the front line at Ravno Brdo. On 2 September 1914, Politika announced the death of its founder with a large banner headline. After the death of the Ribnikar brothers, Vladislav's wife, Milica Čolak-Antić Ribnikar, became the pillar of Politika selling the family jewellery to revive the newspaper. In order to raise more money, she sold the family estate in Dedinje, Belgrade, to Regent Aleksandar Karadjordjević, the land where the Serbian royal residence, the White Palace, was later built. Ribnikar's daughter Danica, married British spy and career diplomat Sir John S. Bennett in 1943.

== Legacy ==
- On the occasion of the death of the Ribnikar brothers, Isidora Sekulić wrote a poem published in Politika of September 1914.
- In Trstenik, a "Ribnikar Day" (Ribnikarevi dani) is organized in his honour.
- Vladislav Ribnikar has a street named after him in Trstenik.

Preceded by Position created	Editor-in-chief of Politika; 1904–1914	Succeeded by Miomir Milenković
