= Politika =

Serbian daily newspaper

- Type: Daily newspaper
- Format: Berliner
- Owner(s): Politika a.d. (50%); East Media Group (50%)
- Founder: Vladislav F. Ribnikar
- Publisher: Politika novine i magazini d.o.o.
- Editor: Marko Albunović
- Founded: 25 January [O.S. 12 January] 1904
- Language: Serbian
- Headquarters: Politika Square 1, Belgrade
- Country: Serbia
- Circulation: ~45,000 (as of 2016)
- ISSN: 0350-4395
- OCLC number: 231040838
- Website: www.politika.rs

The Politika (Serbian Cyrillic: Политика, lit. 'Politics') is a Serbian daily newspaper, published in Belgrade. Founded in 1904 by Vladislav F. Ribnikar, it is the oldest daily newspaper still in circulation in the Balkans.

== Publishing and ownership ==
Politika is published by Politika novine i magazini (PNM), a joint venture between Politika a.d. and East Media Group. The current director of PNM is Mira Glišić Simić.

PNM also publishes:

- Sportski žurnal
- Politikin Zabavnik
- Svet kompjutera
- Ilustrovana Politika
- Bazar

== History ==
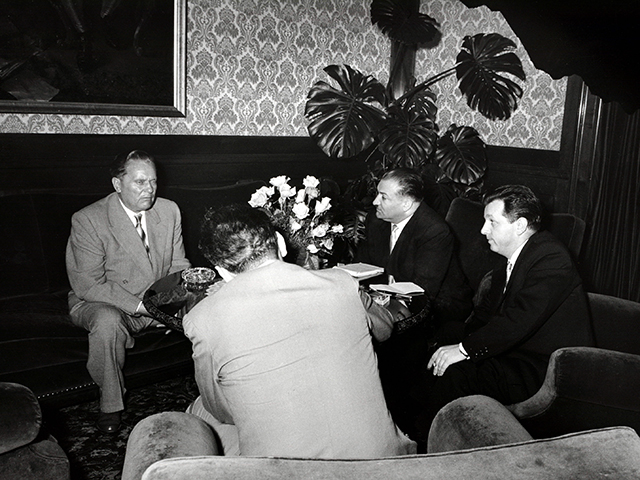
Politika editor meeting President of Yugoslavia Josip Broz Tito in 1957

Since its launch in January 1904, Politika has been published daily except for several periods. Due to World War I, there were no issues from 14 November 1914 to 21 December 1914, and again from 23 September 1915 to 1 December 1919. In the World War II, there were no issues from 6 April 1941 to 28 October 1944. In protest against the government's intentions to turn Politika into a state-owned enterprise, a single issue was not published in summer 1992. The launch issue had only four pages and a circulation of 2,450 copies, and its record high circulation was the 25 December 1973 issue (634,000 copies).

=== Reporting during the Yugoslav Wars ===
In the run-up to and during the breakup of Yugoslavia and the Yugoslav Wars, Politika was under the control of Slobodan Milošević and the League of Communists of Serbia and was used for political purposes. It was used to publish controversial things such as the "Vojko i Savle" article, as well as an information guide to show what was allegedly happening to the Serbs in other republics, together with the Radio Television of Serbia. Politika blamed the local Kosovo Albanians for sodomizing Đorđe Martinović, and published fabricated reader letters claiming that the Albanians were "raping hundreds of Serbian women". Before and during the Croatian War of Independence, it published opinions on how "blood may shed again" in Croatia because of World War II, published claims on how the Vatican funded Croatia to break up Yugoslavia. At the end of the Battle of Vukovar, it ran the fabricated story of the Vukovar children massacre. However, the article was retracted with a statement published the following day.

=== Post-Yugoslav Wars ===
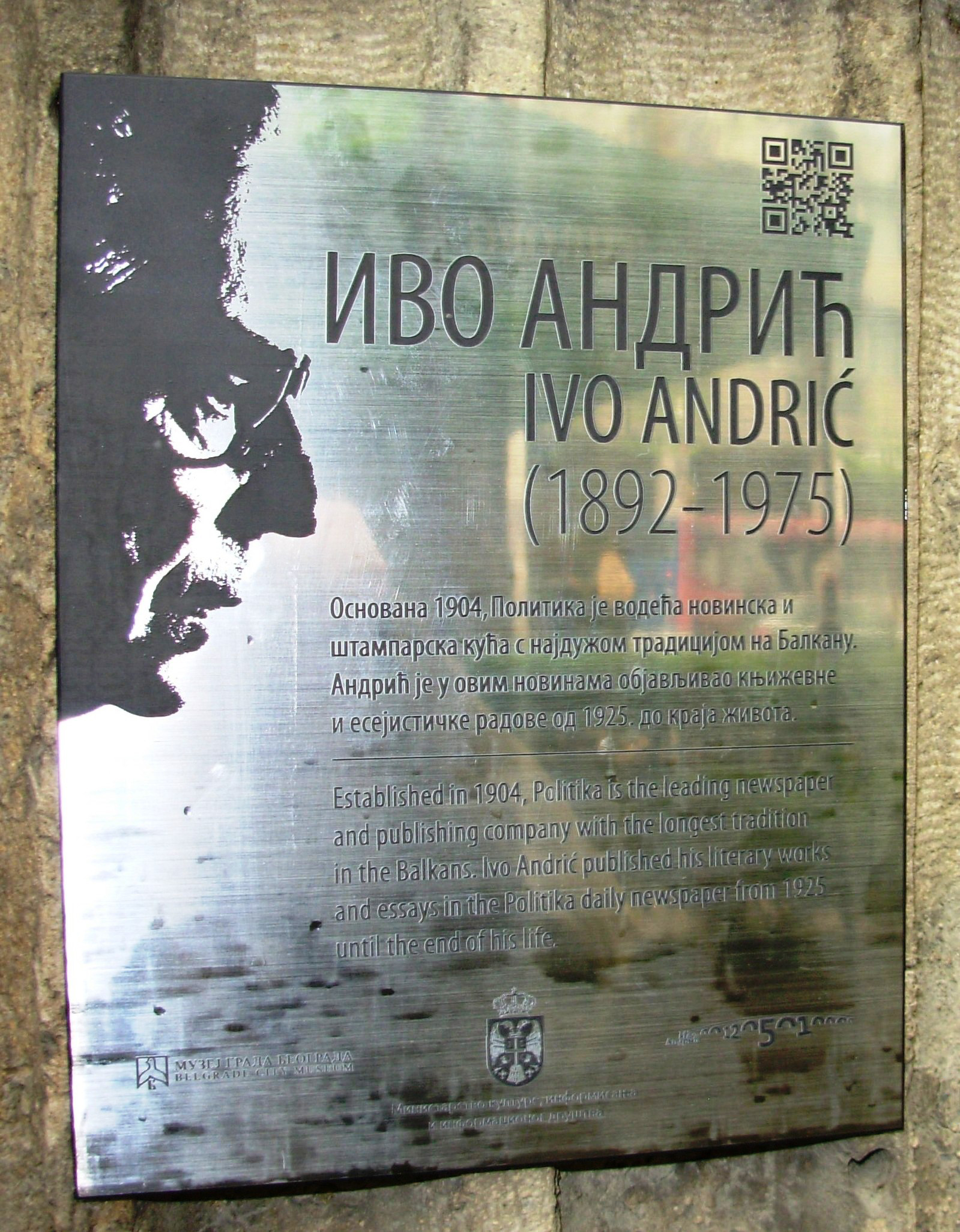
Plaque dedicated to Ivo Andrić on the wall of Politika's headquarters in Belgrade

According to the investigative journalist organisation KRIK, Politika published over 96 biased and unfounded articles in its newspaper in 2024.

== Notable persons ==
=== Journalists ===
Incomplete data:

- Darko F. Ribnikar
- Branislav Nušić
- Milutin Uskoković
- Stevan Sremac
- Maga Magazinović
- Darko V. Ribnikar
- Stanislav Vinaver
- Vojin Đorđević
- Živojin Balugdžić (XYZ)
- Petar Pjer Križanić (caricaturist)
- Radosav Ljumović
- Lazar Lilić
- Anđa Bunuševac
- Živojin Bata Vukadinović
- Gojko Božović
- Biserka Matić Spasojević

=== International Correspondents ===
Incomplete data:

- Ivan Đaja, from Paris
- Svetolik Petrović, from Paris
- Rafael Talvi, from London

=== Associates ===
Incomplete data:

- Osman Đikić
- Petar Kočić
- Aleksa Šantić
- Ivo Ćipiko
- Milan Stojadinović
- Ivo Andrić
