= List of ambassadors and high commissioners to and from Barbados =

This is a list of ambassadors and high commissioners to and from Barbados as of January 2023.

Country	Heads of Mission to host country from Barbados		Heads of Mission from sending country to Barbados	
Argentina			Gustavo Martinez Pandiani	List
Australia			Bruce Lendon	List
Belgium	Simone Rudder	List		
Brazil	Tonika Sealy-Thompson	List	Vera Lucia dos Santo Caminha Campetti	List
Canada	Gline Clarke	List	Brenda Wells	List
China	Hallam Henry	List	Yan Xiusheng	List
Colombia			Martha Cecilia Pinilla-Perdomo	
Cuba	Philip St. Hill		Yanet Stable Cárdenas	
Finland				
France			Jacques-Henry Heuls	List
Germany				
Ghana	Juliette Bynoe-Sutherland			
Guatemala			Vacant	
Guyana			Cita Indranie Pilgrim	
Holy See				
India			Kadakath Pathrose Ernest	
Ireland				
Jamaica				
Japan			Kayoko Fukushima	List
Kenya	William Alex Mcdonald			
North Korea				
South Korea				
Mexico			Rosario Asela Molinero Molinero	
Netherlands				
New Zealand	Anton Ojala	List	Glyne Samuel Hyvestra Murray	List
Nigeria	Vacant			
Norway				
Panama	Ian Wendell Walcott		Xiomara Pérez	
Pakistan				
Russia			Alexander S. Kurmaz	List
Singapore				
Spain				
Sweden				
Switzerland	Matthew Anthony Wilson			
Trinidad and Tobago	Robert Livingston Morris			
United Arab Emirates	Gabriel Abed			
United Kingdom	Milton Inniss	List	Janet Douglas	List
United States	Noel Lynch	List	Linda Taglialatela	List
Venezuela			Alvaro Sanchez Cordero	

== International organisations ==
Organisation	Representative
European Community	Joy-Ann Skinner
UNESCO	
United Nations	H. Elizabeth Thompson (New York); Chad Blackman (Geneva); Vacant (Nairobi); Vacant (Vienna)
World Trade Organization; World Intellectual Property Organization; United Nations Conference on Trade and Development	
Food and Agriculture Organization	Renata Clarke

== See also ==
- List of Barbados diplomatic posts
- Foreign relations of Barbados
