= Danica Kojić =

Serbian architect (1899–1975)

Danica Kojić (Belgrade, Kingdom of Serbia, 1899 – Belgrade, Yugoslavia, 1975) was a Serbian architect and professional interior designer.

She was born Danica Milovanović in Belgrade in 1899. She earned her degree from the Department of Architecture at the Technical Faculty in Belgrade. From 1924 to 1928 she worked for the Ministry of Construction in Belgrade. In the mid-1920s her practice focused on the interior and exterior design of elementary schools in Serbia.

Branislav Kojić, Danica's husband was a modernist, influenced by Dragutin Inkiostri Medenjak, and one of the founders of the Group of Architects of the Modern Movement (1928–1934). Both Danica and Branislav enjoyed Balkan architectural history and, especially the tradition of rural architecture in Serbia, yet she often worked under her husband. As a result, her contribution to modernism is sometimes underestimated.

She died in 1975 in Belgrade.

== Legacy ==
In the 1980s and 1990s at the Faculty of Architecture of the University of Belgrade, the Danica Kojić Fund was established in recognition of the best graduate work in interior design.

== Works ==
Among the first joint works of the Kojić couple was the Art Pavilion of Cvijeta Zuzorić at Little Kalemegdan in 1928. Together, they created the first dedicated exhibition space in Belgrade, and while the exterior was preserved as Branislav Kojić envisioned and accomplished it, the interior of Danica Kojić disappeared in reconstruction in 1975.

Other works:

- Primary school in Oraškovica village, 1925, B. Kojić, D. Kojić;
- Danica and Branislav Kojić house at 6 Zadarska Street in Belgrade (1927, alterations to the plan and interior decoration;
- Villa of Edward and Danica Zamboni in Dobračina 39 in Belgrade, 1927, interior design;
- Nikola Djordjević's Villa at 18 Timișoara Street in Belgrade, 1929, interior design;
- Urban and architectural design of the Liberation Square in Skopje, 1930, competition project, B. Kojić, D. Kojić;
- Student House of King Peter the First Great Liberator in Skopje, 1930, B. Kojić, D. Kojić;
- Svetislav Marodić House at 3 Ilirska Street in Belgrade, 1932, interior design;
- Alexander Obradović's residential building at 28 Macvanska Street in Belgrade, 1932, interior design;
- Villa of Mihajlo Kojić engineer at 36 Žanke Stokić Street in Belgrade, 1933, interior design;
- Residential building Jelena Kojić at 17 Đure Salaja Street in Belgrade, 1937, interior design.

== See also ==
- Jelisaveta Načić
- Jovanka Bončić-Katerinić
- Milica Krstić
- Desanka Jovanović
- Anđelija Pavlović
- Ružica Ilić
- Ljubica Todorović
