= Mihailo Milovanović =

Serbian painter, sculptor and writer

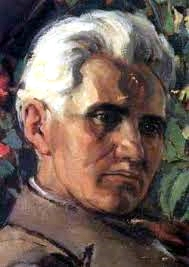
Self-portrait

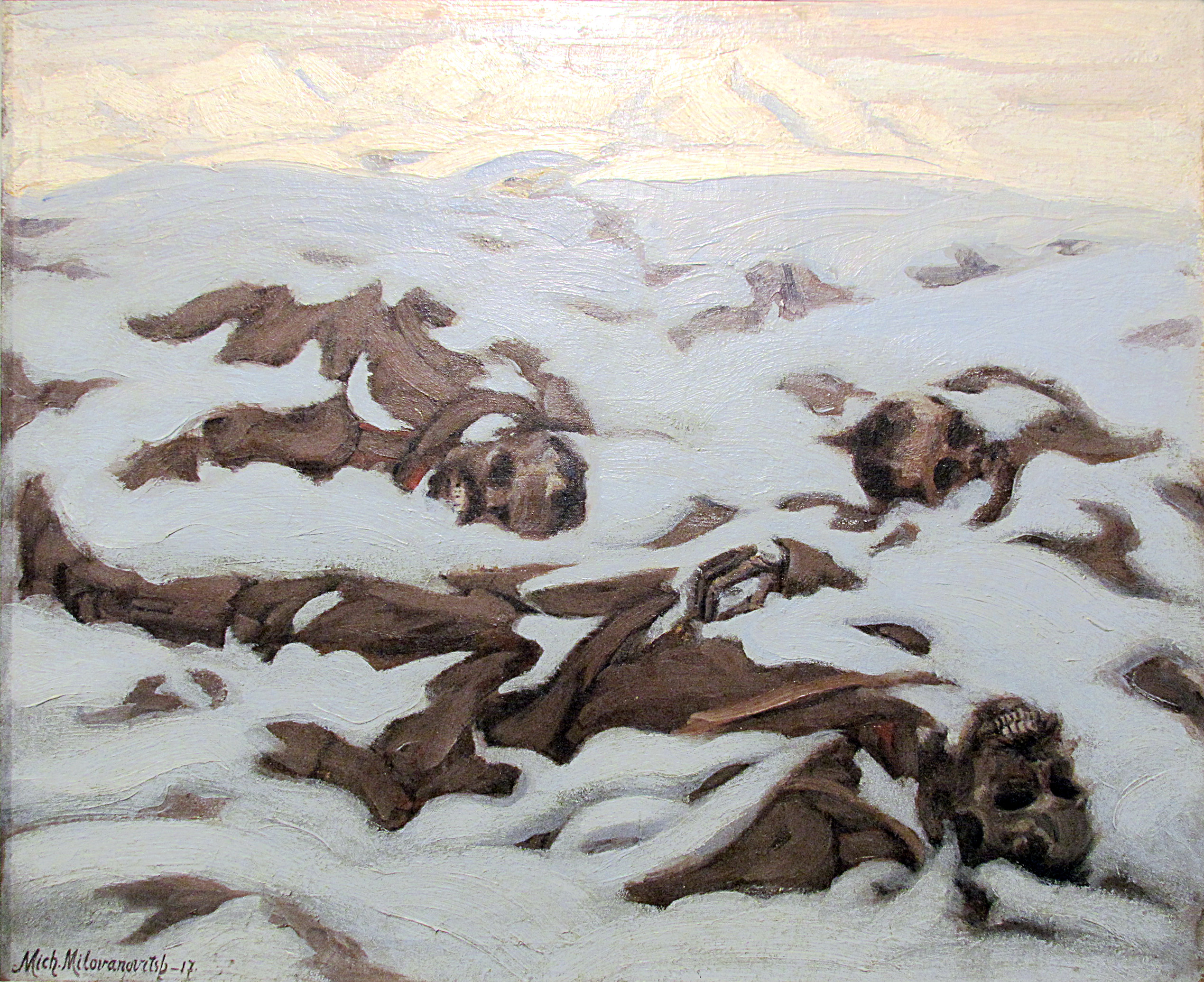
Peace (1917)

Mihailo Milovanović (Gostinica, Serbia, 24 February 1879 – Užice, Kingdom of Yugoslavia, 28 November 1941) was a Serbian painter, sculptor and writer. He was one of the founders of the Association of Painters of Serbia (Udruženja likovnih umetnika Srbije). During the First World War, he was a war painter of the Serbian Army's Supreme Command and, as such, he painted portraits of Voivodes Radomir Putnik, Živojin Mišić, Stepa Stepanović and Petar Bojović, as well as General Pavle Jurišić Šturm, King Peter I of Serbia and Regent Alexander Karađorđević.

== Biography ==
In 1905, Mihailo Milovanović enrolled at the Academy of Fine Arts, Munich, where he studied first under the direction of Ludwig von Herterich and then Hugo von Habermann, a painter renowned for his portraits. Milovanović graduated from the academy in 1909. Then, he went to the Prague Academy of Fine Arts where he found several compatriots.

In 1912, Milovanović returned to Serbia when the First Balkan War broke out and joined the army as a volunteer. Other Serbian artists, including his colleagues Dragomir Glišić, Petar Ranosović, and Milan Milovanović were also painting and drawing on the front lines. In 1915 he participated in the difficult Serbian army's retreat through Albania.

Mihailo Milovanović was killed in Užice at the end of November 1941 by Tito's Communist partisans who supposedly mistook him for an English spy. After the Second World War and in the days of the Socialist Federal Republic of Yugoslavia, he was completely overshadowed, his name was conveniently omitted in encyclopedias devoted to art. To add insult to injury, the art authorities in Belgrade attributed most of Mihailo Milovanović paintings to Milan Milovanović instead.

== See also ==
- List of painters from Serbia
- War artist
