= Čolak-Antić family =

The Čolak-Antić family (also spelt Tcholak-Antitch) is a Serbian family with prominent members since the time of Revolutionary Serbia. The family's surname, originally a patronymic, came from Vojvoda Čolak-Anta Simeonović, a military commander under Karađorđe, during the First Serbian Uprising against Ottoman rule, and the eponymous founder of the family.

== Genealogy ==
Note: This family tree is not intended to be exhaustive, but rather aims to show the principal public figures of the Čolak-Antić family.

1. Vojvoda Čolak-Anta Simeonović (1777–1853), military commander during the First Serbian uprising
  twice married (to Jelena then to Stoja)
  1. Konstantin – Kosta Čolak-Antić (about 1809–1848)
    x to Jovanka Mitrović, related to Prince Maksim Rasković
    1. Ilija Čolak-Antić (1836–1894), commander during the Serbo-Turkish War
      x Jelena Matić, daughter of Dimitrije Matić, president of the National Assembly of Serbia.
      1. Jovanka Čolak-Antić
        x to Ilija Vukićević, writer and playwright.
      2. Boško Čolak-Antić (1871–1949), Marshal of the Court and diplomat.
      3. Vojin Čolak-Antić (1877–1945), Royal Serbian Army and Royal Yugoslav Army general
        x to Marija Grujić daughter of prime minister Sava Grujić, descendant of Vule Ilic Kolarac.
        1. Ilya Čolak-Antić (1905–1974), major in the General Staff of the Royal Yugoslav Army
        2. Grujica Čolak-Antić (1906–1967), major in the Royal Yugoslav Army
          x Jovanka Marinković, granddaughter of Milovan Marinković (three-time mayor of Belgrade)
        3. Petar Čolak-Antić (1907–1964), lieutenant colonel in the Royal Yugoslav Army
          x Milica Hadžić, daughter of Živojin Hadžić (Member of the National Assembly of Serbia)
    2. Lazar K. Čolak-Antić (1839–1877), lieutenant colonel during the Serbo-Turkish War
      1. Milica Čolak-Antić
        x Vladislav F. Ribnikar, founder of Politika
        1. Danica Ribnikar
          x Sir John S. Bennett, career diplomat and SOE agent during WWII.
    3. Ljubomir Čolak-Antić, director of the Serbian Military Arsenal
  2. Ana Čolak-Antić
    x to Antonije Djordjević
        1. Ljubica Marić (1909–2003), composer
  3. Jovanka Čolak-Antić
    x to P. Trpezić
    1. Miloš Trpezić
      x to Anka Hristić (1848-1891), daughter of prime minister Nikola Hristić and granddaughter of Toma Vučić Perišić
      1. Ana Trpezić
        x to Aleksandar Nedeljković, son of professor Milan Nedeljković and Tomanija Radaković, lady of the Imperial Court of Russia.
    2. Mileva Naumović
      x to Colonel Jovan Naumović, son of Naum Krnar
      1. Mihailo Naumović, lieutenant colonel in the General Staff
        x to Ljubica Đurić, daughter of General Dimitrije Đurić and granddaughter of Dimitrije Matić
        1. Milivoje Naumović, Chetnik commander during the Balkan Wars and World War One
          x to Milena Milojević, granddaughter of minister Jevrem Grujić.
  4. Marija Čolak-Antić
    x to M. Hadžić
        1. Dragica Vučković
          x to Colonel Milivoje Petrović, great-grandson of Hajduk Veljko
          1. Captain Veljko Petrović
            x to Anđelija Mišić, daughter of Field Marshal Živojin Mišić
  5. Pavle Čolak-Antić (mother Stoja)
    x to Jelena Milovanović sister of painter Milan Milovanović
    1. Voivoda Milivoje Čolak-Antić (1884–1944), Chetnik commander during the Balkan Wars
      x to Jovana Ghazis (1892–1987) relative of prime minister Milan Stojadinović
    2. Milica Čolak-Antić Krstić (1887–1964), architect
    3. Antonije Čolak-Antić (1890–1908), composer

== Sources ==
- Bjelajac, Mile (2020). "Čolak-Antić". Family tradition of the military profession in Serbla, military elite 1804-1941 (PDF) (in Serbian). Vol. Yearbook for Social History 1-2/1996. Belgrade, Serbia: Association for Social History (Department of General History, Faculty of Philosophy). pp. 90–94.
