= Barbados–China relations =

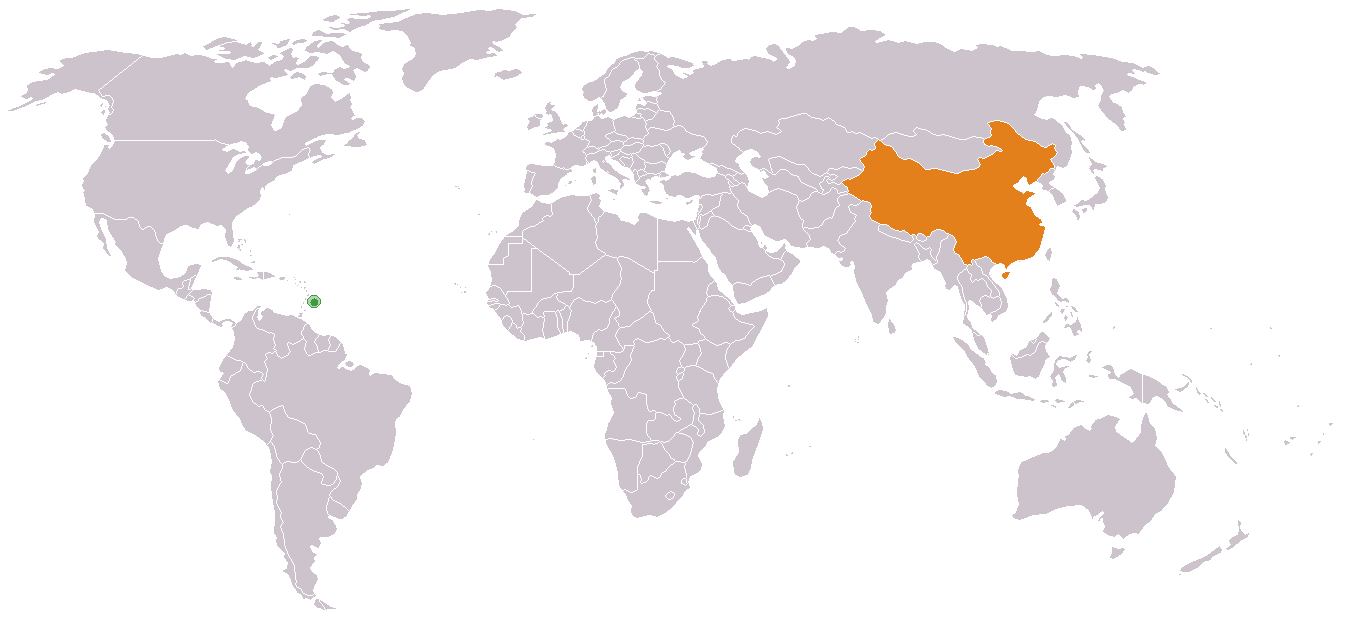
- Barbados: China

Diplomatic mission
- Embassy of Barbados, Beijing: Embassy of China, Bridgetown

Envoy
- Ambassador Hallam Henry: Ambassador Yan Xiusheng

Barbados–China relations
- Traditional Chinese: 巴巴多斯-中國關係
- Simplified Chinese: 巴巴多斯-中国关系
Transcriptions

Relations between Barbados and China began on 4 September 1967 with Barbados recognizing the People's Republic of China from 30 May 1977, just over one decade after the eastern Caribbean island nation's independence from the United Kingdom.

Chinese-Barbadian trade relations have intensified over the decades and are growing, and have expanded in both: growing bilateral trade and strategic cooperation. Given the inherent limit of natural resources in Barbados, various Chinese administrations have taken interest in investing in the construction of infrastructure to support Barbados' human capital like aiding in the construction of the Sir Garfield Sobers Gymnasium (1986), and other projects such as: construction assistance for the Sir Lloyd Erskine Sandiford Conference and Cultural Centre (1994), and renovating Bridgetown's Cheapside Market building (2005). Some media sources have claimed Barbados was highly indebted to China, however Barbadian officials have called such claims as being a "falsehood" and "innuendos" and stated that less than 2.5% of the external debt of the country (~$300m) is owed to China.

Barbados adheres with the One China policy as it recognizes the PRC as the sole legitimate government of "China" rather than the Republic of China (ROC). The PRC has an embassy to Bridgetown; and Barbados has an embassy in Beijing, along with a consulate in Hong Kong, SAR The current Chinese Ambassador to Barbados is Yan Xiusheng, who heads the embassy in suburb of Christ Church, Barbados.

Barbados and China are members of the Belt and Road Initiative trade agreement, the Caribbean Development Bank, the Group of 77, and the United Nations. The relationship between both nations partly falls under the larger regional China–CELAC Forum.

== History ==
In 2004 Barbados was added to China's list of officially approved tourist destinations by the government in China. with Barbados' former Prime Minister pushing for an open air accord between both nations.

Over the years a number of building projects have been carried out with Chinese government assistance these include: The Wildey Gymnasium, two adjustments on the Lloyd Erskine Sandiford Conference And Cultural Centre, a Home Vegetable Growing Experimental Center, embroidery, grass weaving and feather handicraft. A consideration was also giving according to the Prime Minister of Barbados, David Thompson for China to assist with the opening of a new cruise ship facility in Barbados.

Following the 2008 Sichuan earthquake, the Barbadian prime minister visited the Chinese Embassy to personally sign the book of condolence to the nation.

In July 2010 Barbados opened its first resident Barbadian Embassy in Chaoyang District, Beijing.

In 2014 the two governments signed visa waiver agreements for travel by nationals from both nations. Later in 2014 there was also an agreement signed in Barbados to establish a branch of the Confucius Institute at the University of the West Indies.

In late 2015 the Chinese Navy hospital Ark ship visited the Bridgetown port.

In 2018 the newly elected Mottley administration stated its desire to enter the then five year old Belt and Road Initiative (BRI). In February 2019 Barbados and China signed a MOU for Barbados to officially join the BRI. He Lifeng, chairman of the Chinese National Development and Reform Commission (NDRC), and Jerome Walcott, minister of foreign affairs and foreign trade of Barbados, held talks in Beijing, and the two sides exchanged views on jointly building BRI cooperation between China and Barbados.

Later that year China's resident Ambassador to Barbados, announced 11 graduate students would be sponsored to study in China. This recent figure brings to a total of over 90 Barbadians who have taken part in the studying in China programme. Other goals outlined in 2019 included China providing technical assistance and funding for building a laboratory to ensure international product accreditation standards and address sanitary and phytosanitary rules of the World Trade Organisation (WTO).

In 2020 the first batch of roughly three dozen BYD rechargeable electric buses were delivered to the Government's Barbados Transport Board.

In late 2020 the British media reported that United States military intelligence spread an allegation to the Boris Johnson United Kingdom government that Barbados was dropping the Queen as Chief of State to appease China.

The Chinese government is also offering scholarships directly to students and professionals for further training in China. In 2024 Vcom International Ltd. and Barbados announced a partnership in Vocational educational cooperation.

== Trade and economic cooperation ==
Countries which signed cooperation documents related to the Belt and Road Initiative

As of 2025 cooperation has spanned the industries of: scholarships, culture, sports, electric buses, solar lights, food security, and projects such as the Dukes Agricultural Research Park and the National Stadium redevelopment. Further plans by Chinese ambassador have proposed collaboration into- tourism, airlift, logistics, and disaster resilience. The Barbados and China has evolved over time and today is considered one of Barbados's closest allies and partners. China is also one of Barbados's increasingly important trading and export partners. In 2013 China's foreign direct investment to Barbados surpassed the United Kingdom's for the first time. As of 2017 China was third only to the US and Trinidad & Tobago as Barbados' largest import market, with an import share of 5.65 per cent, according to World Integrated Trade Solution (WITS) data.

| Year | Barbadian Exports to China / Chinese Imports from Barbados | Barbadian Imports from China / Chinese Exports to Barbados |
|---|---|---|
| 1999 | USD13,000 | USD2,035,000 |
| 2005 | USD211,000 | USD19,000,000 |
| 2017 | USD5.7 million | USD93 million |

Both nations have additionally signed bilateral agreements including a Double taxation agreement, (updated 2010) and a Reciprocal Promotion and Protection of Investments treaty.

The Chinese government remains one of the main stakeholders in the Barbados-based Caribbean Development Bank (CDB), which lends to the various territories throughout the Caribbean region.

In 2004 Chinese interests expanded into Barbados' construction industry. Two notable firms include China Construction Barbados Co. Ltd. and ChinaDOS Construction Limited. (A mixture of the name China and Barbados), Which has performed a number of construction projects in Barbados.

In August 2008 the Barbados-based Caribbean Export and Chinese officials signed a deal to increase the export capacity in the region to the Chinese market.

In 2010 a high-level Chinese delegation from the China National Tourism Administration (CNTA) visited the Government of Barbados' tourism unit to ink a branding opportunity for a Barbados tourism website targeting Chinese visitors to Barbados.

Barbados was one of the first nations in the region to sign on to the China's Belt and Road Cooperative initiative. Later the same year the Association for Barbados-China Friendship (ABCF) was formed in Barbados

Barbadian officials have showcased Barbadian made brands at such major Chinese annual events as the CIIE, Beijing Expo 2019, and Shanghai World Expo.

== Diplomacy ==
=== One-China stance ===
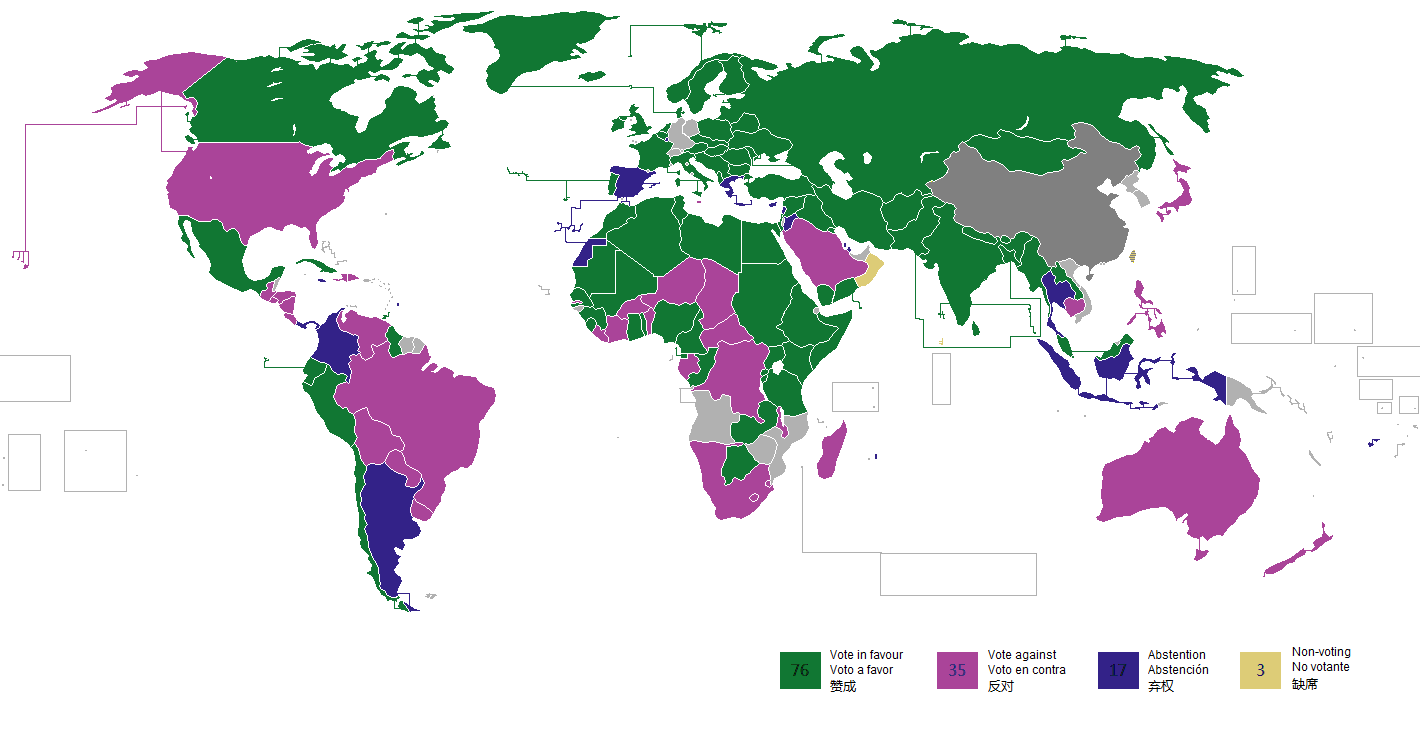
Barbados abstained in the vote on the Chinese seat change in the United Nations.

Following the Chinese Civil War, commencing on 4 September 1967 for a brief period Barbados witnessed one-way incoming diplomatic relations from the Republic of China (R.O.C.), commonly called Taiwan. Barbados hadn't, yet established diplomatic relations with the larger "mainland" People's Republic of China (P.R.C.) until after breaking off relations with the Republic of China (Taiwan) on January 11, 1977, Barbados moved to instead recognise the mainland government in the People's Republic of China on 30 May 1977 when the Government of Barbados then ceased to recognize Taiwan as the legitimate government of China.

The following is a statement made by the late Henry DeBoulay Forde, S.C., P.C., former Attorney General and Minister of External Affairs on the China issue in a report issued by the Government of Barbados outlined in 1977 to summarize the country's One-China policy until then.

"Barbados had maintained diplomatic relations with the Republic of China, commonly known as Taiwan, since 4 September 1967. A Taiwanese Embassy was established in Barbados in 1968, but a Barbadian ambassador had never been accredited towards Taiwan. On the occasion of the United Nations debate on the admission of the People's Republic of China to that body, the Barbados delegation expressed the hope that a compromise formula would have been found to have enabled the government of the People's Republic of China. - Neither Taiwan nor the People's Republic of China has, however, been willing to reach this accommodation or to accept the principle of the existence of "two Chinas".

On 25 October 1971, the United Nations General Assembly voted overwhelmingly "to restore all its rights to the People's Republic of China and to recognise its representatives as the only legitimate representatives of China."

Under the circumstances the Government of Barbados of the day considered that "it can no longer validly treat the Government of Taiwan as the Government of all China. The government of Taiwan had therefore been officially informed that, as from today[11 January 1977], it will no longer be recognised by the Government of Barbados as the Government of China. It is believed, and my Government believes that failure to take this position would be to turn a blind eye to the realities of the international situation and be contrary to our best interest." Since the 1980s Barbados has upheld to the position of there being only one-china based in Beijing.

== Joint military cooperation ==
In October 2006 the Barbadian government found itself sanctioned by U.S. President George W. Bush for not signing an Article 98 Agreements with the United States military to exempt U.S. personnel from the International Criminal Court (ICC). Following the sanctions on Barbados and several other Caribbean nations by the United States the Chinese Government provided Barbados with the financial assistance in-lieu of the situation.

In 2009 the military units of both countries moved to strengthen their military cooperation. Then in December 2016 expanded this military cooperation with the Chinese government presenting the government of Barbados with $3 million worth of military equipment which had been the largest gift to the Barbados military to date.

== Diplomatic characterization ==
Former Barbadian Prime Minister J.M.G.M 'Tom' Adams during a visit to China expressed a satisfaction over the development of bilateral relations since the establishment of diplomatic ties. Praising the Chinese policy of "non-interference in other countries' internal affairs", Adams stated: "it is often comparatively difficult to maintain good relations between big and small countries since good bilateral relations lie in ironing out mutual differences and eliminating the control over the small countries by the big ones. The relations of Barbados and other Caribbean countries with China are different. China has never interfered in any way in the internal affairs of Barbados and other countries, and never has it disrupted peace of Barbados and the Caribbean region."

Former Barbadian Prime Minister Owen S. Arthur urged his Chinese counterparts to provide development-aide to the smaller Caribbean economies regional fund and opinioned that: "Any cooperation in tourism should not be only about the movement of people, but we must assist each other in the development of our industries…… and when we have special events we must make it possible for our citizens to attend these activities. This would help build a base for a stronger relationship in the future," Mr. Arthur said. Chinese Premier Wen Jiabao said that China would like to join hands with Barbados in deepening cooperation in the areas of trade, tourism, architecture, and cultural exchange.

CCP general secretary Xi Jinping of China characterised the relationship with Barbados in 2021 as "a good friend, and partner of China."

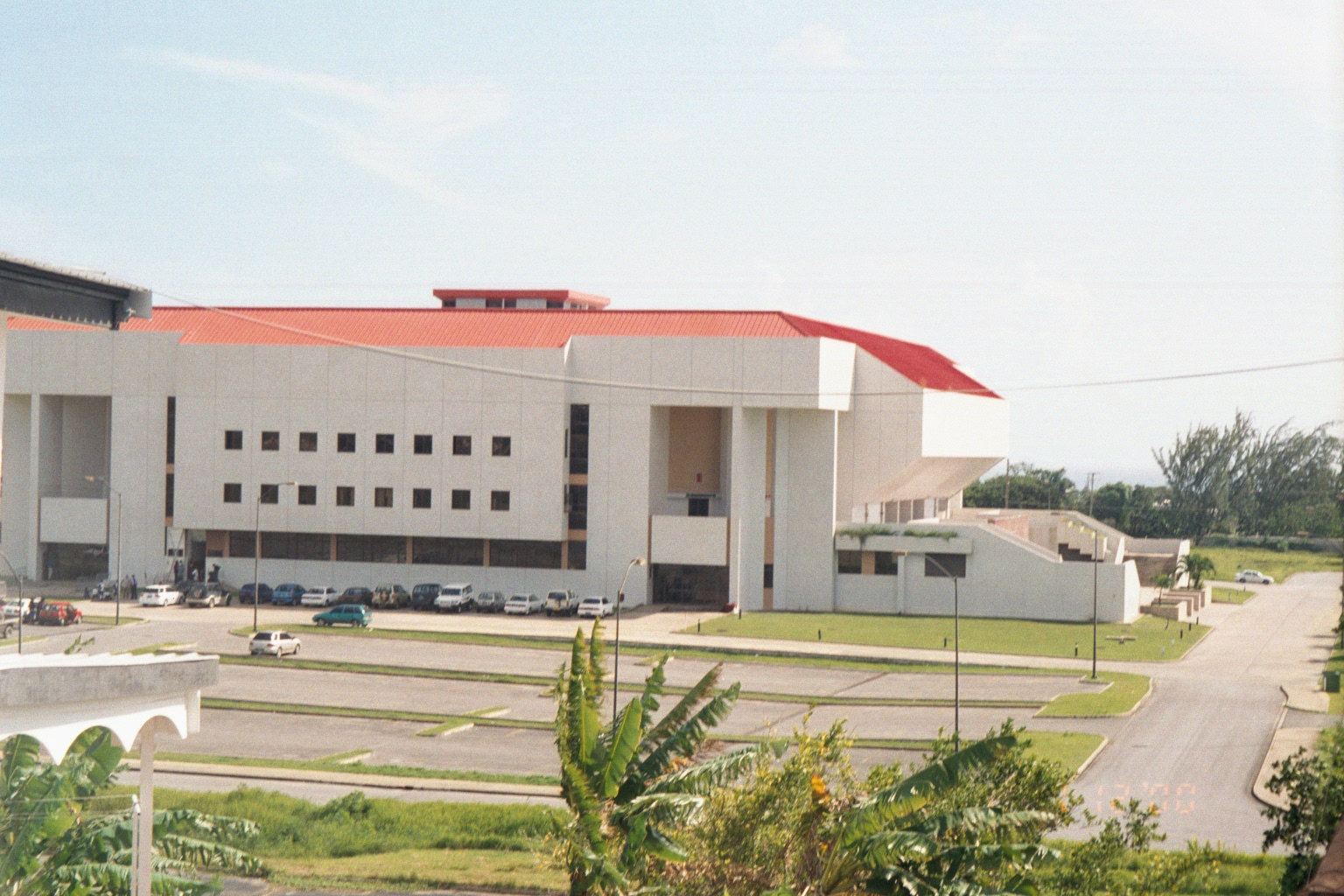
The Wildey Gymnasium in Barbados which was built in 1992 with assistance of the P.R.C.

Projects in Barbados include:

- Feasibility Study Project for the Redevelopment of the Barbados National Stadium (2007,10)
- Sir Garfield Sobers Gymnasium Project (1990–1992)
- Sherbourne Conference Centre Fitting-up Project (1993–1994)
- Cheapside Market Renovation Project (2001–2002)
- Sir Garfield Sobers Gymnasium Redevelopment Project (1996–1997; 2005, 7–2005, 9, 2011)
- Home Vegetable Growing Experimental Centre Project (1983–1987)
- Embroidery and Grass Weaving Project (1985–1987) and
- Feather Handicraft Project (1992–1995).
- Elsie Payne Ministry of Education Complex Redevelopment
- Sam Lord's Castle Redevelopment Project (2017)

=== Bilateral agreements ===
| Date | Agreement name | Notes |
|---|---|---|
| 1977-May-30 | Joint Communiqué on the Establishment of Diplomatic Relations between the People's Republic of China and Barbados | |
| 1980-June-13 | Cultural Agreement between the Government of the People's Republic of China and the Government of Barbados | |
| 1986-May-16 | Agreement between China and Barbados on the Construction of a Gymnasium in Barbados with Chinese Assistance | |
| 1990-May-11 | Agreement between the Government of the People's Republic of China and the Government of Barbados on Economic and Technological Cooperation | |
| 1992-July-27 | Agreement between the Government of the People's Republic of China and the Government of Barbados on Economic and Technological Cooperation | |
| 1996-May | Exchange of Notes between the Government of the People's Republic of China and the Government of Barbados on Providing Gratuitous Assistance to the Barbados Government by the Chinese Government | |
| 1997-April-30 | Agreement between the Government of the People's Republic of China and the Government of Barbados on the Retention of Honorary Consulate in Hong Kong SAR of China by Barbados | |
| 1998-July | Agreement between the Government of the People's Republic of China and the Government of Barbados on Encouragement and Mutual Protection of Investment | |
| 2000-May-15 | Agreement between the Government of the People's Republic of China and the Government of Barbados on the Avoidance of Double Taxation and the Prevention of Tax Evasion | |
| 2000-October | Exchange of Notes between the Government of the People's Republic of China and the Government of Barbados on Providing Gratuitous Assistance to the Barbados Government by the Chinese Government | |
| 2005-February | Memorandum of Understanding between the National Tourism Administration of the People's Republic of China and the Ministry of Tourism of Barbados on the Facilitation of Group Travel by Chinese Tourists to Barbados | |
| 2006-June-6 | 2 Agreements between the Government of the People's Republic of China and the Government of Barbados on Economic and Technological Cooperation | |

=== Common memberships ===
- Bank for International Settlements
- Belt and Road Initiative
- Caribbean Development Bank
- Food and Agriculture Organization
- G-77+China
- International Court of Justice
- International Electrotechnical Commission
- International Maritime Organization
- International Monetary Fund
- International Olympic Committee
- International Renewable Energy Agency
- International Telecommunication Union
- Interpol
- Nuclear Non-Proliferation Treaty
- Small Island Developing States
- United Nations
- United Nations Educational, Scientific and Cultural Organization (UNESCO)
- Universal Postal Union
- World Bank
- World Customs Organization
- World Health Organization
- World Meteorological Organization
- World Trade Organization

== Twin or sister cities / towns ==
- 2023 – Bridgetown, St. Michael – Province of Hunan,

== Resident diplomatic missions ==
- Barbados appointed its 4th former Prime Minister Sir Lloyd Erskine Sandiford as its first resident Barbadian Ambassador to Beijing, China in July, 2010.
- China has both a resident embassy and Economic and Commercial Affairs Office in Christ Church, which is headed by the Ambassador of the People's Republic of China to Barbados.

== See also ==
- Caribbean–China relations
- List of ambassadors of China to Barbados
- Visa requirements for Chinese citizens
- History of Chinese foreign policy
- Foreign relations of China
  - Foreign relations of imperial China
  - Foreign relations of Hong Kong
  - Foreign relations of Macao
  - Foreign relations of Taiwan
