= Milivoje Čolak-Antić =

Royal Serbian Army officer (1884–1944)

- Born: 5 April 1884; Kragujevac, Serbia
- Died: 15 April 1944 (aged 60); Belgrade
- Relatives: Milica Krstić (sister)
- Military career
- Allegiance: Serbia; Yugoslavia
- Branch: Cavalry; General Staff
- Service years: 1906–1935
- Rank: Colonel; Vojvoda
- Conflicts: Macedonian Struggle; Balkan Wars; World War I
- Awards: Order of Karađorđe's Star; Medal for Bravery, Gold; Order of the White Eagle; Order of St. Sava; Order of the Yugoslav Crown (2); Order Of The Crown (Ro); Order of the White Lion (Cz)

Milivoje Čolak-Antić (5 April 1884 – 15 April 1944) was a Royal Serbian Army officer, most notable for his command of the Chetniks volunteer detachments in Macedonia during the Balkan Wars, and his actions with Operation Departments during World War I for which he received multiple awards.

== Biography ==
Milivoje P. Čolak-Antić was born on 5 April 1884 in Kragujevac, his paternal grandfather was Vojvoda Čolak-Anta Simeonović a renowned rebel leader under Karađorđe during the First Serbian Uprising, while his mother Jelena was the sister of painter Milan Milovanović; he had a sister Milica and a brother Antonije. After graduating from the Imperial Lyceum in Constantinople, he entered the Military Academy in September 1902.

Čolak-Antić graduatued from the military academy in 1906 as infantry second lieutenant. In 1907 he transferred to the Cavalry, volunteered to serve as platoon leader of Komita in southern Serbia during the Macedonian Struggle before becoming platoon officer in the 4th Cavalry Regiment from 1907 to 1911. The following year he was sent to France to train with the 7e Regiment de Dragons.

At the start of the First Balkan War, two Chetnik detachments were established in Macedonia with one of them, the Transvardar detachment placed under his command. His unit was sent in the area of Poreče, Kičevo and Debar representing 16 companies. The task of Čolak Antić and his Chetnik companies was to act as the vanguard of the Royal Serbian Army in Macedonia facing the Ottoman forces. Čolak-Antić later served as platoon officer in the 4th cavalry regiment, platoon officer based in Smederevska Palanka and commander of the 2nd Squadron of the 4th Cavalry Regiment until the end of the war. Towards the end of 1913 he returned to France to study at the École supérieure de guerre in Paris.

Following the invasion of Serbia, and the start of the First World War, Čolak-Antić served with the Operations Department of the Third Army Headquarters until March 1915, before being sent to the Military Delegation in Romania as intelligence officer. For the next two years Čolak-Antić served in the Operations Department of the Headquarters of the Third Army and as adjutant to the Minister of Defence in Shkoder, Corfu and Thessaloniki. In 1917, he then joined the Operations Department of the Supreme Command then the Operations Department of the Headquarters of the First Army. During the Salonika Trial he took part as witness alongside his cousin Colonel Boško Čolak-Antić. In 1917 he became a liaison officer in the Headquarters of the Allied Army of the Orient and was assigned to the Operations Department of the Headquarters of the Cavalry Division a position he held until March 1918.

Following the liberation of the country, after serving with the Operational Department of the Second Army's staff, he returned to the Higher Military School in Paris as a cadet. On his return he was appointed commander of the IV Squadron of the VI Cavalry Regiment, in 1922 joined the general staff, becoming in 1923 lieutenant colonel and assistant commander of the VI Cavalry Regiment, before serving as acting chief of staff of the First Cavalry Division. In 1927, after serving as acting commander of the VIII Cavalry Regiment, he was promoted to Colonel and appointed military attaché in Poland. Towards the end of 1927 he served as head of staff of Navy command in Montenegro followed by commander of the VI Cavalry Regiment, and in 1935 commander of the Dubrovnik garrison in Croatia. At his request, he retired and transferred to the reserve in 1935.

== Personal life ==
Čolak-Antić married Jovana, daughter of Jovan and Klara Gaci from Corfu, the Gaci ran the Bella Venezia hotel which hosted the Serbian government during the occupation of the country. Čolak-Antić and his wife had a son Pavle and a daughter Maja Maria. His sister Milica Krstić became one of the most important female architects in Serbia and Yugoslavia. Čolak-Antić died during the bombing of Belgrade on 15 April 1944, days before the liberation of Yugoslavia.

== Military ranks ==
As a commissioned officer Čolak-Antić held the following ranks:

- Second lieutenant, 1906
- Lieutenant, 1910
- Captain II class, 1913
- Cavalry captain I class, 1915
- Cavalry major, 1918
- Cavalry lieutenant colonel, 1923
- Cavalry colonel, 1927

== Honours ==
For his action during war as well as in peace time Čolak-Antić was awarded several awards:

Serbia/Yugoslavia

- Order of Karađorđe's Star
- Medal for Bravery, Gold
- Order of the White Eagle
- Order of St. Sava
- Order of the Yugoslav Crown (2)

Romania

- Order Of The Crown

Czechoslovakia

- Order of the White Lion

== See also ==
- Čolak-Antić family
