= List of ambassadors of France to Barbados =

The diplomatic representation of the France to Barbados is located at the French Embassy in Castries, the capital of Saint Lucia, and its ambassador has been Francis Étienne since 2022.

== French ambassadors to Barbados ==
From	To	Ambassadoe	Residence
1968	1975	Paul Le Mintier de Léhélec	Port of Spain
1975	1979	Henri Chollet	Port of Spain
1979	1983	René de Choiseul-Praslin	Port of Spain
1983	1984	Françoise Claude-Lafontaine	Port of Spain
1984	1987	Jean Le Cannelier	Port of Spain
1987	1991	Jane Debenest	Port of Spain
1991	1995	Denis Nardin	Port of Spain
1995	1999	Pierre Ariola	Port of Spain
1999	2004	Olivier Pelen	Port of Spain
2004	2008	Charley Causeret	Port of Spain
2008	2012	Michel Trinquier	Port of Spain
2012	2015	Jacques Sturm	Port of Spain
2015	2016	Éric de la Moussaye	Castries
2016	2020	Philippe Ardanaz	Castries
2020	2022	Jacques-Henry Heuls	Castries
2022		Francis Étienne	Castries

== Consulates ==
There is an Honorary Consul in Bridgetown, the capital of Barbados. Since 2011, it has been Captain Don G. Chee-A-Tow, a former airline pilot with the airline LIAT.
