= John S. Bennett =

British diplomat and spy during WWII

John S. Bennett CVO CBE
- Born: John Still Bennett; 22 March 1911
- Died: 10 December 1970 (aged 59); Bridgetown, Barbados
- Education: Clifton College; Peterhouse, Cambridge
- Occupations: Barrister, intelligence officer, diplomat
- Years active: 1936–1970
- Employers: Ministry of Information; Foreign Office
- Spouse: Danica Ribnikar (m. 1943)
- Relatives: Vladislav F. Ribnikar (father-in-law)
- Military career
- Allegiance: United Kingdom
- Branch: Intelligence
- Service years: 1939–1943
- Rank: Major
- Unit: Special Operations Executive (SOE)
- Conflicts: Second World War

John Still Bennett, CVO, CBE (22 March 1911 – 10 December 1970), was a British diplomat, intelligence officer and barrister. During the Second World War, he served in the Special Operations Executive (SOE), where he led the organisation's Yugoslav section, contributing to the coordination of Allied efforts in the Balkans.

Following the war, Bennett joined the Diplomatic Service, holding senior posts in Romania, Sweden, the United States, Iran, Singapore, and Thailand. From 1964 to 1966, he served as British Ambassador to Burundi and Rwanda, followed by his final appointment as High Commissioner to Barbados. He was appointed a Commander of the Order of the British Empire and a Commander of the Royal Victorian Order. Bennett married Serbian journalist Danica Ribnikar in 1943 and died in Bridgetown, Barbados in 1990.

== Early life and career ==
John Still Bennett was born on 22 March 1911. He was the son of the Hon. Sir Charles Alan Bennett, a Justice of the High Court in the Chancery Division and a Master of the Bench of Lincoln's Inn, who had served in France during the First World War and was knighted in 1929. His mother was Constance Radeglence, daughter of an officer.

Bennett was educated at Clifton College and went on to read law at Peterhouse, Cambridge. He was called to the bar at Lincoln's Inn in January 1935. That same year, he stood as the Labour Party candidate for Birmingham Edgbaston in the 1935 United Kingdom general election, running against the incumbent Chancellor of the Exchequer, Neville Chamberlain.

== Second World War service ==
In 1939, Bennett joined Section D, a branch of the Secret Intelligence Service responsible for sabotage and subversion. By late April–May 1940, he was posted to Belgrade, Yugoslavia, under diplomatic cover as a consular clerk at the British legation. There, he served as assistant to William Bailey, head of the local liaison mission for the Special Operations Executive (SOE), which had absorbed Section D later that year.

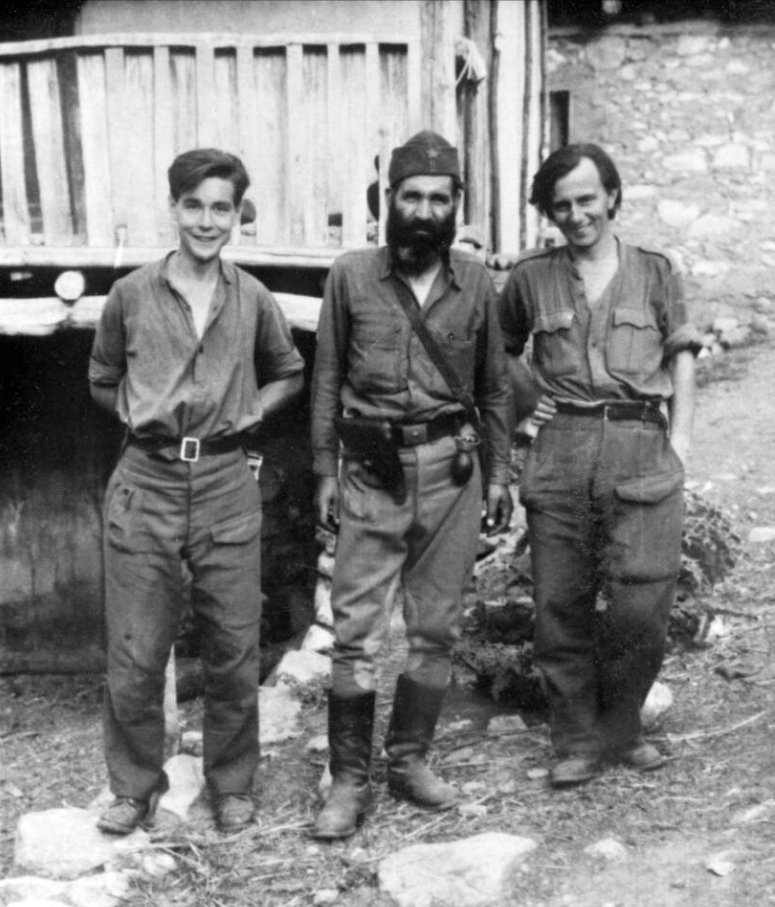
SOE agents with a local fighter during Operation Bethesda, Macedonia, 1944. Bennett led the Yugoslav section during its earlier formation.

Following the fall of France and an increase in German intelligence activity, Yugoslav authorities began taking a firmer stance against British clandestine operations. Bailey and several colleagues were expelled in July 1940, prompting a reorganisation of British personnel in Belgrade. Operational responsibility passed to a small team within the legation that included the assistant naval attaché Alexander Glen, assistant press attaché Julian Amery, and Bennett, all operating under diplomatic protection. Bennett, who had a legal background and prior commercial ties to Yugoslavia, continued reporting to Bailey, who had relocated to Istanbul, and remained involved in coordinating intelligence and propaganda activities.

Between 1940 and 1941, Bennett, alongside Glen and Amery, built close relations with Serbian opposition groups, including the Peasant, Radical, and Democrat parties, to support anti-German resistance, part of a broader SOE strategy that often clashed with the British Legation's diplomatic stance. Following the Axis invasion of Yugoslavia in April 1941, he was appointed head of the SOE's Yugoslav section. Initially operating from Istanbul, he later relocated to General Headquarters in Cairo, reporting to Lieutenant Colonel Terence Airey, then Director of Special Operations.

During this period, Bennett was one of the officers who interviewed James Klugmann, then serving in the Pioneer Corps of the British Army, who was later identified as a KGB agent and a recruiter of members of the Cambridge Five.

As head of the Yugoslav section of SOE in Cairo, Bennett liaised with headquarters in London, where oversight of the Balkans was managed by James Pearson and Colonel Edwin Boxshall. In September 1941, he helped organise Operation Bullseye, the first SOE mission into occupied Yugoslavia. Led by Captain D. T. Bill Hudson and three officers of the Royal Yugoslav Army, the mission aimed to assess conditions on the ground and establish contact with resistance groups. Regarded as one of SOE's best-informed officers on Yugoslav affairs, Bennett was responsible for intelligence and briefings within MO4's Yugoslav section. (Note: MO4 was the codename for the SOE section in Cairo responsible for Yugoslav affairs, including liaison and missions relating to Draža Mihailović and the Chetniks, the royalist resistance operating in occupied Yugoslavia during the war.)

Bennett remained in charge of the Yugoslav section until August 1942, during which he worked with officers such as Basil Davidson, Bill Deakin, Hugh Seton-Watson and James Klugmann. In 1943, he left the SOE to become Director of the British Information Services in Istanbul, representing the Ministry of Information until the end of the war. (Note: The British Information Services (BIS) was a Foreign Office propaganda agency that was sometimes used as cover by the Secret Intelligence Service (MI6).)

== Post-war diplomatic service ==
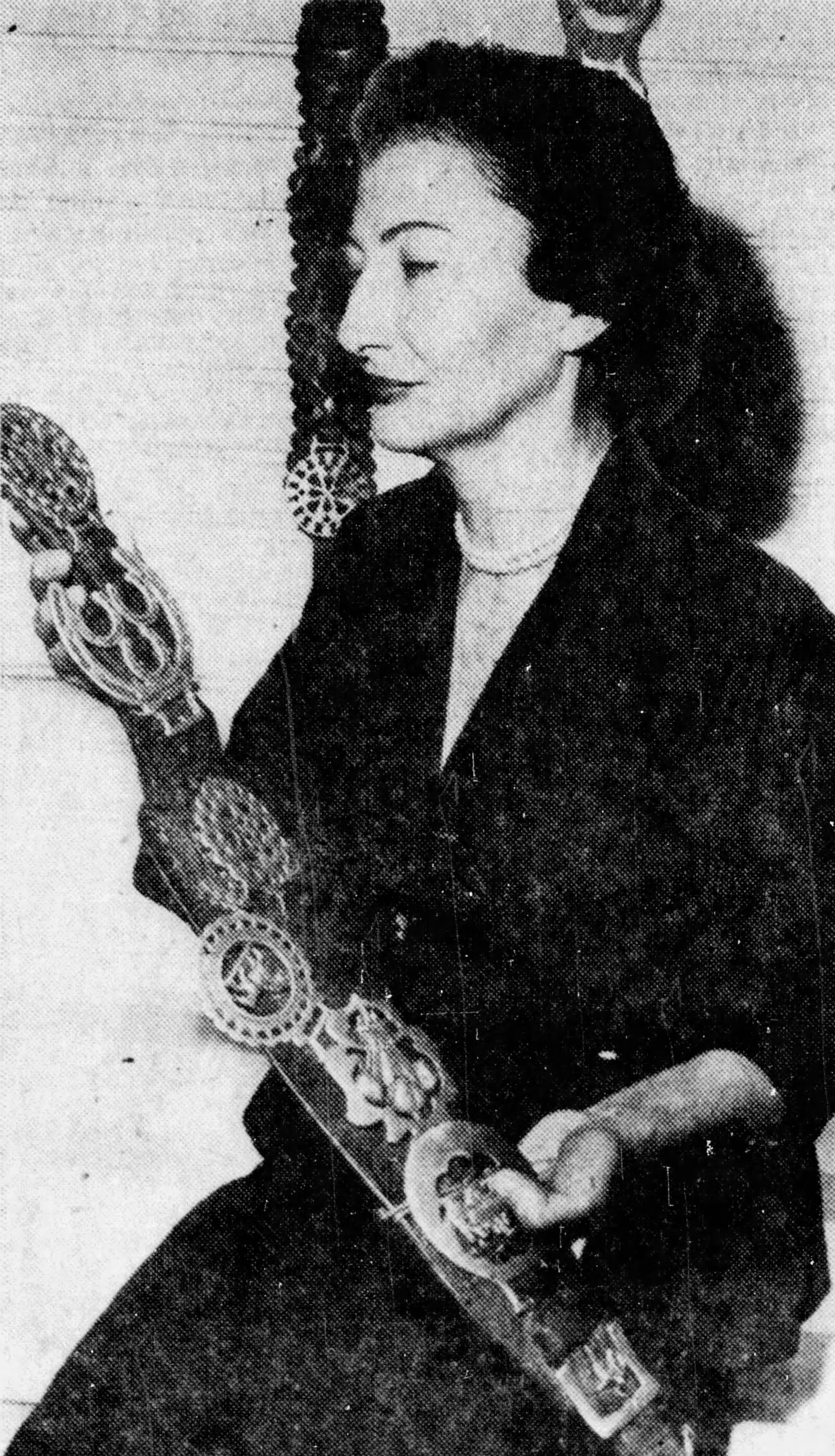
Danica Ribnikar Bennett in Houston, 1953. The image was published in The Houston Post during her husband's diplomatic posting to the United States.

In 1946, Bennett entered the post-war Diplomatic Service with an appointment as First Secretary (Information) at the British legation in Bucharest, Romania, where he served until 1948. He was then posted to Stockholm in 1949, remaining there for three years. In 1952, he was transferred to the United States as Consul in Houston. The following year, he was promoted to Acting Consul-General and to Officer Grade 2 in 1954.

In March 1955, Bennett became Consul General in Khorramshahr, Iran, serving until 1959. He was then appointed Regional Information Officer in Singapore, with the rank of Counsellor, and remained in post from 1959 to 1961. His next assignment was in Bangkok, where he served until 1963. In January 1964, the Foreign Office appointed him Ambassador to Burundi and Rwanda. He held both positions concurrently until October 1966. That November, he was named High Commissioner to Barbados, serving from the island's independence in 1966 until his death in 1970.

== Personal life and death ==
In 1943, Bennett married Serbian journalist Danitsa Mihaylovitch (née Danica Ribnikar) at the British Consulate in Cairo. A columnist for Politika, she was the daughter of Vladislav F. Ribnikar, co-founder of the newspaper, and Milica Čolak-Antić, of the Čolak-Antić family. She disappeared while swimming off the west coast of Barbados in April 1967, and was presumed to have drowned.

Bennett died suddenly of a heart attack on 10 December 1970 in Bridgetown, Barbados. A memorial service was held on 16 December at the chapel of Lincoln's Inn in London, attended by representatives of the Queen, Princess Margaret, and senior figures from the Foreign Office. Mourners included Viscount Belgrave, Lord Belstead, Colin Tennant, Sir Denis Greenhill, and Sir Charles Johnston.

== Honours ==
Bennett was appointed an Officer of the Order of the British Empire (OBE) in the 1959 New Year Honours. He was made a Commander of the Royal Victorian Order (CVO) in 1960, and a Commander of the Order of the British Empire (CBE) on 1 January 1963.

== Notes ==
Diplomatic posts
Preceded by n/a	Consul General in Houston; 3 July 1952–1954	Succeeded by n/a
Preceded by n/a	Consul General in Khorramshahr; 16 March 1955–1959	Succeeded by n/a
Preceded by Sir James Murray	Ambassador to Burundi; 16 January 1964 – 6 October 1966	Succeeded by Vacant
Preceded by n/a	Ambassador to Rwanda; 16 January 1964 – 1966	Succeeded by n/a
Preceded by n/a	High Commissioner to Barbados; 30 November 1966 – 10 December 1970	Succeeded by David Roberts
