= List of high commissioners of the United Kingdom to Barbados =

British High Commissioner to Barbados and the Eastern Caribbean
- Coat of arms of the United Kingdom
- Incumbent; Simon Mustard since 2025
- Inaugural holder: John S. Bennett, CBE, CVO
- Formation: 1966
- Website: www.gov.uk/government/world/barbados

The high commissioner of the United Kingdom to Barbados and the Eastern Caribbean is the United Kingdom's foremost diplomatic representative in Barbados, and head of the UK's diplomatic mission in Bridgetown, Barbados.

As members of Commonwealth of Nations, diplomatic relations between the United Kingdom and Barbados are at the governmental level, rather than between their heads of state (King Charles III is head of state of the U.K., but not of Barbados which became a republic on 30 November 2021). Thus, the countries exchange high commissioners, rather than ambassadors.

The high commission in Barbados also covers several other Commonwealth countries in the Eastern Caribbean:

- Antigua and Barbuda (since June 2008);
- The Commonwealth of Dominica;
- Grenada (since 2006);
- The Federation of Saint Kitts and Nevis (passed from Antigua to Barbados in June 2008);
- Saint Lucia;
- Saint Vincent and the Grenadines (since 2007).

== List of heads of mission ==
=== High commissioners to Barbados ===
- 1966–1970: John S. Bennett, CBE, CVO
- 1971–1973: Sir David Arthur Roberts, KBE, CMG
- 1973–1978: Charles Stuart Roberts, CMG
- 1978–1982: James Stanley Arthur, CMG
- 1982–1983: John Morrison, 2nd Viscount Dunrossil, CMG
- 1983–1986: Sir Giles Bullard, KCVO, CMG
- 1986–1990: Kevin Francis Xavier Burns, CMG
- 1990–1994: Emrys T. Davies, CMG
- 1994–1998: Richard Thomas, CMG
- 1998–2001: Gordon M. Baker
- 2001–2005: C. John B. White
- 2005–2009: Duncan Taylor, CBE
- 2010–2013: Paul Brummell
- 2013–2017: Victoria Dean
- 2017–2020: Janet Douglas
- 2021–2025: Scott Furssedonn-Wood, MVO
- 2025–present: Simon Mustard

== See also ==
- List of ambassadors and high commissioners to and from Barbados
