= List of ambassadors of China to Barbados =

Ambassador of China to Barbados
- National emblem of China
- Residence: Rockley, Christ Church, Bridgetown
- Inaugural holder: Yang Daqun
- Formation: 30 May 1977; 49 years ago
- Website: China's Embassy in Barbados

The ambassador of China to Barbados is the official representative of the People's Republic of China to Barbados.

== List of representatives ==
Designated/accredited	Ambassador	Chinese language zh:中国驻巴巴多斯大使名单	Observations	Premier of the People's Republic of China	Prime Minister of Barbados	Term end
May 30, 1977			The governments in Bridgetown and Beijing established diplomatic relations.	Hua Guofeng	J.M.G.M. "Tom" Adams	
May 30, 1977	Yang Daqun	zh:杨达群	Preparation for opening, Temporary charge d'affaires.	Hua Guofeng	J.M.G.M. "Tom" Adams	May 1979
May 1979	Wang Tao	zh:汪滔 (外交官)	Concurrently as ambassador to Antigua & Barbuda.: In 1982 he was counsellor in Hanoi.	Hua Guofeng	J.M.G.M. "Tom" Adams	April 1984
September 1984	Li Jie	zh:李颉	Concurrently as ambassador to Antigua & Barbuda.	Zhao Ziyang	J.M.G.M. "Tom" Adams; Harold Bernard St. John	May 1986
September 1986	Gu Zhifang	zh:顾志方	Concurrently as ambassador to nations of Antigua & Barbuda and Grenada. Died of illness while in office.	Zhao Ziyang	Errol Barrow	May 1987
September 1987	Lu Zongqing	zh:陆宗卿	Concurrently as ambassador to nations of Antigua & Barbuda and Grenada.	Li Peng	Lloyd Erskine Sandiford	April 1990
September 1990	Zhou Wenzhong	zh:周文重	Concurrently as ambassador to Antigua & Barbuda.	Li Peng	Lloyd Erskine Sandiford	October 1992
November 1992	Jiang Chengzong	zh:江承宗	Concurrently as ambassador to Antigua & Barbuda.	Li Peng	Lloyd Erskine Sandiford; Owen Arthur	November 1996
January 1997	Zhan Daode	zh:詹道德	Concurrently as ambassador to Antigua & Barbuda.	Li Peng; Zhu Rongji	Owen Arthur	January 1999
February 1999	Yang Youyong	zh:杨友勇		Zhu Rongji	Owen Arthur	October 2001
November 2001	Yang Zhikuan	zh:杨智宽		Zhu Rongji; Wen Jiabao	Owen Arthur	March 2005
June 2005	Liu Huanxing	zh:刘焕兴		Wen Jiabao	Owen Arthur; David Thompson	March 2009
May 2009	Wei Qiang	zh:魏强		Wen Jiabao	David Thompson; Freundel Stuart	February 2012
April 2012	Xu Hong	zh:徐宏		Wen Jiabao; Li Keqiang	Freundel Stuart	November 2013
December 2013	Wang Ke	zh:王克 (外交官)		Li Keqiang	Freundel Stuart	September 2017
January 2018	Yan Xiusheng	zh:延秀生		Li Keqiang	Freundel Stuart; Mia Mottley	March 2023

== See also ==
- Ambassadors of China
- Barbados–People's Republic of China relations
- List of ambassadors and high commissioners to and from Barbados
