= David Roberts (diplomat) =

British diplomat

Sir David Arthur Roberts KBE, CMG, CVO

High Commissioner to Barbados
- In office 1971–1973
- Preceded by: John S. Bennett
- Succeeded by: Charles Stuart Roberts

Ambassador to Syria
- In office 1973–1976

High Commissioner to Sierra Leone
- In office 1976–1977

Ambassador to the United Arab Emirates
- In office 1977–1981

Ambassador to Lebanon
- In office 1981–1983

Personal details
- Born: 8 August 1924 United Kingdom
- Died: 7 June 1987 (aged 62) United Kingdom
- Education: Jesus College, Oxford
- Occupation: Diplomat
- Awards: KBE; CMG; CVO

Military service
- Branch/service: Royal Armoured Corps
- Years of service: 1940s

Sir David Arthur Roberts KBE CMG CVO (8 August 1924 – 7 June 1987) was a British diplomat who held several senior overseas posts during the latter half of the 20th century. Over the course of his career in the Diplomatic Service, he served as British ambassador to Lebanon, Syria, and the United Arab Emirates, and was High Commissioner to both Barbados and Sierra Leone. He was appointed KBE, CMG, and CVO.

== Career ==
David Roberts was educated at Hereford Cathedral School and Jesus College, Oxford. After wartime service in the Royal Armoured Corps he joined the Diplomatic Service in 1947. He served in Baghdad, Tokyo, Alexandria, Khartoum, Dakar, Damascus and Dubai, with some intervening posts in London, before being appointed High Commissioner to Barbados in 1971. Roberts was Ambassador to Syria 1973–76; High Commissioner to Sierra Leone 1976–77; Ambassador to the United Arab Emirates 1977–81; and Ambassador to Lebanon 1981–83. He was knighted in the New Year Honours in 1983 and was director-general of the Middle East Association 1983–85. In 1985 he was appointed an Honorary Fellow of the Centre for Middle Eastern and Islamic Studies at Durham University.

Sir David was chairman of Herefordshire District Health Authority from 1986 until his death.

== Publications ==
- The Ba'th and the Creation of Modern Syria, Palgrave, 1987. ISBN 0-312-06948-0

== Sources ==
ROBERTS,Sir David (Arthur), Who Was Who, A & C Black, 1920–2008; online edn, Oxford University Press, Dec 2007, accessed 14 Feb 2012

Diplomatic posts
Preceded by John S. Bennett	British High Commissioner to Barbados; 1971–1973	Succeeded by Charles Stuart Roberts
