= Janet Douglas (diplomat) =

British diplomat (born 1960)

Her Excellency Janet Douglas CMG
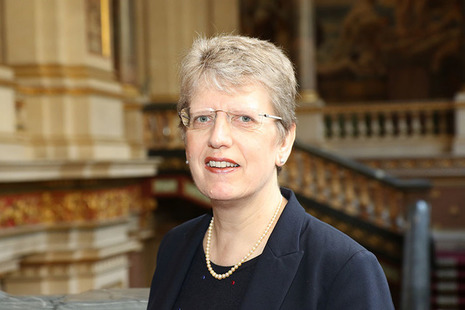

British High Commissioner to Barbados and the East Caribbean
- In office April 2017 – December 2020
- Monarch: Elizabeth II
- Prime Minister: Theresa May; Boris Johnson
- Preceded by: Victoria Dean
- Succeeded by: Scott Furssedonn-Wood

Personal details
- Born: Janet Elizabeth Douglas; 1960 (age 65–66)
- Spouse: Tony Furlong
- Children: Two step children
- Education: St Catharine's College, Cambridge
- Occupation: Diplomat

Janet Elizabeth Douglas CMG (born 1960) is a retired British diplomat who was the British High Commissioner to Barbados and the East Caribbean from 2017 to 2020.

== Consular career ==
Douglas joined the Foreign and Commonwealth Office (FCO) in 1985 and was first made Desk Officer for Greece. In 1986, she was moved to the Directorate General of the European Commission. From 1987 to 1988, Douglas underwent Turkish training before being posted to the embassy in Ankara.

In 1991, she was made the Head of the Humanitarian Affairs Section and later joined the Emergency Aid Policy and Emergency Preparedness unit of the FCO. In 1996, Douglas was made the First Secretary of the European Union office in Stockholm and in 2000, the Deputy Department head of the Southern Africa Directorate at the FCO.

From 2002 to 2004, Douglas headed various internal bodies at the FCO and 2004 became the head of the Consular Assistance Group. She was appointed Companion of the Order of St Michael and St George in recognition of her work in the role in the 2008 New Year's Honours list.

From 2011 to 2017, Douglas was the Deputy Head of Mission in Ankara until she was appointed British High Commissioner to Barbados and the East Caribbean in April 2017. Douglas retired from the Diplomatic Service in December 2020, being succeeded by Scott Furssedonn-Wood in April 2021.

== Personal life ==
She was a pupil at Cheltenham Ladies College and later studied Archaeology and Anthropology at St Catharine's College, Cambridge. Douglas is married to Tony Furlong and has two step children. She can speak French, Swedish and Turkish.

Diplomatic posts
Preceded by Victoria Dean	British High Commissioner to Barbados and the East Caribbean; 2017–2020	Succeeded by Scott Furssedonn-Wood
