= Milica Krstić =

Serbian architect (1887–1964)

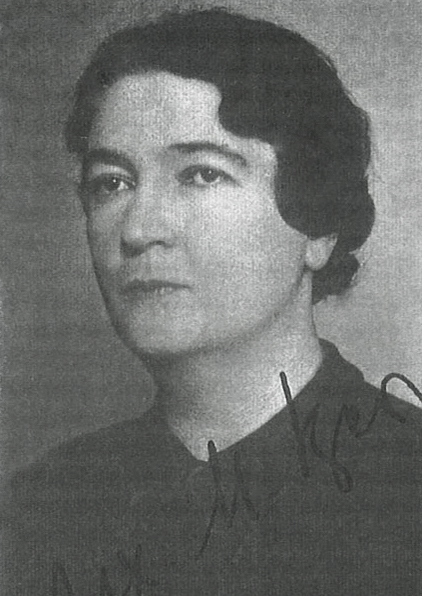
- Milica Čolak-Antić Krstić
- Born: Milica Čolak-Antić; 9 September 1887; Kragujevac, Kingdom of Serbia
- Died: 9 September 1964 (aged 77); Belgrade, Yugoslavia
- Education: University of Belgrade
- Occupation: Architect
- Parent: Milivoje Čolak-Antić (brother)
- Relatives: Čolak-Anta Simeonović
- Awards: St. Sava Order GO, (1928); St. Sava Order GC, (1935); Yugoslav Crown (1939)
- Buildings: Command of Gendarmerie; Second Gymnasium for Girls; First Gymnasium for Boys

Milica Čolak-Antić Krstić (Serbian Cyrillic: Милица Чолак-Антић Крстић; 9 September 1887 – 9 September 1964) was a Serbian architect, she is considered one of the most important female architects in Serbia and Yugoslavia during the first half of the twenty-first century. She spent her twenty-six-year career employed by the State, at a time when women could only be public employees, working for the ministry of civil engineering.

Krstić's career flourished in the period between the two wars, influenced mostly by Modernism. In 1940, as a respected architect, she reached the rank of inspector, the highest position and received numerous awards for her achievements.

== Early life and training ==
Milica Čolak-Antić was born on 9 September 1887 in Kragujevac, in central Serbia. A member of the Čolak-Antić family, her father Paul was a Cavalry office, son of Duke Čolak-Anta Simeonović, a famed military commander of the First Serbian Uprising; Her mother Jelena was the sister of painter Milan Milovanović. She had two brothers Antonije (1890-1908) a composer and Milivoje Čolak-Antić (1884-1944) a colonel in the army. After graduating from Belgrade's Gymnasium for Girls in 1906, she studied architecture at the University of Belgrade, she graduated in 1910. She married Žarko Krstić, also an architect, while at University.

== Architecture career ==
=== Early career: 1915 to 1931 ===
In 1915 Milica Krstić started her career in the architectural department of the Ministry of Construction. The architectural department was back then the largest architectural practice in the country. Her colleagues were Momir Korunović, Nikolaj Krasnov, Vasilij Androsov, Branislav Kojić, and others. She started as a subarchitect to architect. The country was in cruel need of rebuilding after years of wars and foreign occupation, from 1915 to 1918 Belgrade was in the zone of Serbia under harsh Austro-Hungarian occupation, during the fighting preceding the invasion Belgrade alone lost 25% of its buildings.

Like most women in architecture during those years, Krstić was assigned educational architecture. The challenges was to design, on a low budget, a healthy, functional, and well-designed environment, for students and teachers. She designed Elementary Schools for small villages around Serbia incorporating elements of local traditional architecture: Godacica (1923), Slatina (1924), Dugo Polje (1924), Gornji Matejevac (1925), Salaš Crnobarski (1926) and Viničko (1928) before moving to monumental buildings in Belgrade. Her vision developed within the style and spirit of local building traditions.

Her first monumental building was the Command of Gendarmerie in 1931 at 14 Saint Sava street in Belgrade, the Gendarmerie of the Kingdom of Yugoslavia, today the building of Komercijalna Bank. It shows her commitment to a functionalist approach. Her most praised buildings are two monumental schools in Belgrade.

=== Later career: 1933 to 1941 ===
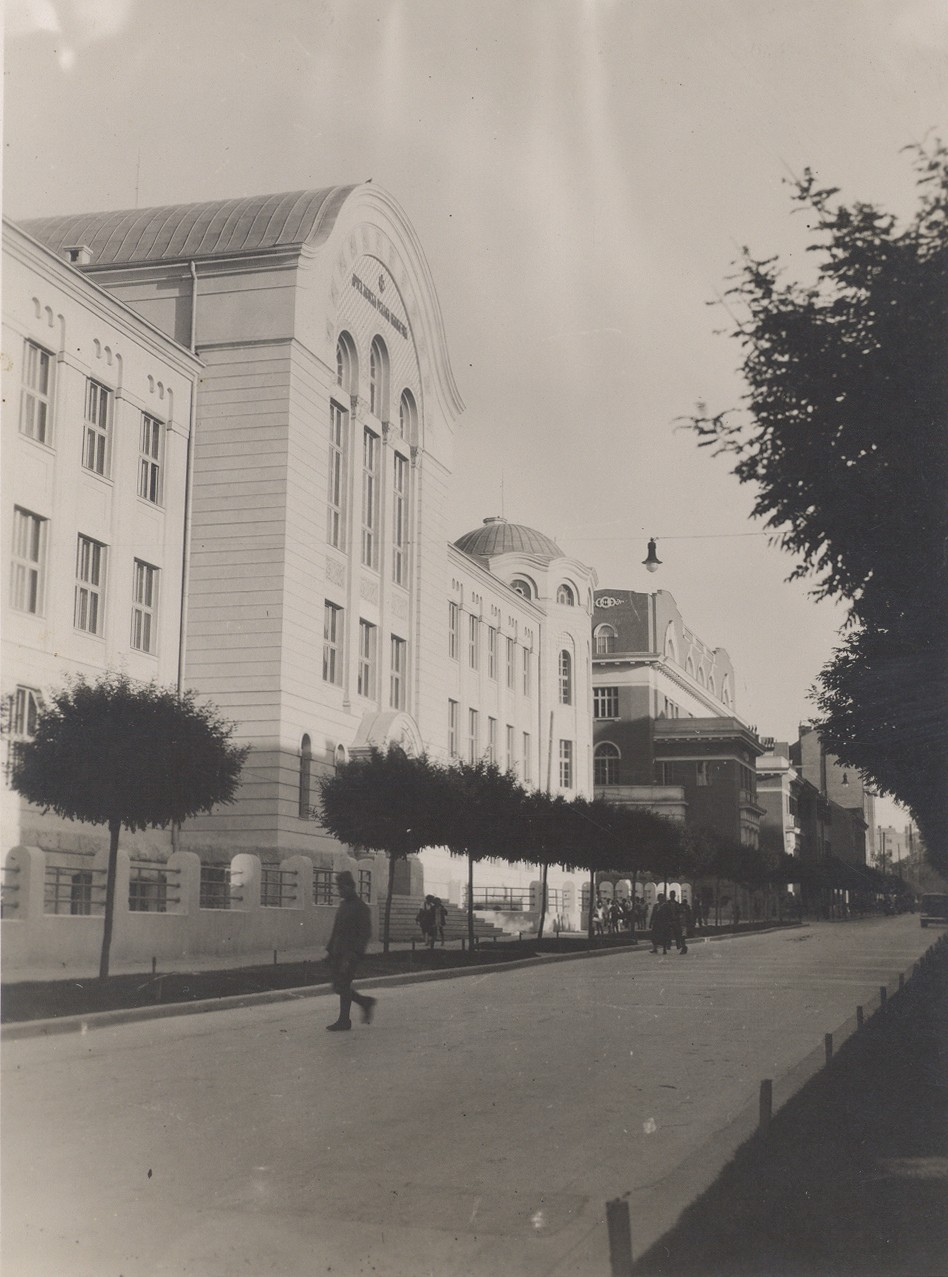
The Second Gymnasium for Girls, designed by Milica Krstić in 1932 in Belgrade (today Electro-technical high school Nikola Tesla).

In 1933 she designed the Second Gymnasium for Girls, the same school that she attended as a young girl, at 31 Queen Natalia street, (Note: after the Second World War the street was renamed Narodnog fronta street) today the Electro-technical Gymnasium Nikola Tesla, it was constructed in place of the Girls College and the building of the State Council. She created a sumptuous building simple in modern Serbian-Byzantine style or neo-Byzantine. The Second Gymnasium for Girls was designed without unnecessary decoration, the white facade and the rounded corners clearly show the influence of modernism and Milica Krstić's application of the principles of Bauhaus and Modernism. The building has been declared a cultural heritage in 1964.

In 1936 she designed the First Gymnasium for Boys at 65 Dušanova street. In contrast to her previous building she went for a more bare modern style. In 1989, The First Gymnasium for Boys was also declared a cultural heritage. In 1938 she was promoted head of the Department for public buildings and in 1940 she reached the highest position of inspector in the Ministry of Civil Engineering.

Krstić also designed the embassies of the Kingdom of Yugoslavia in Buenos Aires and Ankara, where she stayed for some time, in 1941 she retired from state service. After the Second World War she would never work as an architect again, changes in Yugoslavia's political and economic situation meant that pre-war architects were excluded by the communist authorities from post-war artistic production.

== Personal life and legacy ==
Milica Čolak-Antić Krstić lived at 7 Silvija Kranjčevića Street, in a house that she and her husband designed and built in 1937. She spoke French, Spanish, English, and German. Throughout her life, she was active in various associations sharing and exchanging with her colleagues about ways to improve the living conditions of people. She volunteered to help those in need through the work of the Circle of Serbian Sisters, she fought for peace and against the trafficking of women and children within the Yugoslav League of Women for Peace and Freedom. She was also an active spokesperson for female equality in particular in the field of architecture. Her work has been recognized with prestigious awards from both Serbia and Yugoslavia.

Žarko died in April 1941, Milica died at her home in Belgrade on 9 September 1964.
