= Gostinica =

Coordinates: 43°54′52″N 19°51′01″E

- Village
- Interactive map of Gostinica
- Country: Serbia
- Time zone: UTC+1 (CET)
  - Summer (DST): UTC+2 (CEST)

Gostinica (Serbian Cyrillic: Гостиница) is a village located in the Užice municipality of Serbia. According to the 2002 census, the village has a population of 639.
