= Hallam Henry =

Barbadian politician and diplomat

Hallam Henry is a Barbadian politician and diplomat. He is the Barbadian ambassador to China.
