= Jacques-Henry Heuls =

French diplomat

Jacques-Henry Heuls is a French diplomat. He is a permanent diplomat in the Ministry of Europe and Foreign Affairs of France. He had previously served as the French Ambassador to the Eastern Caribbean States, Barbados and the OECS. He served as French ambassador from 2020 till 2022. In 2013, he served as the French ambassador to Uzbekistan till 2016.
