= Milan Milovanović (painter) =

Serbian painter

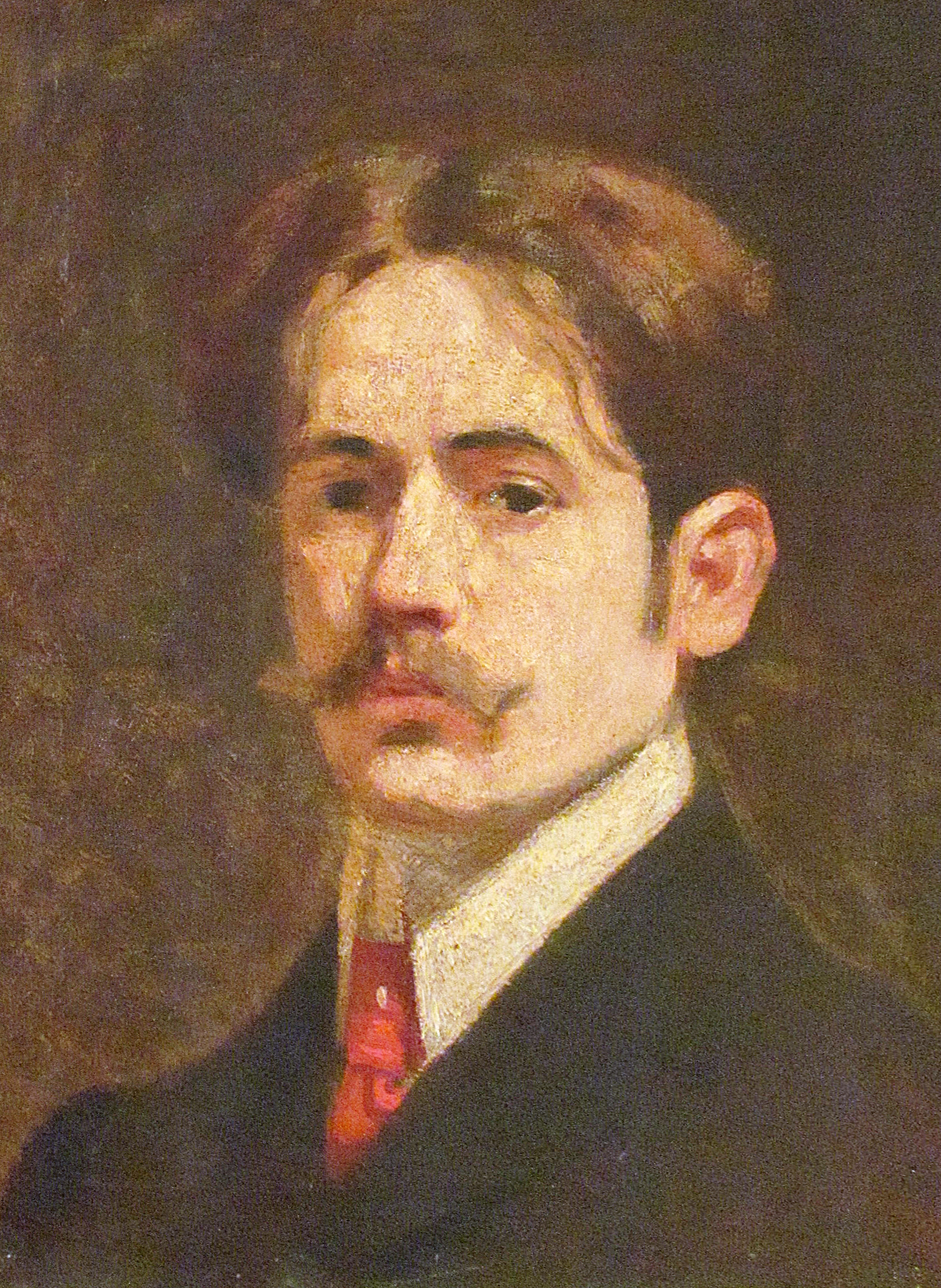
Self-portrait (1907)

Milan Milovanović (Cyrillic: Милан Миловановић; 19 October 1876 – 15 August 1946) was a Serbian Impressionist painter and art teacher.

== Biography ==
After finishing his secondary education in 1896, he enrolled at the art school operated by Kiril Kutlík in Belgrade. The following year, he began taking lessons with Anton Ažbe in Munich and, shortly after, enrolled at the Academy of Fine Arts where he initially studied with Karl Raupp, then Ludwig von Herterich and Carl von Marr. After graduating in 1902, he spent four years studying and working in Paris, beginning at the Académie Colarossi, then at the École nationale supérieure des Beaux-Arts, where he worked with Léon Bonnat and Luc-Olivier Merson.

Upon returning to Belgrade, he received a commission from the Ministry of Foreign Affairs to study Orthodox monasteries in Serbia, Macedonia and Mount Athos. In 1904 in Kragujevac, he also assisted Živko Jugović. His art in those areas inspired him to paint works with much light, mostly depicting architecture in natural settings. His painting of the Stone Bridge in Skopje is one of the first examples of Serbian Impressionism.

During World War I, he served in the Royal Serbian Army; painting mostly scenes with soldiers and portraits of officers. After a serious illness in 1915, he was sent to Italy for recovery and resumed his usual themes. During that period, and immediately after, he lived in Rome, Southern France and Dubrovnik.

From 1908 until 1933, he was an occasional teacher at the Royal Art School in Belgrade. His output of paintings decreased dramatically after 1920, but he did restorative work on frescoes and wrote some occasional art criticism.

He was married to Olga Mišić (1886–1977), the daughter of Field Marshal Živojin Mišić. He is the maternal uncle of architect Milica Čolak-Antić Krstić.

== Selected paintings ==
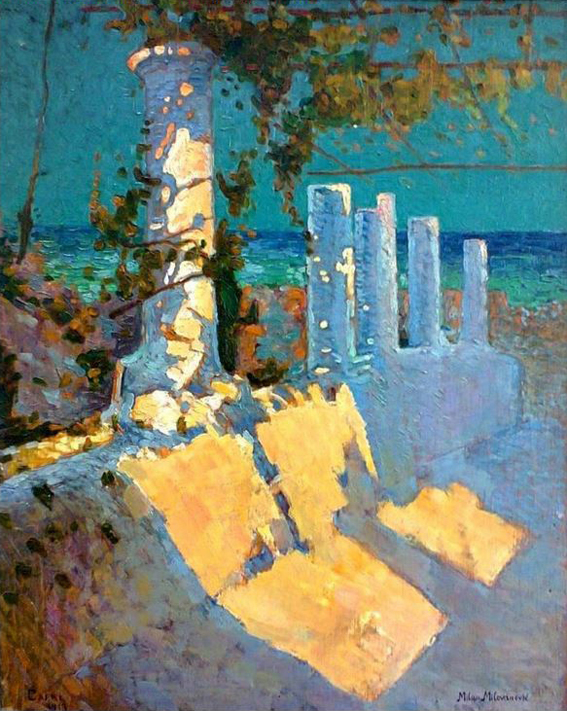
Terrace in the Sunlight

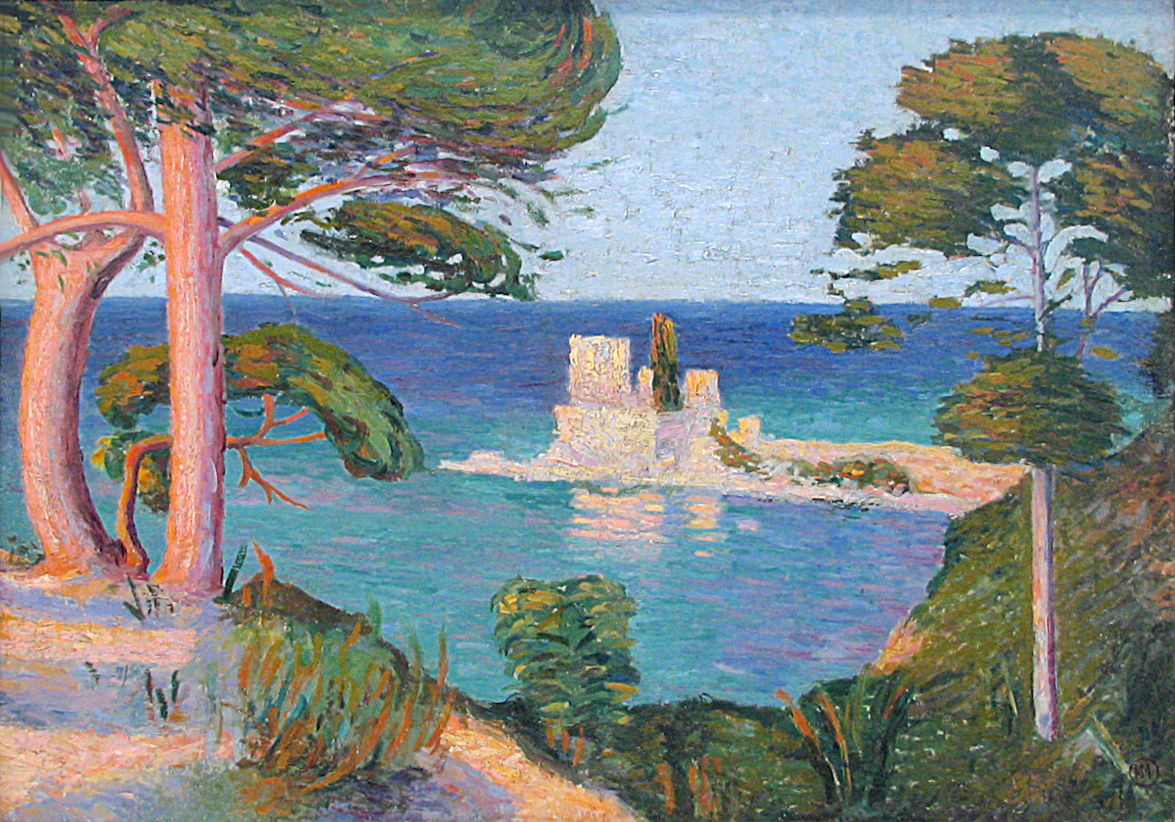
On the Coast by Hilandar

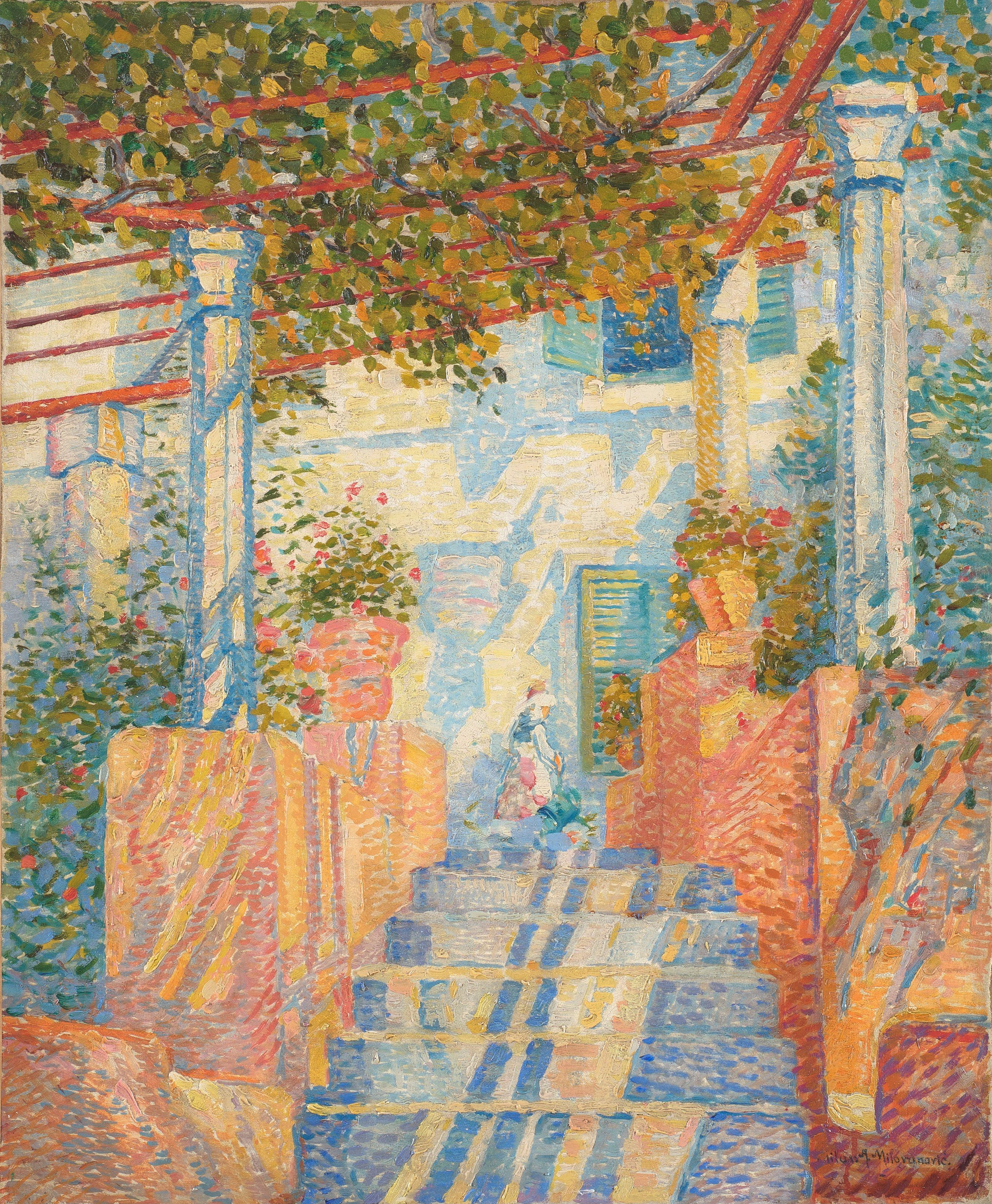
Red Terrace

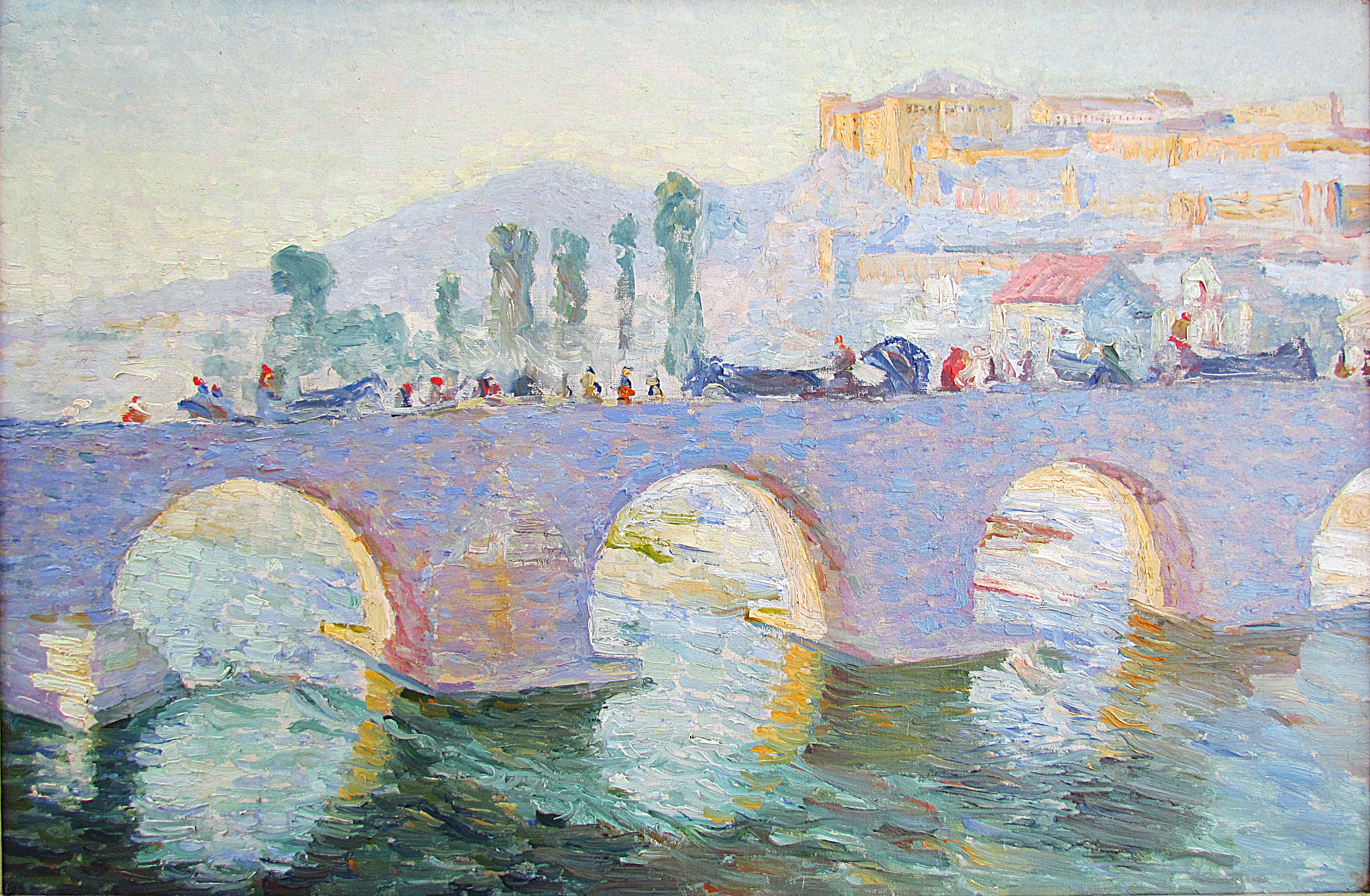
Stone Bridge, Skopje

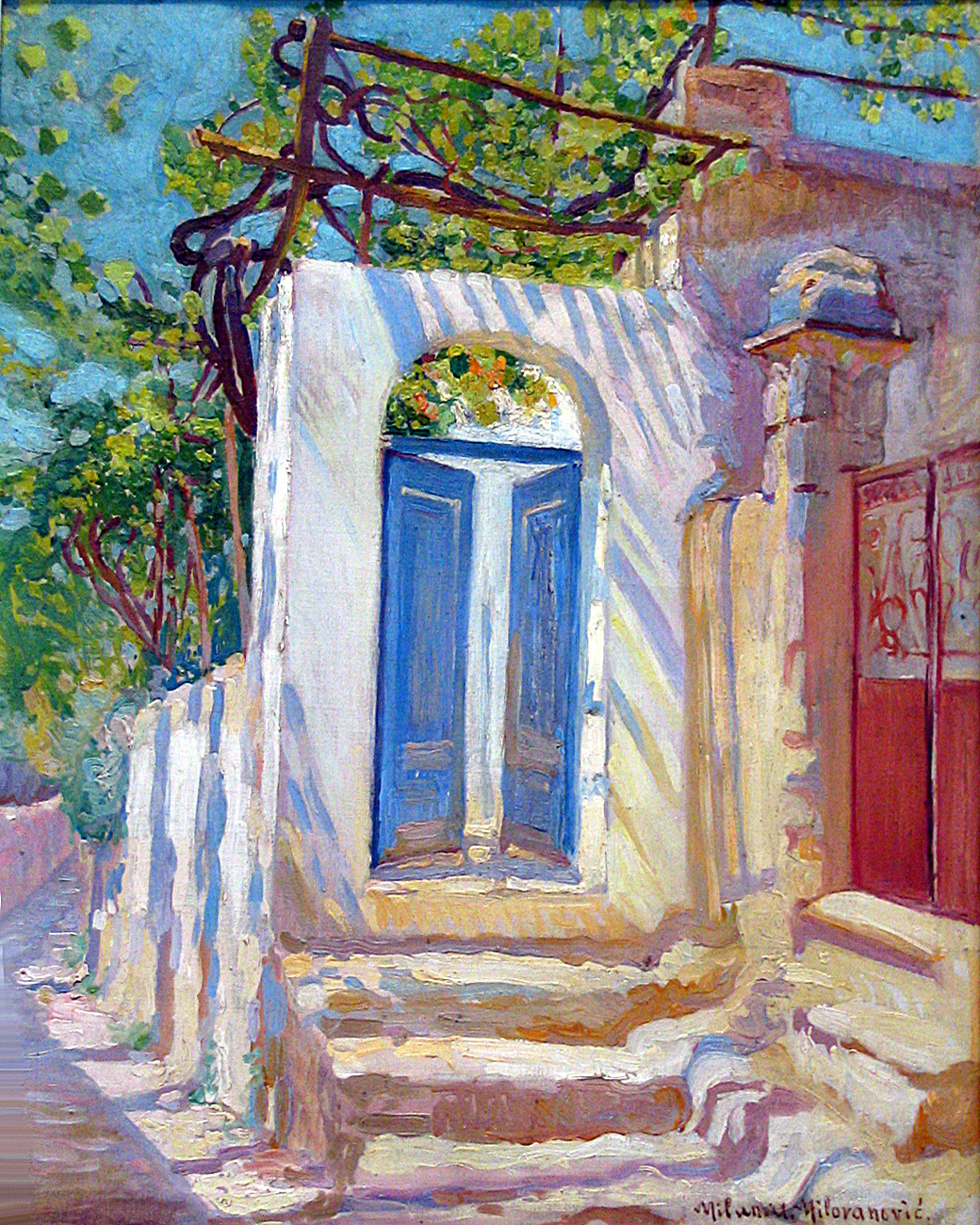
Blue Door

== See also ==
- Mihailo Milovanović
- List of painters from Serbia
- War artist
