= List of settlements in the Federation of Bosnia and Herzegovina/NJ =

List of settlements in the Federation of Bosnia and Herzegovina - NJ
| Settlement | City or municipality | Canton |
|---|---|---|
| Njeganovići | Bileća | |
| Njemanica | Stari Grad, Sarajevo | |
| Njivak | Gradačac | |
| Njuhe | Foča | |
