= Radoslav Bratić =

Serbian writer

Radoslav Bratić (28 June 1948 in Brestice, near Bileća, Bosnia-Herzegovina – 2 June 2016 in Belgrade, Serbia) was a Serbian writer, playwright and editor. He was also a corresponding member Academy of Sciences and Arts of Republika Srpska.

== Biography ==
Radoslav Bratić finished primary school in Korita (near Bileća) and in Bileća, high school in Trebinje, and studied Yugoslav and world literature at the Faculty of Philology in Belgrade. He was the editor of the student magazine Znak, the magazine Književnost, the newspaper Književna reč, and the editor-in-chief of the magazine Relasion.

He worked as a secretary and vice-president of the Association of Writers of Serbia, then as an editor in the publishing house "BIGZ", where he edited a dozen libraries. Among other books, he edited the collected works Slobodan Jovanović, Danilo Kiš, a set of books Borislav Pekić, as well as the edition "New Books of Domestic Writers". He started the famous library "Conversations with Writers" and published several books in it. He also prepared the book Prayers and Petitions of His Holiness the Serbian Patriarch Pavle.

Bratić made several selections in literature and edited several thematic blocks in newspapers and magazines, including literature China, India, Lusatian Serbs, and American blacks.

His short stories have been included in several anthologies and anthologies in Yugoslavia and around the world, and have been translated into English, Hindi, German, Swedish, Polish, Czech, French, Chinese, Romanian, Russian and Italian. Bratic travelled to all these places and established cooperation with important people. As a result of this collaboration, a number of works in English, Hindi, and other languages were created.

He was elected a corresponding member ANURS outside the staff on 4 December 2015.

He has also written several plays for radio and television. Alone or with associates, he prepared several anthologies of texts from foreign literature (Sorbian Serbs, Chinese, Indian, American blacks). As an editor at BIGZ, he edited a dozen libraries of domestic and foreign literature.

He has received numerous important awards: Mladost List, Isidora Sekulić Award, Andrić Prize, Ćamil Sijarić Award, Meša Selimović Award, Borbina Award, Petar Kočić Award 1999, Miloš Crnjanski Plaque, Golden Charter of Tsar Dušan, Svetozar Ćorović and others.

He lived and worked in Belgrade. He died on 2 June 2016 in the settlement Kumodraž, in Belgrade in his apartment after a long and severe illness. He was buried in Alley of the Greats at the Belgrade New Cemetery.

== Novels ==
- Smrt spasitelja [Death of the Savior]. Belgrade: Narodna knjiga Alfa. 2003. ISBN 86-331-0868-2. OCLC 61315871.
- Sumnja u biografiju [Doubt in the biography]. Belgrade: Prosveta. 1980. OCLC 8284701.
- Trg soli. Belgrade: Narodna knjiga : Alfa. 2002. ISBN 978-86-331-0731-0. OCLC 978229605.
- Seherezadin ljubavnik. Višnjić. 2012. ISBN 978-86-07-01949-6. OCLC 1014999308.
- Slika bez oca. Belgrade: Prosveta. 1986. ISBN 978-86-07-00111-8. OCLC 26705189.
- Strah od zvona. Belgrade: Prosveta: Filip Višnjić. 1992. ISBN 978-86-07-01948-9. OCLC 981596782.
- Najlepše priče Radoslava Bratića. Belgrade: Prosveta. 2003. OCLC 652112534.
