= Meka =

Meka can refer to:

== People ==
- Meka (given name), unisex given name
- Meka (surname)
- Meka (singer), member of the American hip-hop collective Flipmode Squad from 1997 to 2003

== Other uses ==
- Meka, Arunachal Pradesh, a village in Arunachal Pradesh, India
- Meka language, Bantu language of Cameroon
- Meka Robotics, former San Francisco-based robotics company acquired by Google
- Meka Station, pastoral lease in Western Australia, Australia

== See also ==
- FN Meka, fictional rapper
- Meka Gruda (disambiguation)
- Mecha (disambiguation)
