= Andrija Luburić =

Serbian historian

- Андрија Лубурић
- Born: 16 November 1891; Nikšić, Principality of Montenegro
- Died: 19 March 1944 (aged 52)
- Occupations: Historian, folklorist

Andrija Luburić (16 November 1891 – 19 March 1944) was a Serbian historian and collector of folk songs. He is remembered as one of three major Serbian folklorists of the early 20th century along with Nikola T. Kašiković and Novica Šaulić.

== Biography ==
Andrija Luburić was born on 16 November 1891 in Nikšić. Mirko Radoičić mentions his father, Mrdak Luburić from Rioca near Bileće as a prominent participant Herzegovina uprising of 1875–1878), and Stanislav Vinaver and as a "famous guslar".

Very early, in 1910, at the urging of Jovan Erdeljanović, Luburić began collecting folk songs and various materials for studying the settlements and the origins of the population Old Hercegovina (Nikšić, Drobnjak, Piva, Golija, Bijela Rudina and Morača). In August 1913, he met Jovan Cvijić, who gave him instructions for furthering his work. However, this work was interrupted the following year by World War I.

After the war, Andrija taught in two villages in Nikšić: Brezovik and Dragovoljići in 1919, then worked as a police clerk in his hometown in 1920. Then and during the twenties, he systematically collected folk songs.

From 1927, Luburić lived in Belgrade, where he was mainly engaged in scientific and literary work.

At the end of 1928, with linguist Gerhard Geseman (1888–1948), guslar Tanasije Vućić, Andrija, through Zagreb and Prague, he travelled to Berlin for recording Vučić's repertoire on gold records. The folklorist Radosav Medenica (1897–1994) wrote quite extensively about this journey.

Although he spent more than twenty years collecting folk epic songs (800-plus), Luburić did a lot in the scientific field as well. He left behind five books: Drobnjaci - a Serbian tribe in Herzegovina and Montenegro (1930), Orlovići and their role in the Montenegrin Christmas Eve 1710 (1934), Capitulation of Montenegro: documents, vol. I (1938), The Origin and Past of the Dynasty Petrović-Njegoš (1940) and The Capitulation of Montenegro: Documents, Vol. II (1940).

He died in Belgrade on 19 March 1944.
