= Kašiković =

Kašiković (Serbian Cyrillic: Кашиковић) is a Serbian surname.

Notable people with the surname include:

- Nikola T. Kašiković (1861–1927), Serbian writer and educator
- Stoja Kašiković (1865 – after 1927), Serbian feminist, editor and teacher
- Dragiša Kašiković (1932–1977), Serbian writer and journalist
