= Slavko Aleksić =

Bosnian Serb Chetnik commander (1956–2025)

- Born: 1 September 1956; Bogdašići, PR Bosnia and Herzegovina, Yugoslavia
- Died: 18 December 2025 (aged 69); Trebinje, Bosnia and Herzegovina
- Military career
- Allegiance: Republika Srpska
- Branch: Army of Republika Srpska
- Service years: 1992–1996
- Rank: Vojvoda
- Unit: New Sarajevo Chetnik Detachment
- Conflicts: Bosnian War

Slavko Aleksić (Serbian Cyrillic: Славко Алексић; 1 September 1956 – 18 December 2025) was a Bosnian Serb Chetnik commander (vojvoda) who commanded the New Sarajevo Chetnik Detachment of the Army of Republika Srpska during the Bosnian War.

== Life and career ==
Aleksić was born on 1 September 1956 in Bogdašići, near the Herzegovinian town of Bileća. He spent most of his life in Sarajevo, where he studied law and later worked in a post office.

He was one of the founders of the Chetnik movement in Sarajevo in 1990. Since 1990, Aleksić has been a member of the Serbian Radical Party led by Vojislav Šešelj. After the Bosnian Independence referendum on 1 March 1992 and the start of the Bosnian War, he became the commander of the New Sarajevo Chetnik Detachment of the Army of Republika Srpska based in Grbavica. He was appointed vojvoda by Vojislav Šeselj on 13 May 1993 and by Momčilo Đujić on 27 January 1999. He distinguished himself in the battles around Grbavica, and was wounded three times. Among other things, with the New Sarajevo Chetnik Detachment, he held Serb positions at the Old Jewish Cemetery, where the fiercest fighting took place at the demarcation line between Istočno Sarajevo and Sarajevo and between the Army of Republika Srpska and Army of the Republic of Bosnia and Herzegovina. After the Operation Deliberate Force in 1995, and after the signing of the Dayton Agreement, in March 1996, he led the withdrawal of the Army of Republika Srpska and Serbs from Grbavica.

After the war he settled in the woods around Bileća and was an active member of the Ravna Gora movement of Republika Srpska.

The Court of Bosnia and Herzegovina sentenced Aleksić and two other members of the Ravna Gora movement—Dušan Sladojević and Risto Lečić—to five months in prison each for inciting national, racial, and religious hatred, discord, and intolerance in Višegrad in March 2019. The verdict was delivered in 2022, and the prison sentences were later commuted to fines amounting to 15,000 KM (approximately €7,670).

Aleksić died on 18 December 2025, at the age of 69.
