= Vladan Matijević =

Serbian writer and poet (born 1962)

Vladan Matijević (Serbian-Cyrillic: Владан Матијевић; born 16 November 1962 in Čačak, SFR Yugoslavia) is a Serbian writer. He worked for eighteen years as an engineer in Pančevo's chemical base factory before completing his university education, graduating in Philosophy. Since 2005, he has been director of Nadežda Petrović Gallery in his native town, where he lives with his two daughters. He is a widower, his deceased wife Sonja's grandmother was Combat Veteran of Partizan Brigade in Bor, who saved the life of her later husband Imre Tiszmer.

== Life and work ==
Matijević is a multiple laureate of Serbian literary awards. He said in interview that he tries to write as little as possible. Nevertheless, he has created a considerable body of literary work. His most successful novel Moments of Joy has been published in French, Spanish, German, Italian, Russian, and Macedonian. In 2009, he took part in the New Literature from Serbia event organised by the Austrian literary society Podium, where he read from Moments of Joy on the stage at the Viennese coffee house Prückel. The passage was subsequently read by an actress in German. In 2011, a collection of four short stories was published as a multilingual edition in Albanian, Hungarian, Bulgarian and Romanian. In the same year, he participated in the Salon international du livre de Québec, the Leipzig Book Fair, and the multinational cultural program Literature in Flux, organized by the HALMA Network and the International Canetti Society. There were readings on board ships in the harbours of European cities along the Danube, he read in Ruse, Cetate, Belgrade, Novi Sad and Budapest. Matijević was a Serbian representative at the European Literature Nights 2013 in Paris. In 2014, an English edition of his novel Very Little Light was published. In 2016, a half-hour conversation between Matijević and the writer Aleksandar Gatalica was broadcast by RTS as part of the program series Književni dijalog (Literary Dialogue). He participated in the Beijing International Book Fair 2017. In June 2018, he was invited by the Andrić Institute to Andrićgrad, where he talked about his work in a public discussion and answered questions from the audience.

In an interview with Gloria magazine, the writer was to associate each letter of the alphabet with an aphorism; some examples follow:

- B - Belgrade: A city where I have experienced many delightful moments.
- E - European Union: We have been taking big steps for decades, and we have not come closer for a millimeter. Maybe it is a Serbian Fata Morgana.
- G - Gandhi: prevailed without violence against the Empire and liberated the country. A fact that sounds like a myth.
- H - Harem: after the liberation from the Ottoman Turks, some of our Vojvodes tried to preserve this wonderful oriental institution but were destroyed by European influence and premature Serbian emancipation.
- P - Process: the best prose work of the Twentieth century.
- V - Vatre: the first masterpiece of Marguerite Yourcenar. She wrote it to overcome her unhappy love.

On advertising, Matijević said:

Since the second half of the 20th century, there are graduate marketing professionals in all areas of life. Advertising has become the greatest need of each person, it does not know any toothpaste to use, nor any food to eat, nor in what bed it wants to sleep until it is explained to the person by an advertising expert. I notice that today it is especially important that is something inexpensive. And that's why everything became cheap. Such are our lives as well. Soon they will also go on sale. With the emergence of the internet, the phenomenon of advertising has reached its peak.

== Bibliography (selection) ==
- Ne remeteći rasulo (Don't Disturb the Chaos), poetry, Dom omladine, Zaječar 1991.
- Van kontrole (Out of Control), novel, Dečje novine, Gornji Milanovac 1995.
- R. C. neminovno (R. C. Unavoidably), novel, Rad, Belgrade 1997, ISBN 86-09-00472-4.
- Samosvođenje (Self-reduction), poetry, Multigraf, Čačak 1999.
- Prilično mrtvi (Pretty Dead), short stories, Narodna knjiga–Alfa, Belgrade 2000.
- Pisac izdaleka (Writer from Afar), novel, Narodna knjiga–Alfa, Belgrade 2003, ISBN 86-331-1017-2.
- Časovi radosti (Moments of Joy), novel, Narodna knjiga–Alfa, Belgrade 2006, ISBN 86-331-2867-5.
- Žilavi komadi (Tough Plays), dramas, Gradac K, Čačak 2009, ISBN 978-86-83507-64-1.
- Vrlo malo svetlosti (Very Little Light), novel, Agora, Zrenjanin 2010, ISBN 978-86-6053-058-7.
- Memoari, amnezije : eseji, besede, beleške (Memoirs, Amnesias: Essays, Words, Notes), Službeni glasnik, Belgrade 2012, ISBN 978-86-519-1288-0.
- Pristaništa (Ports), short stories, Agora, Zrenjanin 2014, ISBN 978-86-6053-130-0.
- Susret pod neobičnim okolnostima (Meeting Under Unusual Circumstances), novel, Laguna, Belgrade 2016, ISBN 978-86-521-2264-6.
- Sloboda govora (Freedom Of Speech), novel, Laguna, Belgrade 2020, ISBN 978-86-521-3754-1.

English editions

- Very Little Light, Geopoetika Publishing, Belgrade 2014, ISBN 978-86-6145-184-3.
- The Quite Dead, Kontrast, Belgrade 2020, ISBN 978-86-6036-074-0.

French editions

- Les aventures de Minette Accentiévitch (Moments of Joy), Les Allusifs, Montreal 2007 and 2009, ISBN 978-2-9228-6858-6.
- Les aventures de Minette Accentiévitch, Éditions Points, Paris 2008 and 2009, ISBN 978-2-7578-0832-0.
- Le baisespoir du jeune Arnold (Out of Control), Les Allusifs, Montreal 2009, ISBN 978-2-922868-87-6.
- Un rien de lumière (Very Little Light), Les Éditions Noir Sur Blanc, Paris and Lausanne 2019, ISBN 978-2-88250-547-7.

== Awards ==
- Milutin Uskoković Award 1999 for the short story Proleće Filipa Kukavice
- Andrić Award 2000 for Prilično mrtvi.
- NIN Award 2003 for Pisac izdaleka.
- Awards Zlatni Hit liber (Golden Hit liber) and Zlatni bestseler (Golden bestseller) 2004 for Pisac izdaleka
- Meša Selimović Award 2010 for Vrlo malo svetlosti
- Borisav Stanković Award 2010 for Vrlo malo svetlosti
- Isidora Sekulić Award 2010 for Vrlo malo svetlosti
- Awards Kočićevo pero and Kočićeva knjiga 2012 for Memoari, amnezije : eseji, besede, beleške
- Stevan Sremac Award and Danko Popović Award 2014 for Pristaništa
- Ramonda Serbika Award 2019 of Književna kolonija „Sićevo“for his entire contribution to Serbian literature
