= Davidovici =

Davidovici may refer to:

== People ==
- Doru Davidovici (1945–1989), Romanian aviator and writer
- Natalia Davidovici, (born 1971), Moldovan politician and journalist
- Robert Davidovici, Romanian violinist

== Places ==
- Donji Davidovići, village in the municipality of Bileća, Bosnia and Herzegovina
- Gornji Davidovići, village in the municipality of Bileća, Bosnia and Herzegovina
