= Andrić Prize =

Annual literally award for short stories

- Andrićeva nagrada
- Awarded for: best short story or short story collection
- Date: 10 October
- Location: Belgrade
- Country: Serbia
- Presented by: Zadužbina Ive Andrića ("Ivo Andrić Foundation")
- First award: 1975

The Andrić Prize (Serbian: Андрићева награда, romanized: Andrićeva nagrada) is a Serbian and formerly Yugoslav annual literary award for short stories and short story collections written in Serbian, granted by the Zadužbina Ive Andrića ("Ivo Andrić Foundation") since 1975.

== History ==
The prize was founded by the Ivo Andrić Foundation in accordance with the last will of Yugoslav Nobel laureate Ivo Andrić. The formal foundation took place on 12 March 1976, and the rules for granting the prize were amended in 2005, 2006, 2019 and 2020. Three jurors decide on the winner. The jurors themselves are elected by a board of literary authors, critics and historians to a mandate of 3 years. The prize consists of a diploma and a sum of money. It is given to the winner at a ceremony held every year on October 10, the birth date of Ivo Andrić.

For the year 2010, no work was awarded for the first time in the prize's history. According to the jurors' statement, none of the authors nominated that year deserved the prize, although "some quality works were nominated".

== Recipients ==
The following is a list of recipients of the Andrić Prize for each year.

Year	Author	Work
1975	Dragoslav Mihailović	Petrijin venac
1976	Antonije Isaković	Tren
1977	Milisav Savić	Ujak naše varoši
1978	Aleksandar Tišma	Škola bezbožništva
1979	Mirko Kovač	Slike iz porodičnog albuma Meštrevića
1980	Ćamil Sijarić	Francuski pamuk
1981	Svetlana Velmar Janković	Dorćol
1982	David Albahari	Opis smrti
1983	Danilo Kiš	Enciklopedija mrtvih
1984	Vidosav Stevanović	Carski rez
1985	Radoslav Bratić	Slike bez oca
1986	Mladen Markov	Starci na selu
1987	Filip David	Princ vatre
1988	Jovan Radulović	Dalje od oltara
1989	Radoslav Petković	Izveštaj o kugi
1990	Saša Hadži Tančić	Zvezdano povezani
1991	Milica Mićić Dimovska	Odmrzavanje
1992	Voja Čolanović	Prirodan odgovor
1993	Živojin Pavlović	Tavan
1994	Vida Ognjenović	Otrovno mleko maslačka
1995	Pavle Ugrinov	Nikoleta
1996	Radovan Beli Marković	Setembrini u Kolubari
1997	Danilo Nikolić	Ulazak u svet
1998	Miroslav Josić Višnjić	Novi godovi
1999	Aleksandar Gatalica	Vek
2000	Vladan Matijević	Prilično mrtvi
2001	Milorad Pavić	Priče sa savske padine (short story cycle, published in the book Strasne ljubavne priče)
2002	Miroslav Toholj	Mala Azija i priče o bolu
2003	Mihajlo Pantić	Ako je to ljubav
2004	Jovica Aćin	Dnevnik o vagini
2005	Ljubica Arsić	Maco, da l' me voliš?
2006	Goran Petrović	Razlike
2007	Ljiljana Dugalić	Akt
2008	Mirko Demić	Molski akordi
2009	Milenko Pajić	Dokumentarne priče (short story cycle published in Imam jednu priču za tebe)
2010	No recipients	
2011	Milovan Marčetić	Izlazak
2012	Mirjana Pavlović	Trpeza bez glavnog jela
2013	Drago Kekanović	Usvojenje
2014	Uglješa Šajtinac	Banatorijum
2015	Vule Žurić	Tajna crvenog zamka
2016	Jelena Lengold	Raščarani svet
2017	Vladimir Кecmanović	Ratne igre
2018	Dragan Stojanović	Ćerka španskog borca
2019	Anđelko Anušić	Legenda o v/j/etrom vijanima
2020	Dejan Stojiljković	Neonski bluz
2021	Igor Marojević	Slikopisanje (from the book Sve za lepotu)
2022	Darko Tuševljaković	Hangar za snove
2023	Srđan V. Tešin	Crna Anđelija i druge zverske priče
2024	Vladimir Kopicl	Izmedju trudova
