= Meka Gruda =

Meka Gruda (Cyrillic: Мека Груда) may refer to either of two nearby villages in the Bileća municipality of Republika Srpska, Bosnia and Herzegovina:

- Donja Meka Gruda, Lower Meka Gruda
- Gornja Meka Gruda, Upper Meka Gruda
