= Brestice =

Brestice may refer to:

- Brestice, Bosnia and Herzegovina, a village near Bileća
- Brestice, Nikšić, a village in Nikšić municipality, Montenegro
