= Novica (given name) =

Novica (Serbian Cyrillic: Новица) is a Serbian and Montenegrin masculine given name. Notable people with the name include:

- Novica Bjelica (born 1983), Serbian volleyball player
- Novica Čanović (1961–1993), Serbian high jumper
- Novica Cerović (1805–1895), Montenegrin vojvoda
- Novica Eraković (born 1999), Montenegrin footballer
- Novica Maksimović (born 1988), Serbian footballer
- Novica Milenović (born 1989), Serbian footballer
- Novica Nikčević (born 1972), Slovene footballer
- Novica Radović (1890–1945), Montenegrin politician
- Novica Šaulić (1888–1959), Serbian ethnographer and folklorist
- Novica Simić (1948–2012), Bosnian Serb military general
- Novica Tadić (1949–2011), Serbian poet
- Novica Tončev (born 1962), Serbian politician
- Novica Urošević (1945–2009), Serbian musician
- Novica Veličković (born 1986), Serbian basketball player
- Novica Zdravković (1947–2021), Serbian folk singer
