= Alija Šuljak =

Bosnian professor, politician and Axis collaborator

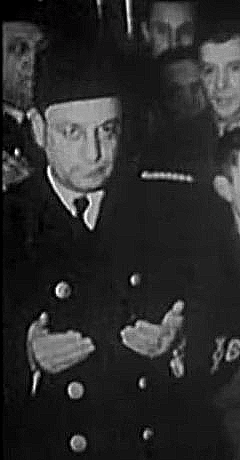
- Alija Šuljak in the 1940s

Chief adjutant for eastern Herzegovina
- In office July 1941 – 1943

Personal details
- Born: 10 October 1901 Zasad, near Trebinje, Austro-Hungarian occupied Bosnia and Herzegovina
- Died: 18 October 1992 (aged 91) Istanbul, Turkey
- Relations: Hasan Šuljak (brother)
- Children: Nedim Sülyak (son)
- Awards: Order of Merit, 1st Class; Order of the German Eagle, 3rd Class

Military service
- Allegiance: Independent State of Croatia; Nazi Germany
- Branch/service: Ustaše Militia
- Years of service: 1941–1945
- Battles/wars: World War II

Alija Šuljak (10 October 1901 – 18 October 1992) was a Bosnian Muslim Ustaše official, diplomat and businessman who was active in the Axis puppet state known as the Independent State of Croatia (NDH) from 1941 to 1945.

The son of a Trebinje café owner, Šuljak was arrested in 1934 for his involvement with the fascist, Croatian nationalist Ustaše movement. Although he was soon released, his freedom of movement was restricted by the Yugoslav authorities. He unsuccessfully ran as a candidate in the 1935 and 1938 Yugoslav parliamentary elections. Following the Axis invasion, occupation and dismemberment of the country in April 1941, NDH leader Ante Pavelić entrusted him with the title of chief adjutant for eastern Herzegovina. In this capacity, he oversaw a series of anti-Serb atrocities in 1941.

In 1943, Šuljak was briefly involved in a recruitment drive for the 13th Waffen Mountain Division of the SS Handschar, but was dismissed at the request of German officials. He fled the NDH as it collapsed in May 1945 and sought refuge in Italy before relocating to Egypt, where he found employment with Dresdner Bank. In 1947, he and his brother Hasan worked on cultivating diplomatic relations between the Vatican and Egypt, which later that year became the first country in the Muslim world to establish such ties with the Holy See. Šuljak spent the rest of his career advising various Middle Eastern and North African governments on cooperative banking. In 1964, he relocated to Istanbul, where he died in 1992.

== Early life ==
Alija Šuljak was born in the village of Zasad, near Trebinje, on 10 October 1901. He completed his primary education in his native village and later enrolled in a trade school in Sarajevo. His father Hasan owned a coffee house in Trebinje called Café Šuljak, which was popular with members of the Austro-Hungarian military. Author Fritz Telmann recounted in 1919 how a young Trebinje café owner named Alija, which the historian Cathie Carmichael surmises was likely a reference to Šuljak, publicly broke down in tears upon learning of Austria-Hungary's dissolution, saying, "The Austrians made everything beautiful for us, the streets, the railway, and our children could learn in school."

After the war, Šuljak continued his post-secondary studies in Vienna and Zagreb, graduating in 1923 from the University of Zagreb's Higher School of Economics and Commerce and its Faculty of Philosophy. From 1923 to 1941, he lectured on-and-off at a Dubrovnik trade academy. According to author George Lepre, Šuljak was among a group of prominent Muslims who "felt themselves to be Croatian nationals." Like several of his co-religionists who were active in interwar Yugoslavia's political life, such as Ademaga Mešić and Hakija Hadžić, he was a friend of Ante Pavelić, the leader of the fascist, Croatian nationalist Ustaše movement. In 1931, Šuljak was fired for refusing to cast his vote for a pro-government party, and following King Alexander's assassination as the result of an Ustaše plot in Marseille in October 1934, he was imprisoned in Dubrovnik and charged with "maintaining ties with terrorists". Although he was later released, his freedom of movement was restricted. He was, however, allowed to resume teaching at the trade academy.

Šuljak unsuccessfully ran as a candidate representing Trebinje as part of the 1935 Yugoslavian parliamentary election. The following year, he became one of the founders of the Muslim branch of the Croatian Peasant Party, which was established in opposition to the Yugoslav Muslim Organization. In 1937, he helped establish a branch of the Croatian Workers' Cooperative in Dubrovnik and became its honorary president. The year after that, he again ran as an opposition candidate in Gacko as part of the 1938 Yugoslavian parliamentary election.

== World War II ==
Following the Axis invasion of Yugoslavia on 6 April 1941 and the subsequent proclamation of the puppet state known as the Independent State of Croatia (Croatian: Nezavisna država Hrvatska; NDH), Šuljak openly sided with the Ustaše. He soon returned to Trebinje and arranged a gathering of Catholic and Muslim Ustaše supporters at the Hotel Naglić. At this meeting, he openly called for the killing of Serbs and the plunder of their property. To this end, an Ustaše headquarters was established in Trebinje, headed by a local dentist named Muhamed Šarić. From this base in Trebinje, as well as from nearby Gacko, Šuljak oversaw the persecution of the region's Serbs in 1941. In May 1941, he was appointed by Pavelić as a so-called "trustee" (Croatian: povjerenik) for eastern Herzegovina. In this position, he was directly subordinated to Colonel (Croatian: pukovnik) Jure Francetić, who had been appointed the principal commissioner for Bosnia and Herzegovina. In July 1941, Šuljak was given the title of chief adjutant (Croatian: poglavni pobočnik) for eastern Herzegovina within the Main Ustaša Headquarters. Thus, on paper at least, he occupied the third highest-ranking position within the Ustaše hierarchy, below Pavelić himself (the Poglavnik) and Mile Budak, Ademaga Mešić and Jozo Sunarić (all three of whom held the position of Doglavnik).

In the words of historian David Motadel, Šuljak was "notorious for his aggressive Ustaša propaganda." On 27 May 1941, Šuljak and Herman Togonal spoke at a hotel in Gacko, telling their listeners that all Serbs would be exterminated and that those who could not be exterminated would be expelled to Serbia. At a rally in the village of Gornji Borač on 2 August, he asserted that the Axis were invincible, called for violence against the Serb population and vowed that lands that had once been owned by Muslim feudal landlords, and which had been expropriated over the preceding decades, would be returned. In the late autumn of 1941, Šuljak organized Ustaše units in Borač who torched the Serb-populated villages of Bodenište and Vratlo. In October 1941, he helped plan the transport of Jews to the Kerestinec concentration camp, near Zagreb. He spent the rest of the year working on the establishment of NDH institutions in eastern Herzegovina. According to the historian Enver Redžić, Šuljak and Hakija Hadžić subsequently "became leading figures in Sarajevo Ustasha circles, in promoting anti-Serbian and anti-Jewish propaganda directed at cleansing Bosnia and Herzegovina of Serbs, Jews and others, and transforming it into an ethnically pure Croatian land." Afterwards, Šuljak left the Poglavnik's office to become a professor at the Zagreb Trade Academy, whilst retaining his title of chief adjutant.

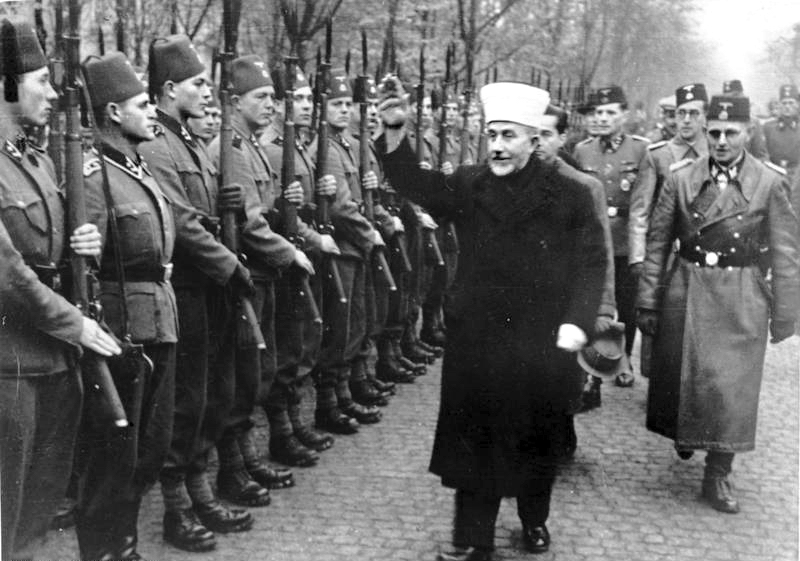
The Mufti of Jerusalem, Haj Amin al-Husseini, seen here reviewing Bosnian SS volunteers in 1943, was asked to join the Handschar recruitment drive after Šuljak's dismissal.

In 1943, Pavelić appointed Šuljak to assist with the formation of the 13th Waffen Mountain Division of the SS Handschar. On 20 March 1943, Šuljak and the multilingual SS officer Karl von Krempler, together with several other dignitaries, embarked on an eighteen-day recruitment drive in eleven Bosnian districts, citing the example of Austro-Hungarian emperor Franz Joseph's Bosnian-Herzegovinian Infantry in a bid to persuade Bosnian Muslims to enlist. To this end, Šuljak spoke at several rallies in Živinice and Gračanica. However, according to Lepre, the pro-Ustaše Muslim faction "was held in fairly low regard by the majority of Bosnia's Muslims" by this point, and Šuljak's donning of an Ustaše uniform and his pro-Ustaše speeches were met with "sound rejection from the Muslim population." Šuljak, however, attributed his recruiting difficulties solely to von Krempler. "The only friction that occurred," he later said, "was caused by the fact that [von Krempler] spoke in the Serbian dialect during the public meetings, which greatly irritated my countrymen. It would have been much better if [he] had simply kept his mouth shut." Šuljak also recalled an episode from this time which greatly embarrassed his SS counterpart: "Von Krempler ... had lived in Greece for a time ... As we passed through Slavonski Brod, we came upon a transport of Jews from Salonika that was heading north. Many of these Jews knew [von] Krempler as an old friend and heartily greeted him, which in my presence was quite embarrassing for him." The journalist Edwin Black describes what happened next: "No matter, the train continued on. So did von Krempler and Suljak. Each had his own destiny in the protracted nightmare of the Holocaust." Approximately 98 percent of Salonika's 50,000 Jews were killed after being transported to death camps across Europe.

Von Krempler relayed an extremely negative assessment of Šuljak to his superior, SS-Obergruppenführer und General der Waffen-SS Artur Phleps. On 6 April 1943, a conference was held at the home of the German plenipotentiary general to the NDH, Edmund Glaise-Horstenau, where Phleps informed Ustaše official Vjekoslav Vrančić of his dissatisfaction with Šuljak and demanded his dismissal. Vrančić promised Phleps that two Croat officers would be sent to replace him. (Note: However, according to Šuljak's brother Hasan, Šuljak requested that Pavelić relieve him of his duties after learning that Handschar would be deployed to the Eastern Front, and not to Bosnia.) In light of von Krempler and Šuljak's failure to attract new recruits, the Germans asked the Mufti of Jerusalem, Haj Amin al-Husseini, to join the recruitment drive instead.

== Exile and later years ==
Over the course of the war, Šuljak was awarded the Order of Merit, 1st Class by Pavelić, as well as the Order of the German Eagle, 3rd Class. He left Zagreb on 8 May 1945, as the NDH was collapsing before the Yugoslav Partisans and the Western Allies, and entered Italy through Austria the following month. In Rome, he associated with Adil Zulfikarpašić, who had briefly served as an official in Yugoslav leader Josip Broz Tito's post-war socialist government but later became disillusioned with communism and defected to the West, and who from 1990 to 1996 would serve as the vice president of the Republic of Bosnia and Herzegovina. In early 1947, Šuljak settled in Cairo, where he found employment with the German Dresdner Bank. (Note: During World War II, Dresdner seized a number of pre-war banking institutions in occupied Europe, including Zagreb's Jugoslavenska banka, which was renamed Kroatische Landesbank. Over the course of the war, Dresdner lent 47 million Reichsmarks to the SS. According to historian Harald Wixforth, "Without the help of the bank, the SS could not have constructed its large network of business interests." Dresdner also financed and owned a sizeable stake in Huta Hoch- und Tiefbau, a construction company that built some of the crematoriums at Auschwitz.) Beginning in 1947, he and his brother Hasan worked on cultivating ties between the Vatican and Egypt, which later that year became the first country in the Muslim world to establish diplomatic relations with the Holy See.

From 1948 to 1956, Šuljak advised the Syrian government on cooperative banking, helping to establish the country's first cooperative bank. In 1950, he published a book titled Facts of the Cooperative Economy, one of several he would write over the course of his life about cooperative banking. Between 1958 and 1962, he advised the government of Tunisia in a similar capacity. In 1964, he relocated to Istanbul, and over the next two years assisted with the establishment of the first Turkish bank based on cooperative principles. After almost fifty years abroad, Šuljak and his son Nedim visited Dubrovnik in 1991, shortly before the town was besieged by the Yugoslav People's Army and Serb paramilitaries amid the Breakup of Yugoslavia. (Note: In 1982, Nedim, a former University of Illinois student, was charged with conspiracy to sell aircraft parts to Libya in contravention of American export restrictions. At the time, federal officials called it "the biggest criminal case in U.S. history involving the sale of contraband military equipment to a foreign government." During the Bosnian War, Nedim was alleged to have conspired with Bosnia's wartime Prime Minister Haris Silajdžić and Deputy Federal Minister of Defence Hasan Čengić in smuggling weapons from former Eastern Bloc countries to warzones in Africa.) Šuljak died in Istanbul on 18 October 1992, aged 91.

== See also ==
- Ivo Rojnica
