= Vitalac =

Village in Montenegro

Coordinates: 42°46′37″N 18°54′00″E

Vitalac (Serbian Cyrillic: Виталац) is a village in the Nikšić municipality of Montenegro. Once a separate settlement, the westbound expansion of Nikšić over the years means that Vitalac forms part of a conurbation with the larger city. The village is located along the main road to Montenegro's border crossings with Bosnia and Herzegovina (one for Trebinje and the other for Bileća).
