= Trnovica =

Trnovica may refer to several places:

In Bosnia and Herzegovina

- Trnovica, Bileća, a village
- Trnovica, Kalinovik, a village
- Trnovica, Zvornik, a village near Zvornik

In Croatia

- Trnovica, Dubrovnik-Neretva County, a village in Dubrovačko Primorje
- Trnovica, Primorje-Gorski Kotar County, a village near Jelenje

In Kosovo

- Trnovica, Kosovo, a village near Podujevo

In Montenegro

- Trnovica, Montenegro, a village near Kolašin

In Slovenia

- Trnovica, Ivančna Gorica, a village
