= Novica Šaulić =

Serbian ethnographer

Novica Šaulić (1888–1959) was a major Serbian ethnographer and folklorist along with Nikola Kašiković and Andrija Luburić. Šaulić always fought for Serbian self-determination during political strife in Montenegro.

Folklorists Milman Parry and Albert Lord used the collections of Šaulić, Kašiković and Luburić to record on phonographs the works of Serbian epic verse recited by guslars.

== Works ==
- Narodne priče iz zbirke Novice Šaulića (Folk tales from the collection of Novica Šaulić) (1953)
- Prvi srpski ustanak: narodne pjesme (The first Serbian uprising: folk songs) (1954)
- Srpske narodne pesme: iz zbirke narodnih pesama (1936)
- Srpske narodne priče iz zbirke narodnih pripovjedaka (1922)
- Srpske narodne priče (1925)
