= Preraca =

- Village
- Location within Bosnia and Herzegovina
- Coordinates: 42°58′32″N 18°27′39″E
- Country: Bosnia and Herzegovina
- Entity: Republika Srpska
- Municipality: Bileća
- Time zone: UTC+1 (CET)
  - Summer (DST): UTC+2 (CEST)

Preraca (Serbian Cyrillic: Прераца) is a village in the municipality of Bileća, Republika Srpska, Bosnia and Herzegovina.
