= Bijeljani =

Bijeljani Бијељани
- Village
- Location within Bosnia and Herzegovina
- Coordinates: 43°04′N 18°15′E
- Country: Bosnia and Herzegovina
- Entity: Republika Srpska
- Municipality: Bileća

Population (1991)
  - Total: 138
- Time zone: UTC+1 (CET)
  - Summer (DST): UTC+2 (CEST)

Bijeljani (Serbian Cyrillic: Бијељани) is a village in the municipality of Bileća, Republika Srpska, Bosnia and Herzegovina. According to the 1991 census the village had a population of 138 people. A monastery was once located in Bijeljani, Dabarsko polje, Stolac. There is also a mosque in the village.
