= Todorići, Bileća =

Todorići
- Village
- Location within Bosnia and Herzegovina
- Coordinates: 42°58′44″N 18°15′12″E
- Country: Bosnia and Herzegovina
- Municipality: Bileća
- Time zone: UTC+1 (CET)
  - Summer (DST): UTC+2 (CEST)

Todorići is a village in the municipality of Bileća, Bosnia and Herzegovina.

Todorići is a small village where most people depend on farming and raising animals.
