= The Book of Blam =

Novel about Novi Sad Raids

- 2000 edition
- Author: Aleksandar Tišma
- Language: Serbo-Croatian
- Publication date: 1972

The Book of Blam (Serbian Cyrillic: Књига о Бламу, Knjiga o Blamu) is a semi-autobiographical novel by Aleksandar Tišma, first published in Serbo-Croatian in 1972. It was republished by New York Review Books in 2016 in its classics series, with an introduction by Charles Simic. It is one in a trilogy of books by Tišma about life in Novi Sad in the 1940s, a city made infamous as the location for summary executions during World War Two, and what is now the second largest city in Serbia. The other books in the trilogy are Kapo and The Use of Man. The Book of Blam can be considered as belonging to the literature of the Holocaust. It can also be considered as a portrayal of Survivor Guilt. On first publication, it was met with acclaim in France and Germany. It has been translated into 17 languages.

== Plot ==
The work centres on its middle-aged protagonist, Miroslav Blam, who recounts in detail his childhood and his experiences before, during and after the infamous raid by Hungarian forces on Jews and Serbs at Novi Sad, in the former Yugoslavia, in 1942. The raid led to the summary execution of some 1,400 people, including Blam's own family members. The description of the raid itself is most prominently featured in the eleventh of the work's fifteen chapters.

Blam’s family history, the various business occupants of Jew Street before the war, Blam’s professional life both before and during the war, and love letters sent to him after the war each receive extended treatment in the novel.

Blam’s romantic relationship with his cousin Lili Ehrlich, whom Blam impregnates, his courting and unfaithful marriage to Janja and the death of his sister Estera, a resistance fighter, in a battle with Hungarian gendarmes are also featured prominently in the book.

== Theme ==
Blam is a convert to Christianity by virtue of his marrying Janja, a non-Jew, which is the reason he is able to avoid persecution, and his feelings of guilt as a survivor—as most of his family perish during the war—is a theme in the book as noted by S. Hargrave. Blam is one of the few Jewish survivors of the Novi Sad raids.
