= Šobadine =

Šobadine Шобадине
- Village
- Location within Bosnia and Herzegovina
- Coordinates: 42°53′37″N 18°21′24″E
- Country: Bosnia and Herzegovina
- Entity: Republika Srpska
- Municipality: Bileća
- Time zone: UTC+1 (CET)
  - Summer (DST): UTC+2 (CEST)

Šobadine (Serbian Cyrillic: Шобадине) is a village in the municipality of Bileća, Republika Srpska, Bosnia and Herzegovina.
