= Narat =

Narat Нарат
- Village
- Location within Bosnia and Herzegovina
- Coordinates: 43°00′N 18°21′E
- Country: Bosnia and Herzegovina
- Entity: Republika Srpska
- Municipality: Bileća
- Time zone: UTC+1 (CET)
  - Summer (DST): UTC+2 (CEST)

Narat (Serbian Cyrillic: Нарат) is a village in the municipality of Bileća, Republika Srpska, Bosnia and Herzegovina.
