= Žudojevići =

- Village
- Location within Bosnia and Herzegovina
- Coordinates: 42°47′N 18°24′E
- Country: Bosnia and Herzegovina
- Entity: Republika Srpska
- Municipality: Bileća
- Time zone: UTC+1 (CET)
  - Summer (DST): UTC+2 (CEST)

Žudojevići (Serbian Cyrillic: Жудојевићи) is a village in the municipality of Bileća, Republika Srpska, Bosnia and Herzegovina.
