= Dragiša Kašiković =

Bosnian author

- Born: 9 August 1932; Hadžići, Kingdom of Yugoslavia
- Died: 19 June 1977 (aged 44); Chicago, Illinois, United States
- Cause of death: Assassination by stabbing
- Occupation: Writer
- Children: Ivanka Milosevich (stepdaughter)

Dragiša Kašiković (Serbian Cyrillic: Драгиша Кашиковић; 9 August 1932 – 19 June 1977) was a Bosnian Serb writer who came to international renown after he and his nine-year-old stepdaughter were murdered.

== Biography ==
Kašiković was born on 9 August 1932, in Hadžići near Sarajevo in an upper-middle class Bosnian Serb family originally from Trebinje, East Herzegovina. His father's name was Branko and his mother's Nevenka (née Rakić). Dragiša's grandfather was Nikola Kašiković, the editor of Bosanska vila which was one of the most well-known Serbian newspapers of that time.

After graduating high school, Kašiković enrolled in the University of Belgrade's Faculty of Law but was expelled due to his anti-communist and anti-regime beliefs. He managed to continue his studies in Ljubljana afterwards. In the meantime he wrote books for children and published his first two books.

As a law school student in 1952, the District Court of Dubrovnik sentenced Kašiković to eight months of strict jail for attempting to illegally leave the country.

Kašiković managed to cross the Yugoslav border in 1955 and move to Austria where he lived for two years. After struggling to survive, he moved to the United States with seven dollars in his pocket where he would continue his pro-monarchist activism.

Upon arriving in Chicago, he became the editor-in-chief of the emigrant newspaper Sloboda which was the official newspaper of the Serbian National Defense Council. Upon becoming editor, the newspaper was about to go defunct but Kašiković managed to renew interest in it. In 1963, Kašiković initiated the literary newspaper Danas and the satirical newspaper Čičak and began leading the Serbian National Defense Council's radio program. He also began translating works from the English language for the Serbian Orthodox Church in the United States. Kašiković graduated from university in the United States and was fluent in English, German and French along with his native Serbian.

== Death ==
In the early morning hours of 19 June 1977, Kašiković and his nine-year-old stepdaughter Ivanka Milosevich were brutally murdered in the Chicago headquarters. Kašiković, sitting at his typewriter, was stabbed with a sharp knife 64 times. Hearing the commotion, his stepdaughter ran out and was stabbed 54 times. The murder case remains unsolved.

He is interred in the cemetery of the Saint Sava Serbian Orthodox Monastery in Libertyville, Illinois.

== Notable books ==
- Genocid u Hrvatskoj 1941–1945
- Spomenica Draži
- Poručnik Kavaja
- Dupljaci
- Partija te tuži, Partija ti sudi

== See also ==
- List of homicides in Illinois
- List of unsolved murders (1900–1979)
