= Vrbica, Bileća =

Vrbica Врбица
- Village
- Location within Bosnia and Herzegovina
- Coordinates: 42°56′33″N 18°28′34″E
- Country: Bosnia and Herzegovina
- Entity: Republika Srpska
- Municipality: Bileća
- Time zone: UTC+1 (CET)
  - Summer (DST): UTC+2 (CEST)

Vrbica (Serbian Cyrillic: Врбица) is a village in the municipality of Bileća, Republika Srpska, Bosnia and Herzegovina.
