= Zaušje =

Zaušje Заушје
- Village
- Location within Bosnia and Herzegovina
- Coordinates: 43°04′43″N 18°15′03″E
- Country: Bosnia and Herzegovina
- Entity: Republika Srpska
- Municipality: Bileća
- Time zone: UTC+1 (CET)
  - Summer (DST): UTC+2 (CEST)

Zaušje (Serbian Cyrillic: Заушје) is a village in the municipality of Bileća, Republika Srpska, Bosnia and Herzegovina. Before 1992, a large majority (99%) of the population consisted of Bosniaks, and 148 people lived in the village. According to the 2013 census, only 11 people live in the village.
