= Baljci, Bileća =

Baljci
- Village
- Location within Bosnia and Herzegovina
- Coordinates: 42°54′N 18°27′E
- Country: Bosnia and Herzegovina
- Entity: Republika Srpska
- Municipality: Bileća
- Time zone: UTC+1 (CET)
  - Summer (DST): UTC+2 (CEST)

Baljci (Serbian Cyrillic: Баљци) is a village in the municipality of Bileća, Republika Srpska, Bosnia and Herzegovina.

Grebenice-Bunčići site of stećak monuments near Baljci is included in the UNESCO World Heritage list.
