= Mirilovići =

Mirilovići Мириловићи
- Village
- Location within Bosnia and Herzegovina
- Coordinates: 42°52′18″N 18°21′18″E
- Country: Bosnia and Herzegovina
- Entity: Republika Srpska
- Municipality: Bileća
- Time zone: UTC+1 (CET)
  - Summer (DST): UTC+2 (CEST)

Mirilovići (Serbian Cyrillic: Мириловићи) is a village in the municipality of Bileća, Republika Srpska, Bosnia and Herzegovina. The village was named after a local medieval Vlach tribe of the same name. The paternal family of famous Serbian writer Momo Kapor was from the Mirilovići village. His father Gojko Kapor was buried at the local Serbian Orthodox Church cemetery.
