= Vranjska, Bileća =

Vranjska Врањска
- Village
- Location within Bosnia and Herzegovina
- Coordinates: 43°01′18″N 18°12′54″E
- Country: Bosnia and Herzegovina
- Entity: Republika Srpska
- Municipality: Bileća
- Time zone: UTC+1 (CET)
  - Summer (DST): UTC+2 (CEST)

Vranjska (Serbian Cyrillic: Врањска, pronounced [ʋrâɲska]) is a village in the municipality of Bileća, Republika Srpska, Bosnia and Herzegovina.
