= Dola, Bileća =

Dola Дола
- Village
- Location within Bosnia and Herzegovina
- Coordinates: 42°50′51″N 18°12′34″E
- Country: Bosnia and Herzegovina
- Entity: Republika Srpska
- Municipality: Bileća
- Time zone: UTC+1 (CET)
  - Summer (DST): UTC+2 (CEST)

Dola (Serbian Cyrillic: Дола) is a village in the municipality of Bileća, Bosnia and Herzegovina.
