= Rioca =

Rioca Риоца
- Village
- Location within Bosnia and Herzegovina
- Coordinates: 43°04′48″N 18°21′00″E
- Country: Bosnia and Herzegovina
- Entity: Republika Srpska
- Municipality: Bileća
- Time zone: UTC+1 (CET)
  - Summer (DST): UTC+2 (CEST)

Rioca (Serbian Cyrillic: Риоца) is a village in the municipality of Bileća, Republika Srpska, Bosnia and Herzegovina.

== Notable people ==
- Mrdak Luburić, participant in the Herzegovina Uprising and a gusle player, father of Andrija Luburić.
