= Church of Saint Sava, Bileća =

Church in Bosnia and Herzegovina

Church of Saint Sava
- Црква светог Саве
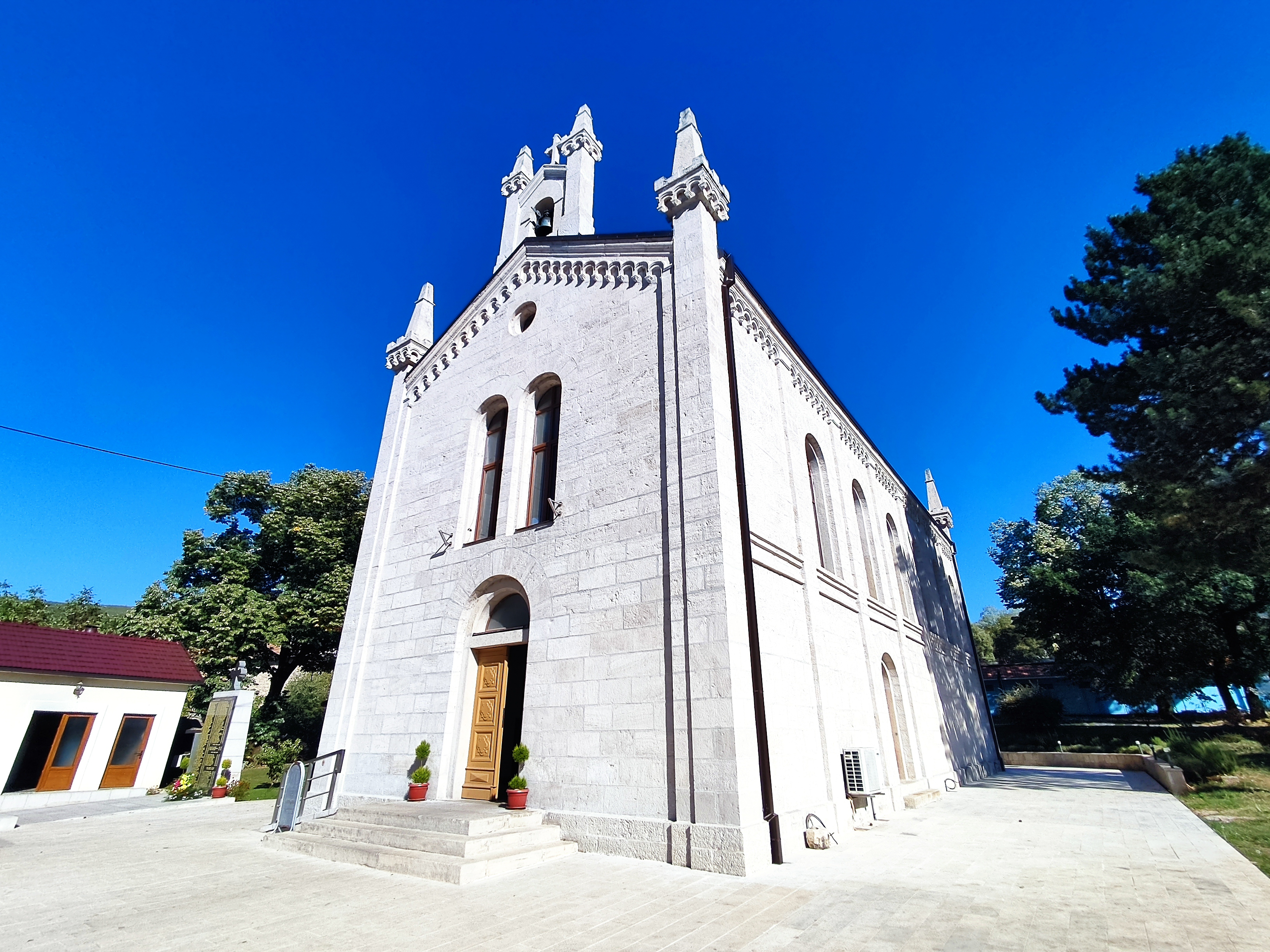
- Church of Saint Sava
- Church of Saint Sava
- 42°52′32″N 18°25′44″E
- Country: Bosnia and Herzegovina
- Denomination: Serbian Orthodox

History
- Dedication: Saint Sava

Architecture
- Completed: 1896

Administration
- Archdiocese: Eparchy of Zahumlje and Herzegovina

The Church of Saint Sava (Serbian: Црква светог Саве) is a Serbian Orthodox church located in the village of Bileća in the Republika Srpska, Bosnia and Herzegovina. Dedicated to Saint Sava, it was constructed in 1896 in neo-Romano-Gothic style. The Church was proclaimed a National Monument by the commission to Preserve National Monuments of Bosnia and Herzegovina in 2006.

== Architecture ==
The church is a simple single-nave structure with a ceiling, adorned with small corner turrets, a bell-cot, oculi under the gables, and a frieze of blind arcades beneath the roof cornice. The close resemblance of corner turrets and cornices between the Sarajevo Evangelical Church (today Academy of Fine Arts Sarajevo) and the Bileća church suggests Karel Pařík may have been involved in creating the plan, for which Bileća priest Perinović thanked the Provincial Government of Austro-Hungarian Bosnia.

== See also ==
- Eparchy of Zahumlje and Herzegovina
