= Podosoje, Bileća =

Podosoje Подосоје
- Village
- Location within Bosnia and Herzegovina
- Coordinates: 42°57′22″N 18°23′33″E
- Country: Bosnia and Herzegovina
- Entity: Republika Srpska
- Municipality: Bileća
- Time zone: UTC+1 (CET)
  - Summer (DST): UTC+2 (CEST)

Podosoje (Serbian Cyrillic: Подосоје) is a village in the municipality of Bileća, Republika Srpska, Bosnia and Herzegovina.
