= Bodenik =

Bodenik Боденик
- Village
- Location within Bosnia and Herzegovina
- Coordinates: 42°55′N 18°21′E
- Country: Bosnia and Herzegovina
- Entity: Republika Srpska
- Municipality: Bileća
- Time zone: UTC+1 (CET)
  - Summer (DST): UTC+2 (CEST)

Bodenik (Serbian Cyrillic: Боденик) is a village in the municipality of Bileća, Republika Srpska, Bosnia and Herzegovina.
