= Jelena Lengold =

Serbian poet, novelist and journalist

- Born: 15 July 1959 (age 67); Kruševac
- Occupations: Poet, novelist, journalist
- Writing career
- Notable work: Vašarski Mađioničar (Fairground Magician)
- Notable awards: EU Prize for Literature

Jelena Lengold (born 15 July 1959) is a Serbian poet, novelist and journalist. A longtime cultural reporter for Radio Belgrade, Lengold has published a number of books, including poetry, novels, and short stories.

== Biography ==
She was born in Kruševac.

Her short story collection Vašarski Mađioničar or "Fairground Magician" as it translates in English, was published by Istros Books in 2013. "Fairground Magician" won the EU Prize for Literature.

Her poetry collection Bunar teških reči was awarded with Jefimijin vez. She received Andrić Prize for her short story collection Raščarani svet.

Lengold's books have been translated into English, German, Spanish, Italian, Danish, Bulgarian, Macedonian, Polish, Greek, Czech, Slovenian, Hungarian and Albanian.

== Works ==
=== Poetry collections ===
- Raspad botanike (1982)
- Vreteno (1984)
- Podneblje maka (1986)
- Prolazak anđela (1989)
- Sličice iz života kapelmajstora (1991)
- Bunar teških reči (2011)
- Izaberi jedno mesto (2016)

=== Short story collections ===
- Pokisli lavovi (1994)
- Lift (1999)
- Vašarski mađioničar (2008, 2009, 2012)
- Prestraši me (2009)
- U tri kod Kandinskog (2013)
- Raščarani svet (2016)
- Dirakova jednačina (2025)

=== Novels ===
- Baltimor (2003, 2011)
- Odustajanje (2018)
