= Bijela Rudina =

Bijela Rudina Бијела Рудина
- Village
- Location within Bosnia and Herzegovina
- Coordinates: 42°56′N 18°25′E
- Country: Bosnia and Herzegovina
- Entity: Republika Srpska
- Municipality: Bileća
- Time zone: UTC+1 (CET)
  - Summer (DST): UTC+2 (CEST)

Bijela Rudina (Serbian Cyrillic: Бијела Рудина) is a village in the municipality of Bileća, Republika Srpska, Bosnia and Herzegovina. It consists of three smaller villages: Krstače, Bijela Rudina and Milićevići.
