= Korita, Bileća =

Korita Корита
- Village
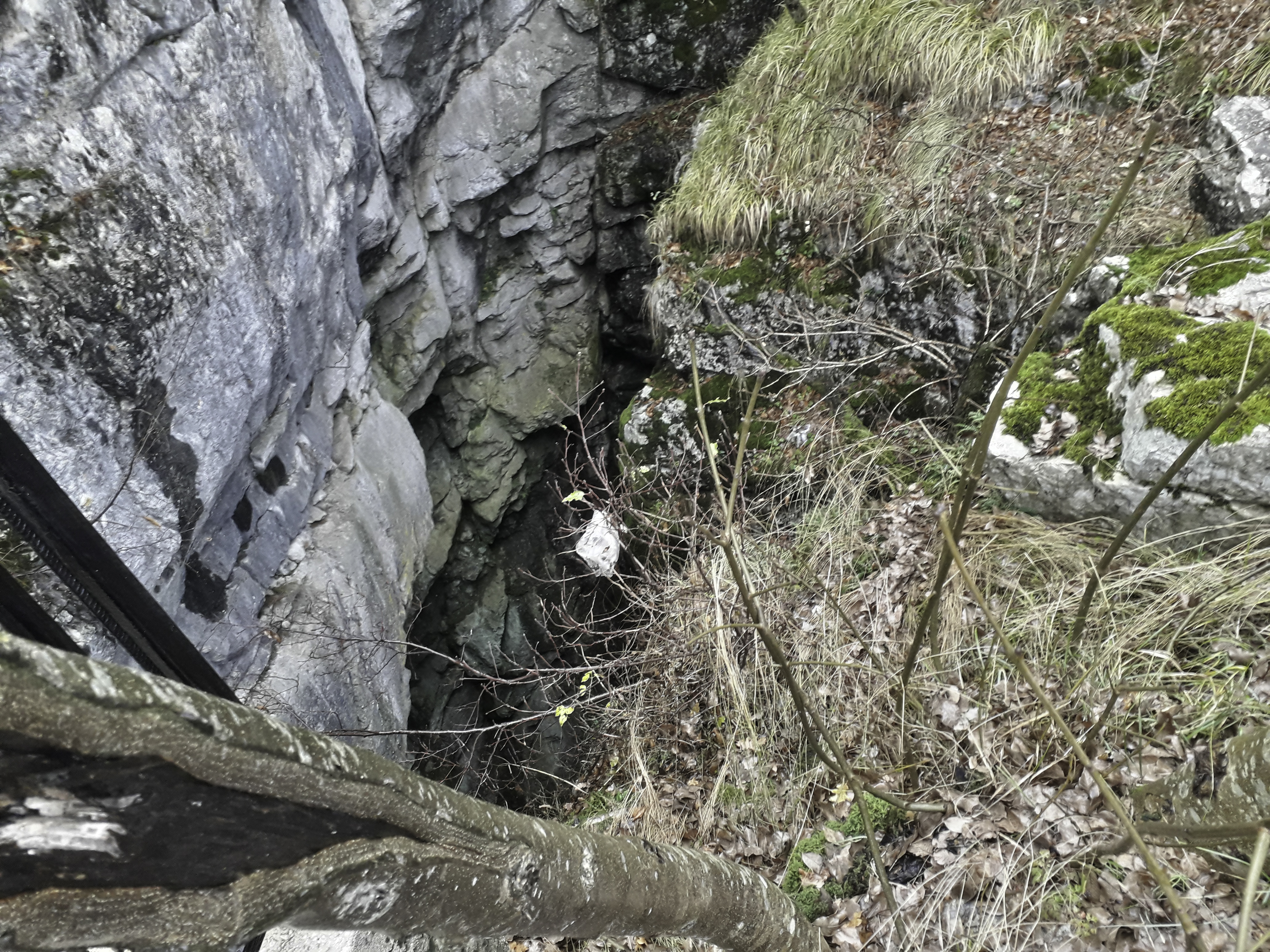
- A pit in which Ustaše threw killed Serb civilians during the Genocide of Serbs in the Independent State of Croatia

- Location within Republika Srpska
- Country: Bosnia and Herzegovina
- Entity: Republika Srpska
- Municipality: Bileća
- Time zone: UTC+1 (CET)
  - Summer (DST): UTC+2 (CEST)

Korita (Serbian Cyrillic: Корита) is a village in the municipality of Bileća, Republika Srpska, Bosnia and Herzegovina.

During June 3 and 4, 1941, Ustaše massacred 130 ethnic Serbs in the village.
