= Krstače =

Krstače Крстаче
- Village
- Location within Bosnia and Herzegovina
- Coordinates: 42°57′38″N 18°17′35″E
- Country: Bosnia and Herzegovina
- Entity: Republika Srpska
- Municipality: Bileća
- Time zone: UTC+1 (CET)
  - Summer (DST): UTC+2 (CEST)

Krstače (Serbian Cyrillic: Крстаче) is a village in the municipality of Bileća, Republika Srpska, Bosnia and Herzegovina.
