= Njemanica =

Njemanica Њеманица
- Village
- Location within Bosnia and Herzegovina
- Coordinates: 43°53′N 18°31′E
- Country: Bosnia and Herzegovina
- Entity: Republika Srpska
- Municipality: Istočni Stari Grad
- Time zone: UTC+1 (CET)
  - Summer (DST): UTC+2 (CEST)

Njemanica (Serbian Cyrillic: Њеманица) is a village in Bosnia and Herzegovina. According to the 1991 census, the village is located in the municipality of Istočni Stari Grad. According to the 2003 census, there are 143 inhabitants in the village.
