= Donja Meka Gruda =

Donja Meka Gruda Доња Мека Груда
- Village
- Location within Bosnia and Herzegovina
- Coordinates: 43°01′N 18°26′E
- Country: Bosnia and Herzegovina
- Entity: Republika Srpska
- Municipality: Bileća
- Time zone: UTC+1 (CET)
  - Summer (DST): UTC+2 (CEST)

Donja Meka Gruda (Serbian Cyrillic: Доња Мека Груда) is a village in the municipality of Bileća, Republika Srpska, Bosnia and Herzegovina.

== See also ==
- Gornja Meka Gruda
