= Bogdašići, Bileća =

Bogdašići Богдашићи
- Village
- Location within Bosnia and Herzegovina
- Coordinates: 42°55′52″N 18°26′30″E
- Country: Bosnia and Herzegovina
- Entity: Republika Srpska
- Municipality: Bileća
- Time zone: UTC+1 (CET)
  - Summer (DST): UTC+2 (CEST)

Bogdašići (Serbian Cyrillic: Богдашићи) is a village in the municipality of Bileća, Republika Srpska, Bosnia and Herzegovina.
