= Meka (surname) =

Meka is a surname with multiple origins. Notable people with the surname include:

- Meka Srikanth (born 1968), Indian actor
- Remy Ze Meka, Cameroonian politician
- René Claude Meka, chief of staff of the Cameroonian Armed Forces
- Roshan Meka (born 1999), Indian actor
