= Stoja Kašiković =

- Born: 1865; Bosanski Novi, Bosnia Eyalet, Ottoman Empire
- Died: after 1927
- Occupations: Teacher, feminist, and editor
- Relatives: Nikola T. Kašiković (husband)
- Writing career
- Notable work: The Bosnian Nymph (Bosanska vila)

Stoja Kašiković, née Zdjelarević (1865 – after 1927) was a Bosnian Serb feminist, writer, editor, and teacher.

== Life ==
Stoja Kašiković was born in 1865 in Bosanski Novi in the Bosnia Eyalet of the Ottoman Empire, and was probably orphaned at an early age because very little information is available about her family. She began school in Sarajevo in 1879, one year after the Bosnia Eyalet was occupied by the Austro-Hungarian Empire, at the only school for girls available in Bosnia, founded by Paulina Irby. She finished four years of elementary education by 1886 and had trained as a teacher. That same year, she married Nikola T. Kašiković, a teacher at Miss Irby's school. Together, they had three sons and a daughter. She herself taught at Miss Irby's school in the latter part of the first decade of the 1900s. During World War I, the Austro-Hungarian government convicted Stoja, Nikola and one of their sons of treason in 1917–18, but the convictions were negated when the Austro-Hungarian Empire collapsed later in 1918 and Bosnia became part of the Kingdom of Serbs, Croats and Slovenes (later Yugoslavia). Nothing is known of her life after the war other than she began receiving a pension after her husband's death in 1927.

== Activities ==
In 1885, Nikola Kašiković and three other teachers co-founded the literary magazine, The Bosnian Nymph (Bosanska vila), and Nikola became editor-in-chief two years later. When he became bedridden in 1891, Stoja became acting editor-in-chief and continued to co-edit the journal after his recovery, occasionally contributing articles as well. Both Kašikovićs were decorated by the Kingdoms of Serbia and Montenegro on the 25th anniversary of the magazine in 1910.
