= Luburić =

Luburić, sometimes transcribed Luburic or Luburich, is a South Slavic surname that originated in Herzegovina. It is borne by both Croats and Serbs.

- Melissa Bean née Luburić, former U.S. Representative
- Nada Luburić, sister of Vjekoslav, guard at Stara Gradiška
- Stevan Luburić (fl. 1924–1930), Yugoslav footballer, SK Jugoslavija
- Vjekoslav Luburić (1914–1969), World War II Ustaše official
