= Meka (given name) =

Meka is a unisex given name. Notable people with the name include:

- Meka Venkata Pratap Apparao, Indian politician
- Meka Rangaiah Appa Rao, Indian university vice-chancellor and politician
- Meka Whaitiri, New Zealand parliamentarian
