= Njivak =

Njivak Њивак (Serbian)
- Village (Selo)
- Location within Bosnia and Herzegovina
- Coordinates: 44°57′N 18°31′E
- Country: Bosnia and Herzegovina
- Municipality: Pelagićevo
- Time zone: UTC+1 (CET)
  - Summer (DST): UTC+2 (CEST)

Njivak (Serbian Cyrillic: Њивак) is a village in the municipality of Pelagićevo, Bosnia and Herzegovina.
