= Gornja Meka Gruda =

- Village
- Location within Bosnia and Herzegovina
- Coordinates: 43°01′N 18°24′E
- Country: Bosnia and Herzegovina
- Entity: Republika Srpska
- Municipality: Bileća
- Time zone: UTC+1 (CET)
  - Summer (DST): UTC+2 (CEST)

Gornja Meka Gruda (Serbian Cyrillic: Горња Мека Груда) is a village in the municipality of Bileća, Republika Srpska, Bosnia and Herzegovina.

== See also ==
- Donja Meka Gruda
