= Narodna knjiga–Alfa =

Serbian publisher

Narodna knjiga–Alfa is a Serbian publisher. It is one of the leading publishing houses in Serbia.

Its book series have included Sto klasika Narodna knjiga (100 Classics of Narodna Knjiga), Kraj veka (End of the Century), and Megahit. Serbian literature is published in the series Savremeni srpski and Antologija jugoslovenske pripovetke pisci.
