= Aleksandar Tišma =

Serbian writer

- Александар Тишма
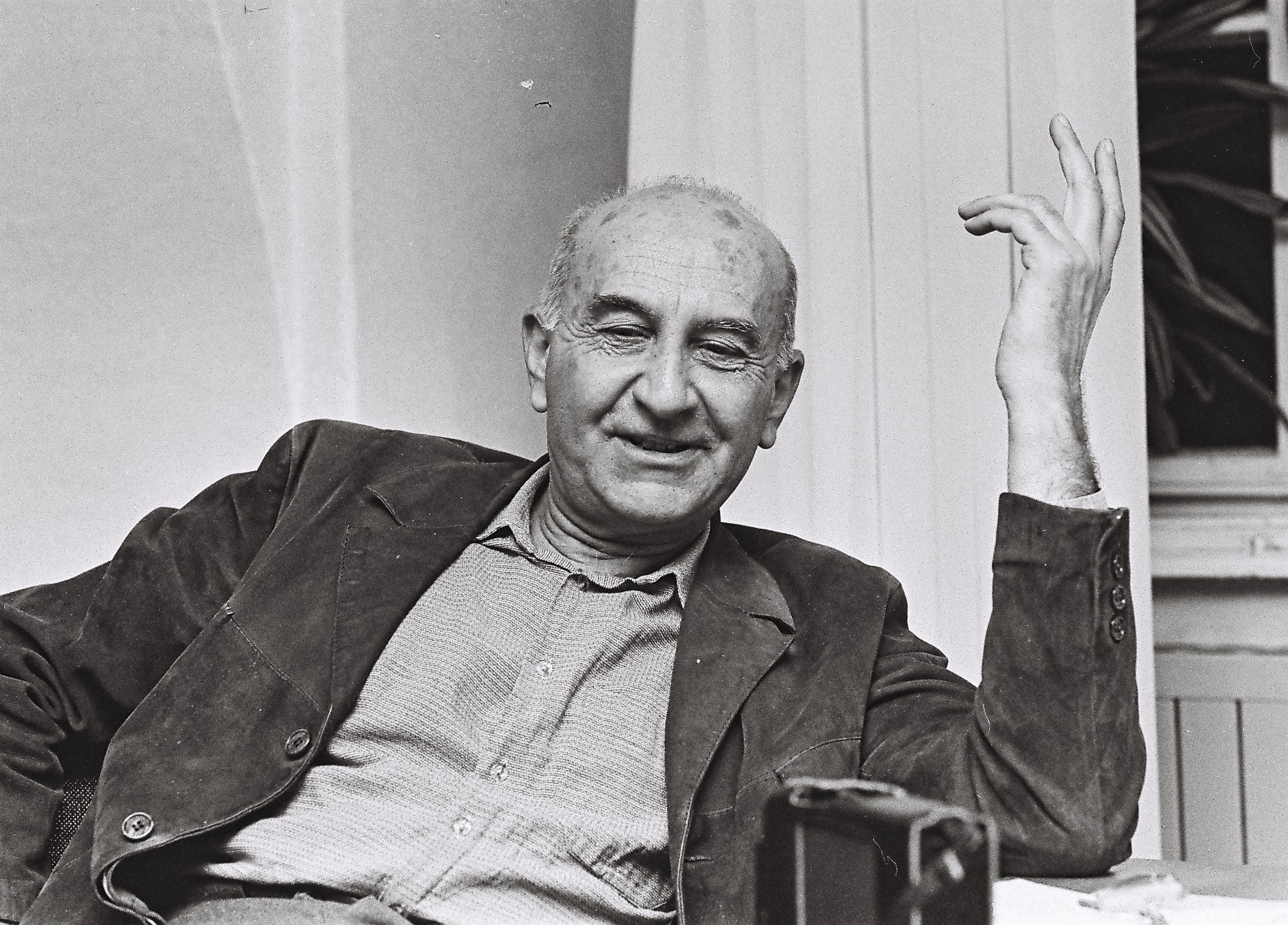
- Born: 16 January 1924; Horgoš, Kingdom of Serbs, Croats and Slovenes
- Died: 16 February 2003 (aged 79); Novi Sad, Serbia and Montenegro
- Education: University of Belgrade
- Occupations: Novelist, translator
- Awards: NIN Award (1976); Austrian State Prize for European Literature (1995)

Aleksandar Tišma (Serbian Cyrillic: Александар Тишма; 16 January 1924 – 16 February 2003) was a Serbian writer, best known for his "Novi Sad" trilogy of novels: The Book of Blam (1972), The Use of Man (1976), and Kapo (1987).

== Biography ==
Tišma was born in Horgoš, Kanjiža on the present-day border of Serbia and Hungary, to a Serbian father and a Hungarian-speaking Jewish mother.

He completed his elementary and middle school education in Novi Sad before going on to study economy and French language and literature in Budapest during World War II, finally graduating in Germanistics from the University of Belgrade Faculty of Philology.

From 1945 to 1949 he worked as a journalist for Slobodna Vojvodina and Borba newspapers, and then as editor and redactor at Matica srpska until his retirement in 1982.

Aleksandar Tišma also translated works of other authors from German and Hungarian into Serbian, notably Imre Kertész's novel Fatelessness.

He became a corresponding member of the Vojvodina Academy of Sciences and Arts (VANU) in 1979 and was promoted into a regular member in 1984, and subsequently became a regular member of the Serbian Academy of Sciences and Arts (SANU) upon their fusion 1992. From 2002, he was also a member of the Academy of Arts, Berlin.

Tišma's works were concerned with themes of humanity's search for freedom, and suffering, violence, horror and guilt people encounter along the way. Along with Czesław Miłosz, Danilo Kiš and György Konrád, his works are sometimes classified as part of "Mitteleuropa" literature—dark and contemplative, yet humanistic and thought-provoking.

In political affairs, Tišma often publicly supported and acted in favor of pro-democratic movements in Serbia, although he was reluctant to openly join any political organization. In 1993, as a sign of disagreement with Slobodan Milošević's regime and increasing nationalist hysteria in the country, he left Serbia and lived in self-imposed exile in France until 1996. He died in 2003, aged 79, in Novi Sad.

His works have been translated into about 20 languages. Among other awards, he received the Novi Sad October Award (1966), the NIN Award for best novel of the year (for The Use of Man, 1976), the Andrić Prize (1979), the Austrian State Prize for European Literature (1995), and the French National Order of Merit (1997).

== Bibliography ==
=== Novels ===
- Za crnom devojkom (1969). After a Black-Haired Girl
- Knjiga o Blamu (1972). The Book of Blam, trans. Michael Henry Heim (Harcourt, 1998; New York Review Books, 2016).
- Upotreba čoveka (1976). The Use of Man, trans. Ian Johnson (Harcourt, 1988) and Bernard Johnson (Faber and Faber, 1990; New York Review Books, 2014).
- Begunci (1981). Fugitives
- Vere i zavere (1983). Faith and Treason
- Kapo (1987). Kapo, trans. Richard Williams (Harcourt, 1993; New York Review Books, 2020).
- Široka vrata (1989). The Wide Door
- Koje volimo (1990). Those We Love

=== Collections of short stories ===
- Krivice (1965). Guilts
- Nasilje (1965). Violence
- Mrtvi ugao (1973). The Dead Angle
- Povratak miru (1977). Return to the Peace
- Škola bezbožništva (1978). School of Atheism
- Hiljadu i druga noć (1987). A Thousand and Second Night

=== Poetry ===
- Naseljeni svet (1956). Inhabited World
- Krčma (1961). Pub

=== Other ===
- Drugde (1963). Elsewhere, travels
- Šta sam govorio (1996). What I Spoke, interviews
- Dnevnik 1942-2001 (2001). Diary, interviews
