= Aleksandar Gatalica =

Serbian writer, critic and translator (born 1964)

- Александар Гаталица
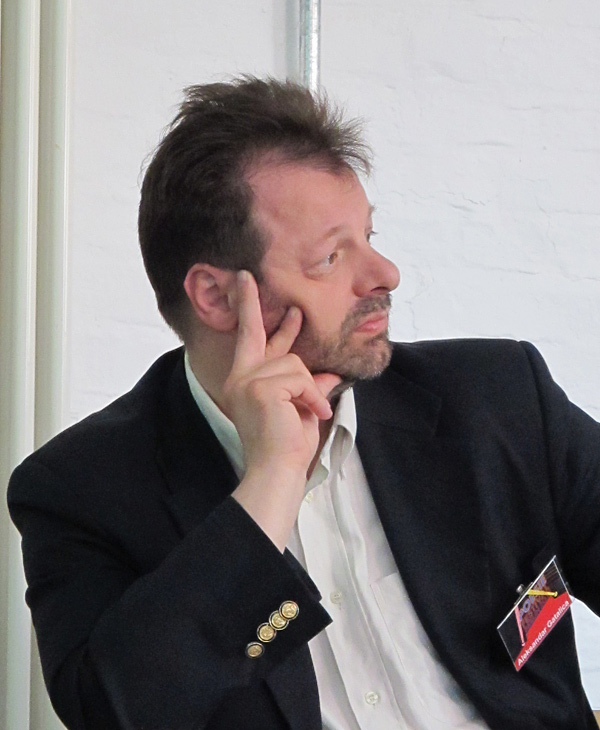
- Born: Belgrade, Yugoslavia
- Education: University of Belgrade
- Occupation: writer
- Writing career
- Language: Serbian
- Notable awards: NIN Award; 2012 Veliki rat

Aleksandar Gatalica (Serbian Cyrillic: Александар Гаталица; born 1964) is a Serbian writer, critic and translator, best known for his novel The Great War, for which he won the NIN Award for best Serbian novel of the year. His works has been translated in more than ten languages.

== Biography ==
Gatalica was born in 1964 in Belgrade, where he graduated world literature with Old Greek at Faculty of Philology, University of Belgrade.

He worked as editor of the Pages on world literature (Danas daily), editor of Blic knjiga publishing company, editor of Serbian PEN Centre editions, art director of Madlenianum Opera and Theatre and first president of National Library of Serbia Foundation. Gatalica is also noted as editor of several anthologies in Serbian and other languages.

A noted translator, Gatalica translated works of authors such as Aeschylus, Sophocles, Euripides and pioneerly translatated great part of ancient poets, such as: Sappho, Mimnermus, Solon, Archilochus, Hipponax and Anacreon.

He has written music critique for many newspapers and published several books of music critique.

In 2016 Gatalica conducted a series of interviews with contemporary Serbian authors for Radio Television of Serbia.

== Works ==
- Rubinstein vs Horowitz, 1999.
- The Life Lines, 1993.
- Govorite li klasični?, 1994.
- Reversed Faces, 1995.
- The Mimicries, 1996.
- Crno i belo, 1998.
- The Century, 1999.
- The End, 2001.
- The golden Era of Pianism, 2002.
- Euripides death, 2002.
- Belgrade for Foreigners, 2004.
- Kvadratura nota, 2004.
- A Dialog with Delusions, 2006.
- Diary of Conquered Architects, 2006.
- The Inivisible, 2008.
- Anegdote o velikim muzičarima, 2010.
- The Great War, 2012.
- Poslednji Argonaut, 2018.
- Sonata for A Malevolent Man
- Two headed Pin

=== Translations ===
- Aeschylus - Prometej u okovima
- Sophocles - Gospodar Edip,
- Euripides - Alkesta, 1993.
- Umetnička lirika stare Grčke, 1994.
- Dvojica jambičara, 1998.
- Euripides - Ifigenijina smrt u Aulidi, 2002.
- Helenska poezija, 2003.
- Euripid izabrane drame, 2007.
- Sophocles - Gospodar Edip i Edip na Kolonu, 2011.

== Awards ==
- Miloš Crnjanski Award
- Giorgio La Pira Award
- Andrić Award
- NIN Award
- Meša Selimović Award
- Most widely read book in National Library of Serbia in 2013, and 2014
- Umberto Saba Award
- Stevan Sremac Award
- Dejan Medaković Award
- Award Kočićevo pero
- Nagrada Udruženja dramskih umetnika
- Liplje Award
