= Nikola T. Kašiković =

Nikola Kašiković
- Никола Кашиковић
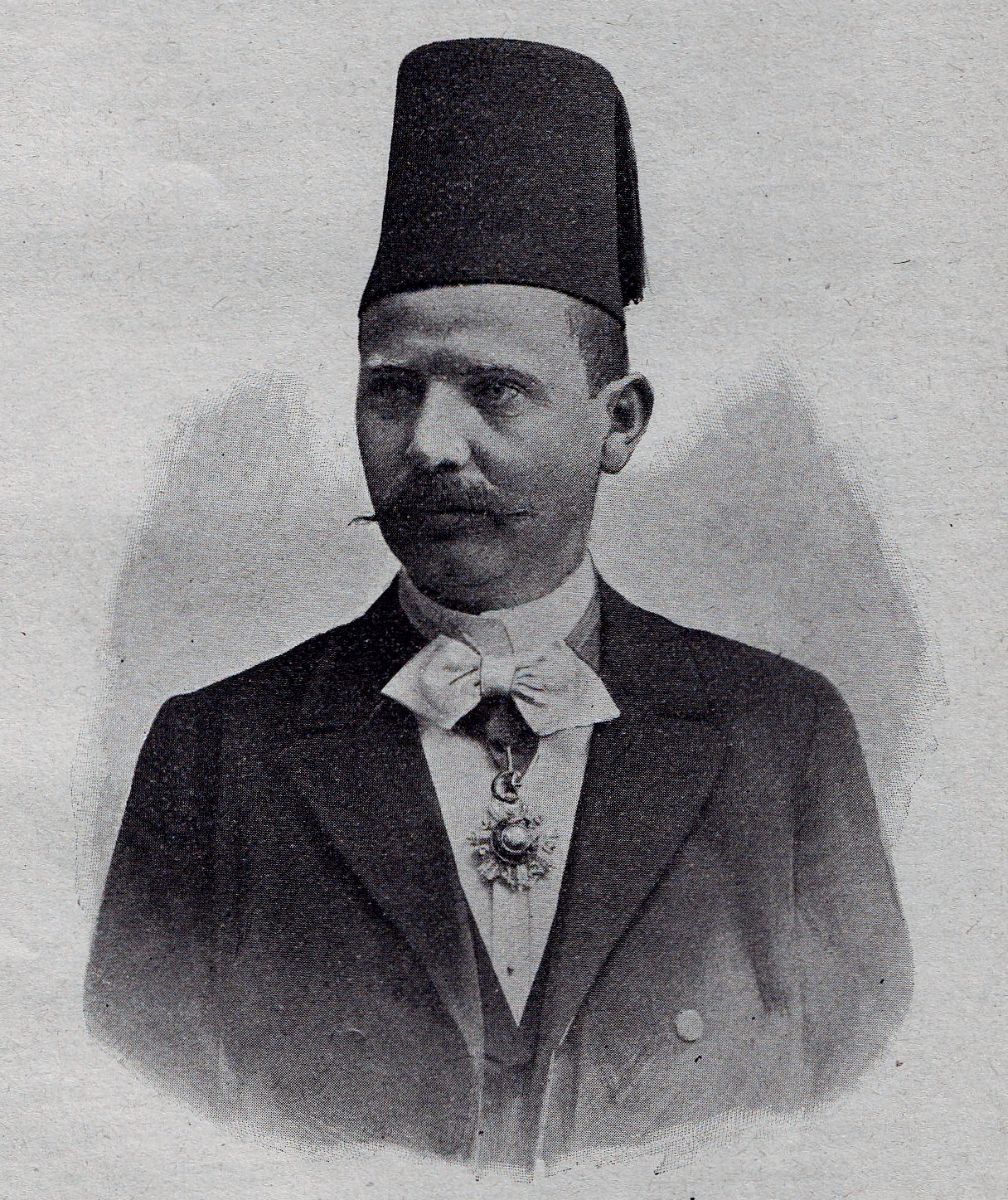
- Born: 4 December 1861; Sarajevo, Ottoman Empire
- Died: 22 May 1927 (aged 65); Sarajevo, Kingdom of Serbs, Croats, and Slovenes
- Occupations: Writer, educator

Nikola T. Kašiković (Sarajevo, Ottoman Empire, 4 December 1861 – Sarajevo, Kingdom of Serbs, Croats, and Slovenes, 22 May 1927) was a Bosnian Serb writer, educator, editor of Bosanska Vila and a collector of folk songs.

His editorial policies brought prestige and recognition to his journal in Sarajevo at the time when Bosnia and Herzegovina was under the Turkish and Austrian yoke.

== Biography ==
He taught at Miss Irby Teachers’ College, established in Sarajevo in 1869 by English Protestant humanitarian Adeline Paulina Irby. There he met Stoja Zdjelarević and married her in 1886.

Nikola T. Kašiković went on to become one of Bosnia and Herzegovina’s most important cultural figures. Under the auspices of the Serbian Teachers Association in Sarajevo in 1885, Kašiković and three other teachers at Miss Irby Teachers' College—Bozidar Nikašinović (b. 1863), Nikola Šumonja (1865-1927) and Stevo Kaluđerčić (1864-1948) -- founded the first Bosnian Serb literary-cultural journal, Bosanska vila (The Bosnian Muse) which was in circulation from 1885 until 1914. It rapidly became the most important journal in the country, as well as a leading cultural journal among South Slavs outside the region. Bosanska vila published folklore, poetry, short stories, translations and reported on Serbian cultural events from across the Balkans. The journal served as a forum of discussion about not yet attained goals of education and literary and artistic collaborative works by a new generation of writers, namely Aleksa Šantić, Jovan Dučić, Veljko Petrović, Vladimir Ćorović, Svetozar Ćorović, Petar Kočić, Milan Prelog and others. As such, the people involved with the journal, particularly Nikola Kašiković, were constantly under the watchful eye of the authorities, monitored wherever they went.

In 1887, Nikola T. Kašiković took over the duties of two previous editors Bozidar Nikašinović (1885-1886) and Nikola Šumonja (1886-1887), and retained the same position for the next 26 years, until the outbreak of World War I, thanks to the efforts of his wife Stoja Kašiković.

When Nikola became ill and bed-ridden in 1891, Stoja Kašiković became the journal's (Bosanska Vila) acting editor-in-chief, moving the journal’s administrative headquarters from the Serb elementary schoolhouse to the Kašiković family residence. She also received assistance from an experienced administrator, Stevo Kaluđerčić. But like other women of her time, her work went mainly unrecognized and it was Kaludjerčić’s name that appeared on the 1891 masthead of each issue of the journal as editor-in-chief. After Nikola’s recovery the following year, Stoja continued to act as his trusted co-editor and collaborator, also contributing on occasion. Since a great number of subscribers lived in Belgrade, Nikola and Stoja were in correspondence with the intellectual crowd of that city, namely Milorad Pavlović and Isidora Sekulić. Stoja eventually did receive public acclaim for her cultural work. In 1910, historian and friend of the Kašiković couple, Vladimir Ćorović presented a comprehensive history of Bosanska Vila in his address on the occasion of the 25th anniversary of its founding. Nikola and Stoja Kašiković received decorations from the governments of Serbia and Montenegro. Also, the couple received a laurel wreath which was presented by the Philanthropic Organization of Serbian Ladies (Kolo srspski sestara), as a gesture of their appreciation.

== Works ==
- Narodne pjesme iz zbirke Nikole T. Kašikovića
- Narodno blago: zbirka Nikole Kašikovića, 1-2 - Volume 1
