= Bileća =

Bileća Билећа
- Town and municipality
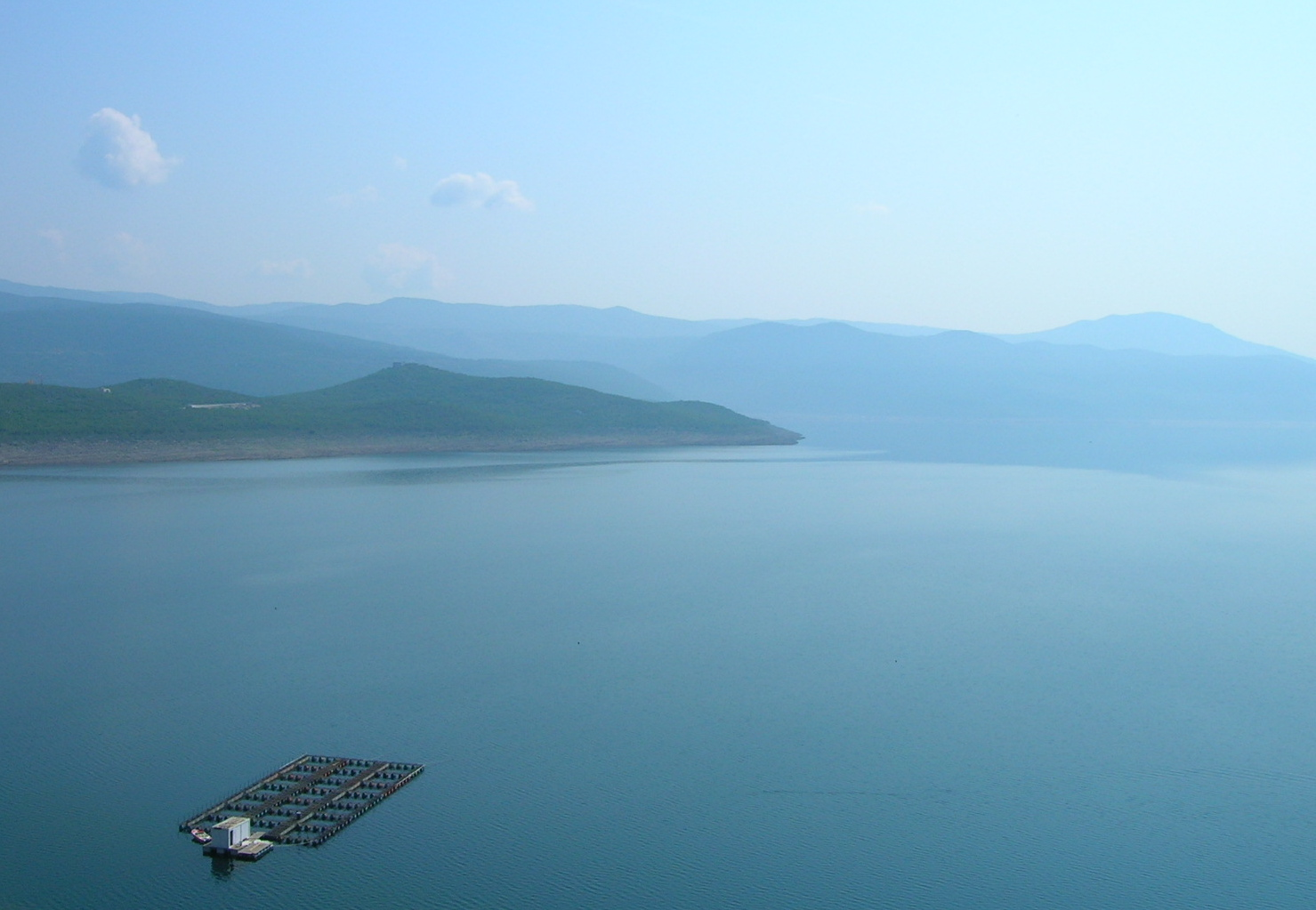
- Bileća lake

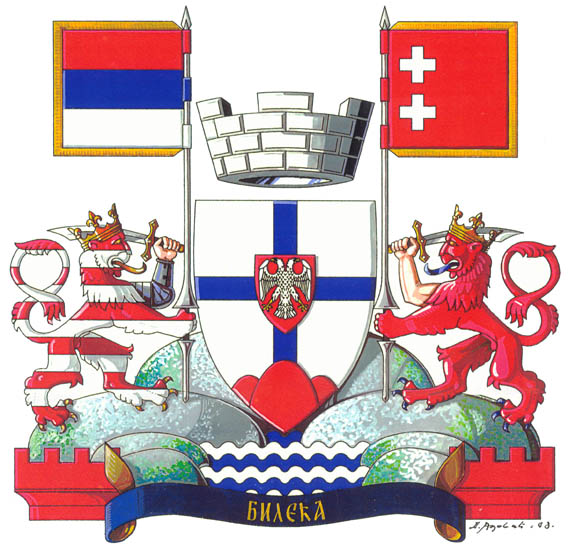
- Flag Coat of arms

- Location of Bileća within Bosnia and Herzegovina

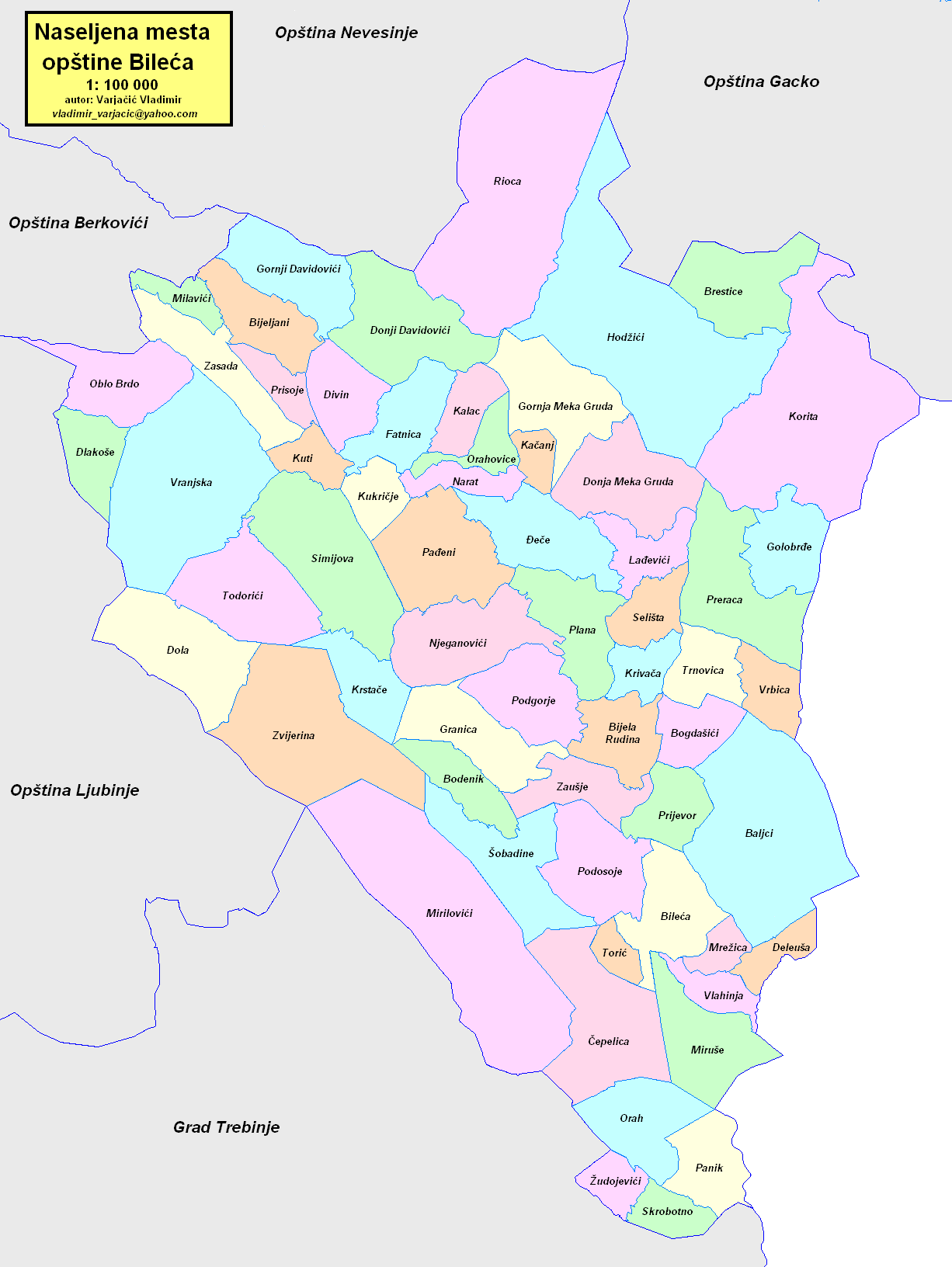
- Coordinates: 42°52′30″N 18°25′40″E
- Country: Bosnia and Herzegovina
- Entity: Republika Srpska
- Geographical region: Herzegovina
- Settlements: 61 (2013.)

Government
  - Municipal mayor: Miodrag Parežanin (SNSD)
  - Municipality: 632.33 km^{2} (244.14 sq mi)

Population (2013 census)
  - Town: 8,220
  - Municipality: 10,807
  - Municipality density: 17.091/km^{2} (44.265/sq mi)
- Time zone: UTC+1 (CET)
  - Summer (DST): UTC+2 (CEST)
- Area code: 59
- Website: opstinabileca.ba

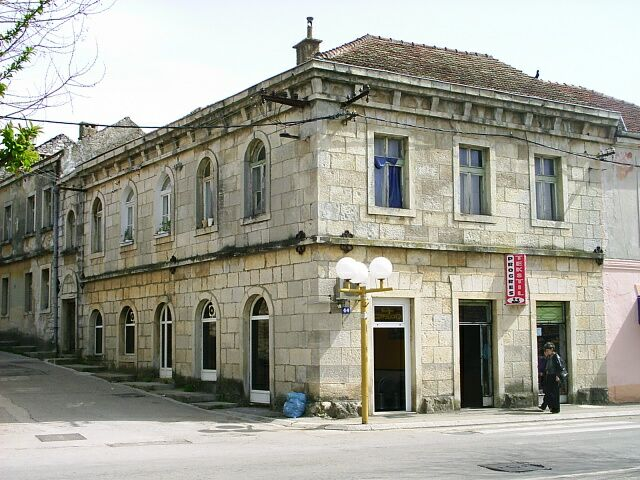
Architecture in the city centre

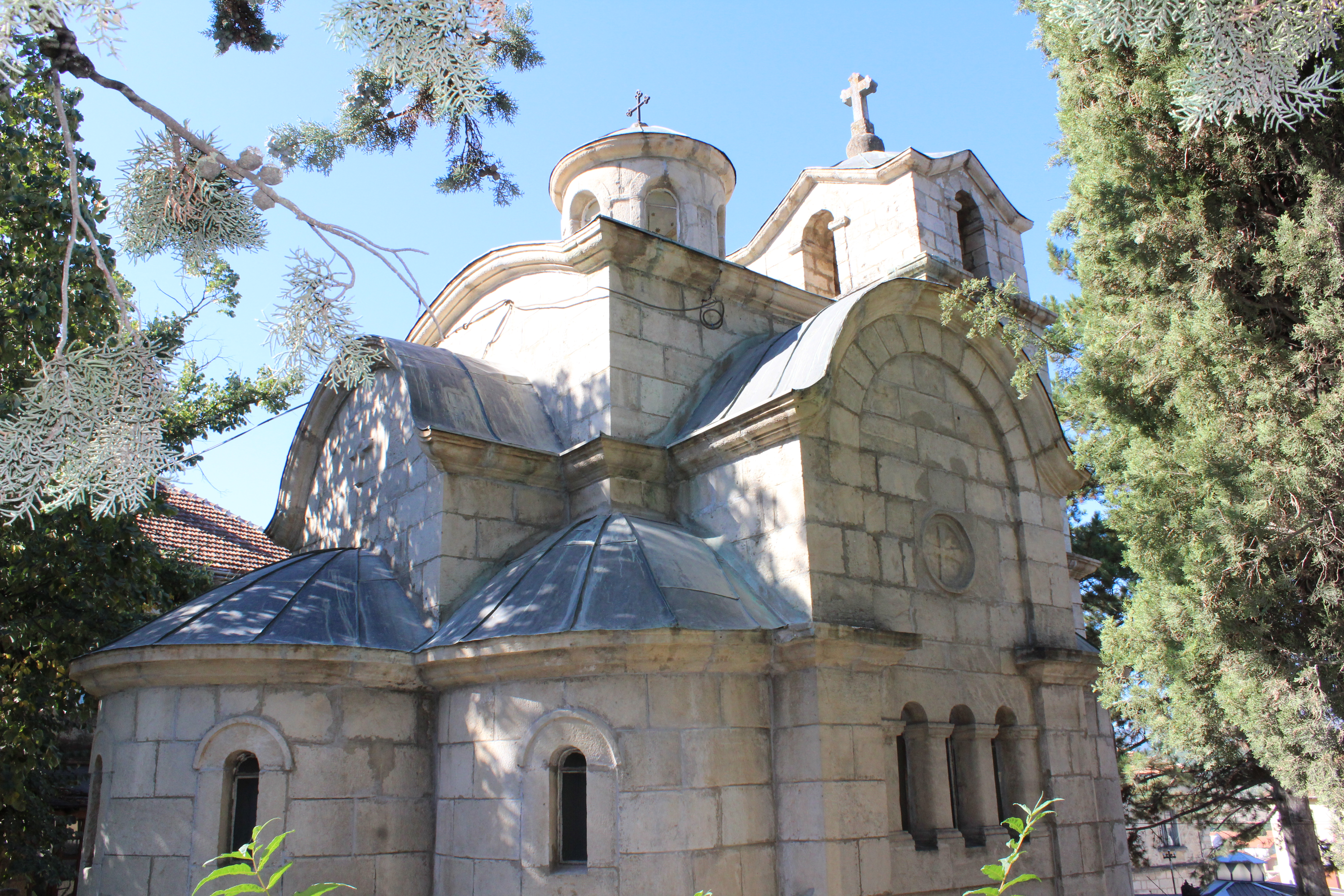
Serbian Orthodox Vidovdanska church

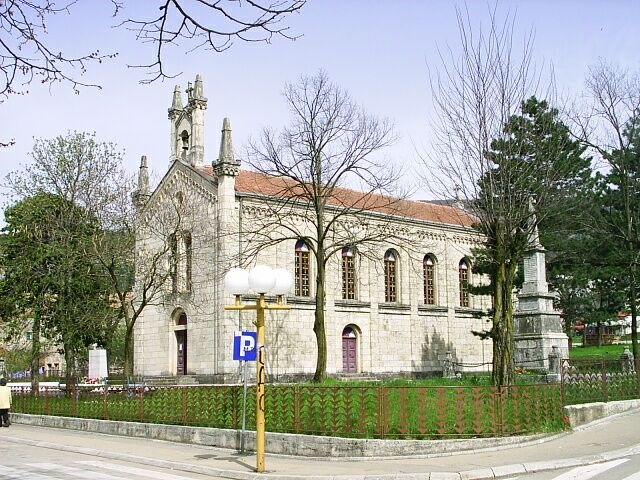
Church of Saint Sava

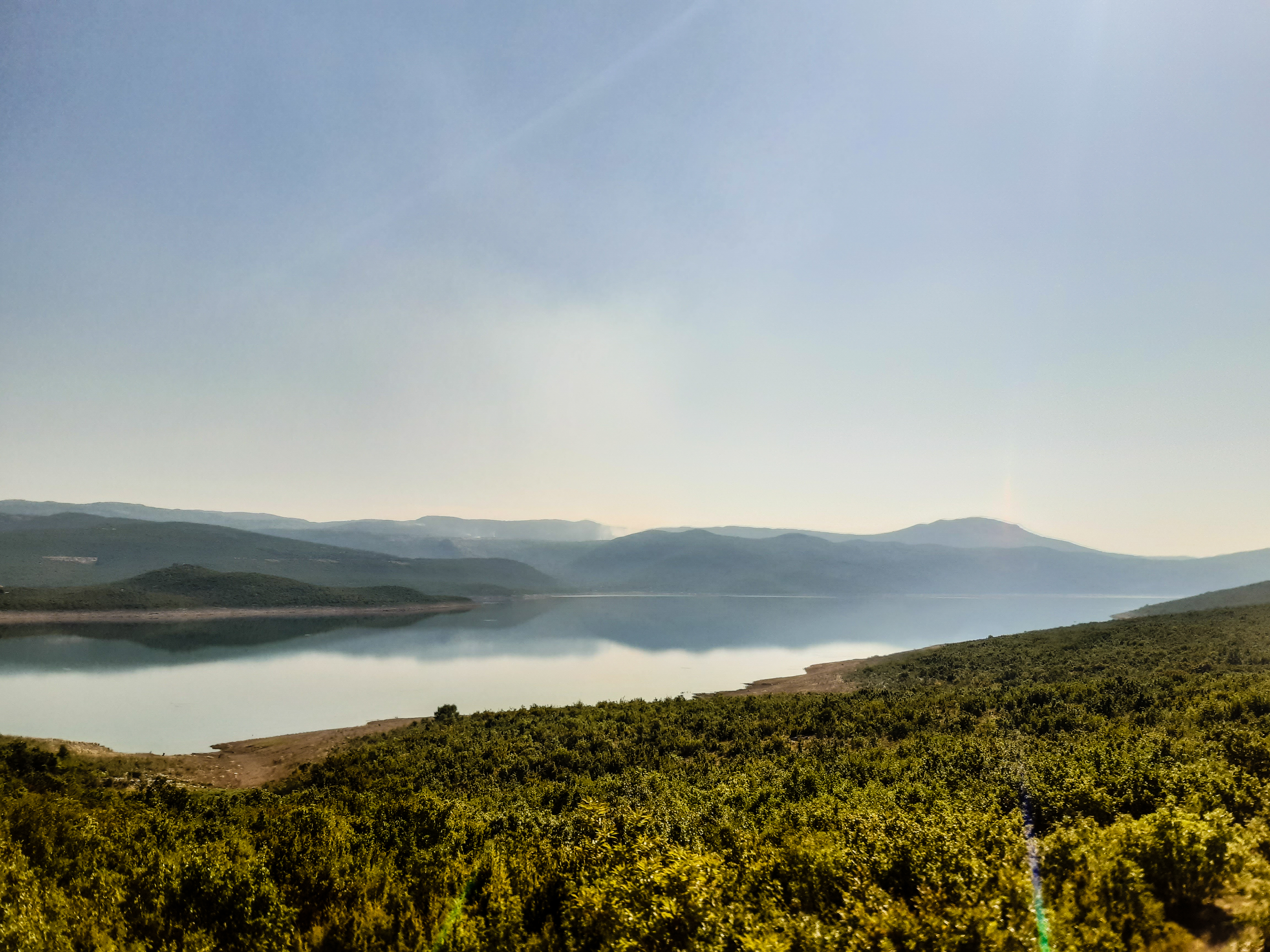
Bileća lake

Bileća (Serbian Cyrillic: Билећа) is a town and municipality in Republika Srpska, Bosnia and Herzegovina. As of 2013, the town has a population of 7,476 inhabitants, while the municipality has 10,807 inhabitants.

== History ==
The first traces of civilization in Bileća date from the Neolithic period, although archaeological sites are insufficiently explored.

During the Middle Ages, Bileća was located on the border with the župa of Vrm and the nearby Vlach necropolis, and was often mentioned as an important crossroad location for caravans on the route from Dubrovnik to Nikšić and Ključ, near Gacko. The town became part of the Bosnian state for the first time in 1373, after the defeat of Nikola Altomanović, but the first mention of the town under its present name was from 25 January 1387, while it was also mentioned as Bilechia in 1438. A document dated from 8 September 1388 mentions that the army of the duke Vlatko Vuković defeated the Turkish army at the Battle of Bileća.

The period from the 13th to the 16th century was marked by the building of a large number of stećci. There were 1724 stećak monoliths recorded in Bileća area during the 1970s, with later research suggesting a higher number. Grebenice-Bunčići site of stećak monuments near Baljci is included in the UNESCO World Heritage list.

Bileća was held by the Turks from 1466, although it was a rebellious area that was difficult to control. During Herzegovina Uprising one of the crucial battles occurred in July 1876 about 6km east of Bileća. Led by Prince Nikola, joint forces of Montenegrin and Herzegovian battalions defeated the Turks in the Battle of Vučji Do, forcing them to withdraw towards Trebinje.

The Congress of Berlin in 1878 included Bileća in the Austro-Hungarian Empire, which brought economic development to the region. The first primary school in Bileća was opened in 1880.

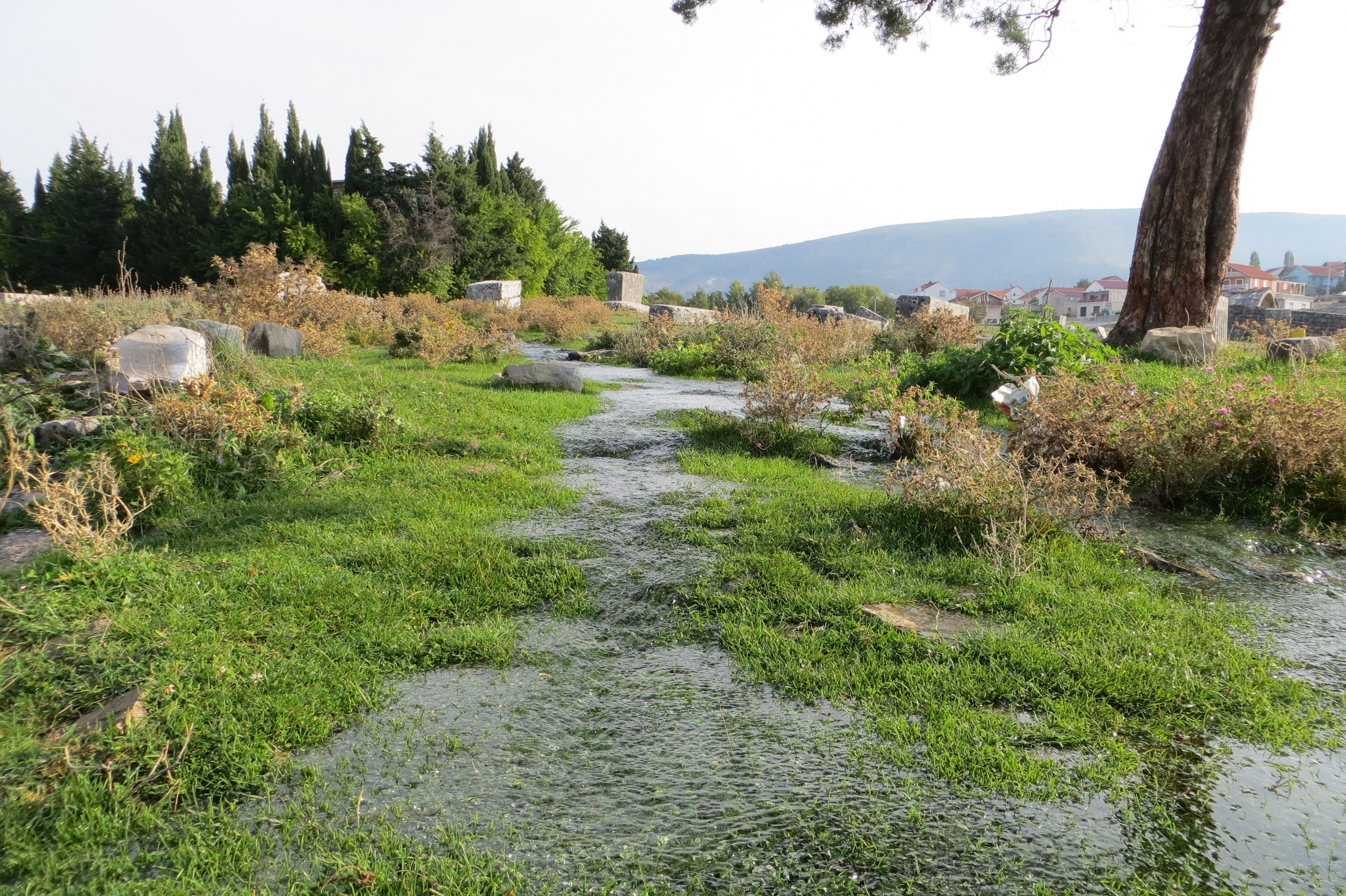
Necropolis of stećak tombstones in Bileća

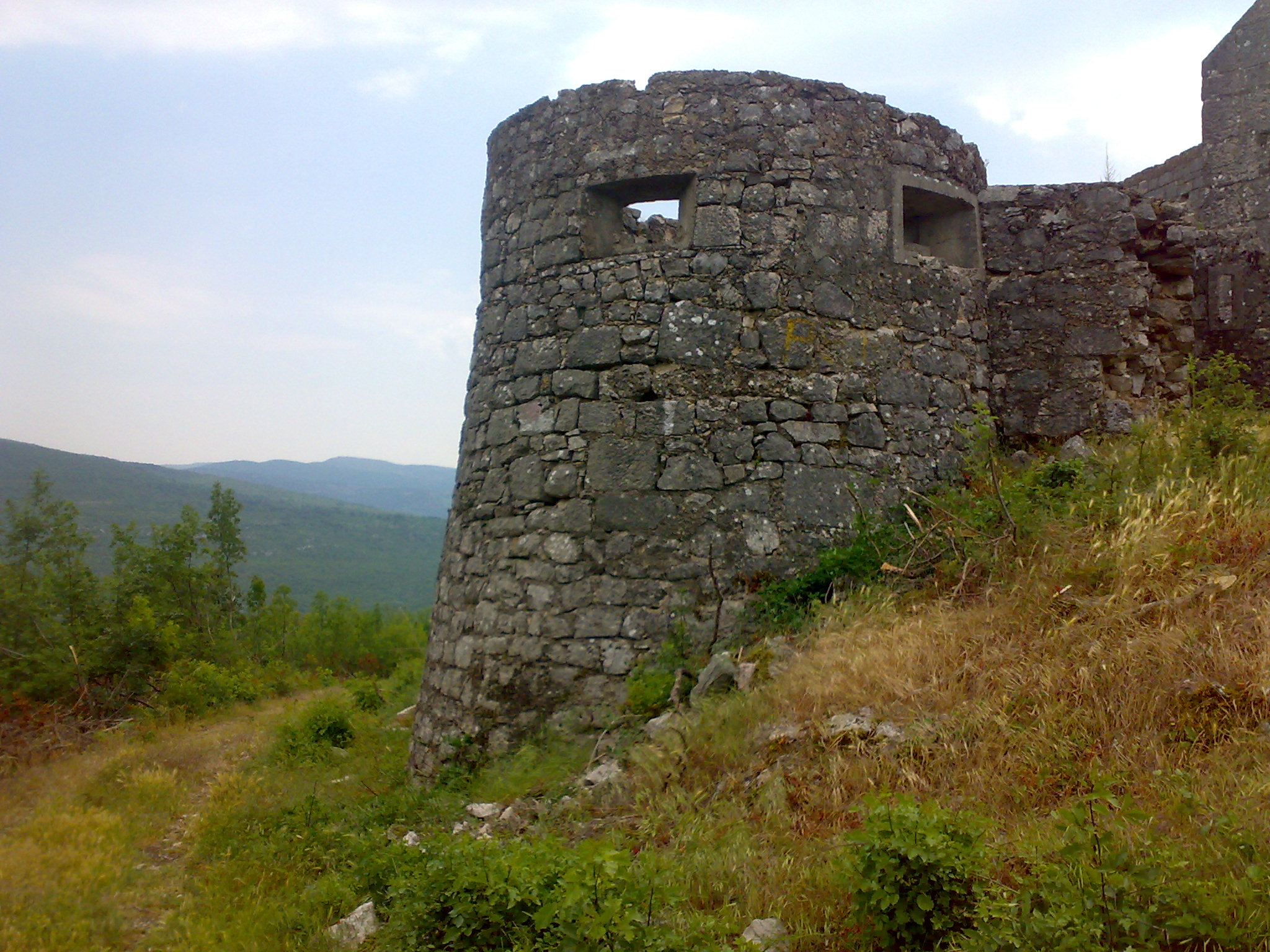
Old fortification Drakuljica

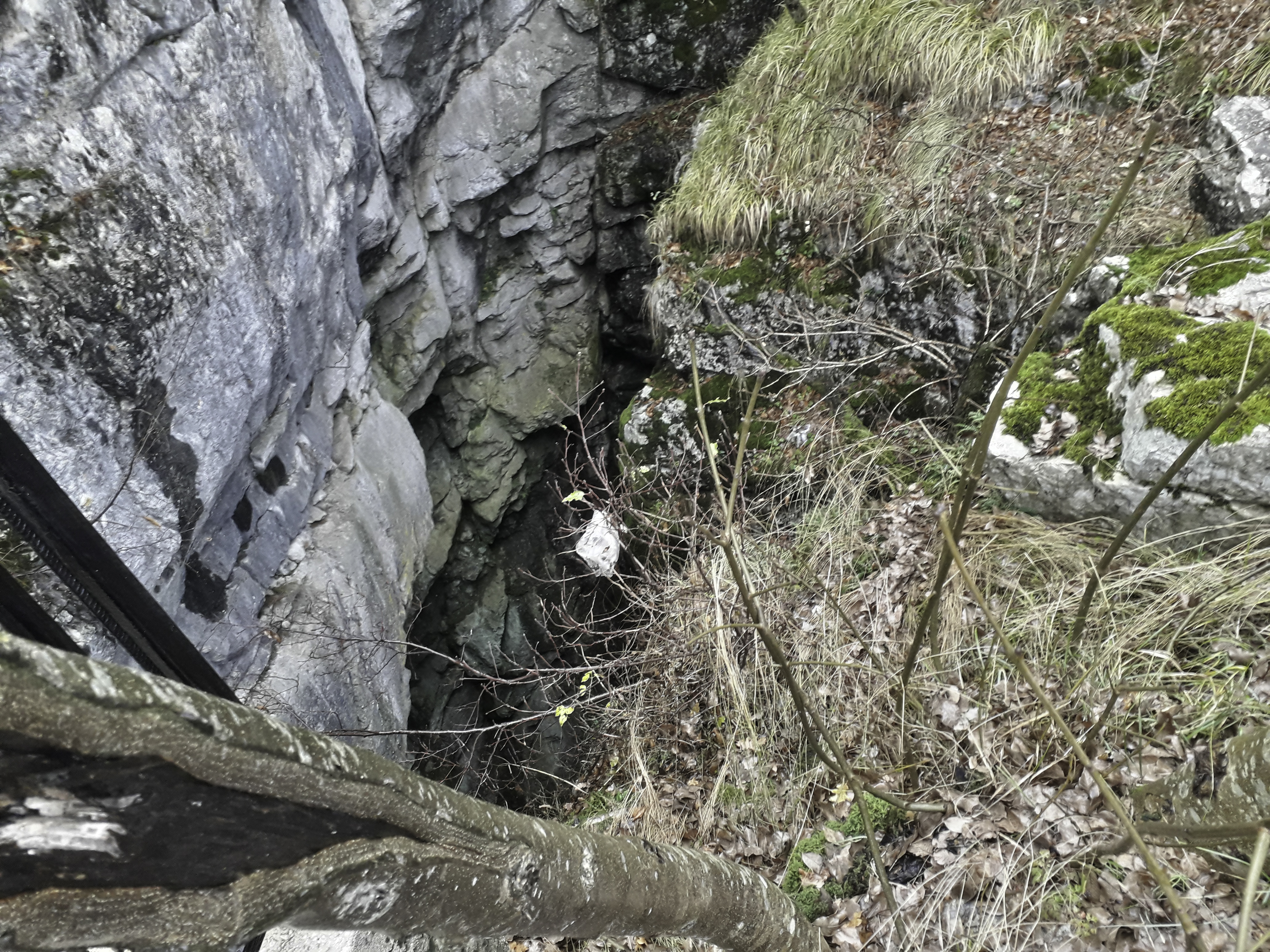
A pit in which Ustaše threw killed Serb civilians from Bileća, a part of the wider Genocide of Serbs

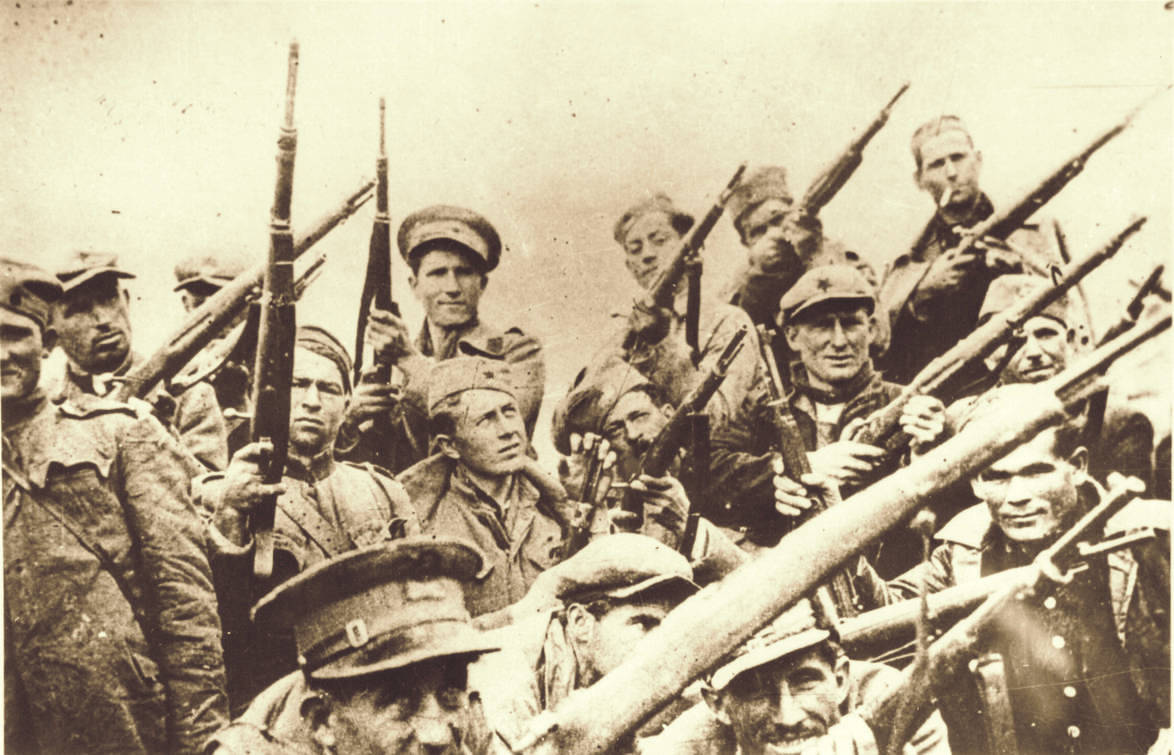
Yugoslav Partisans from Bileća

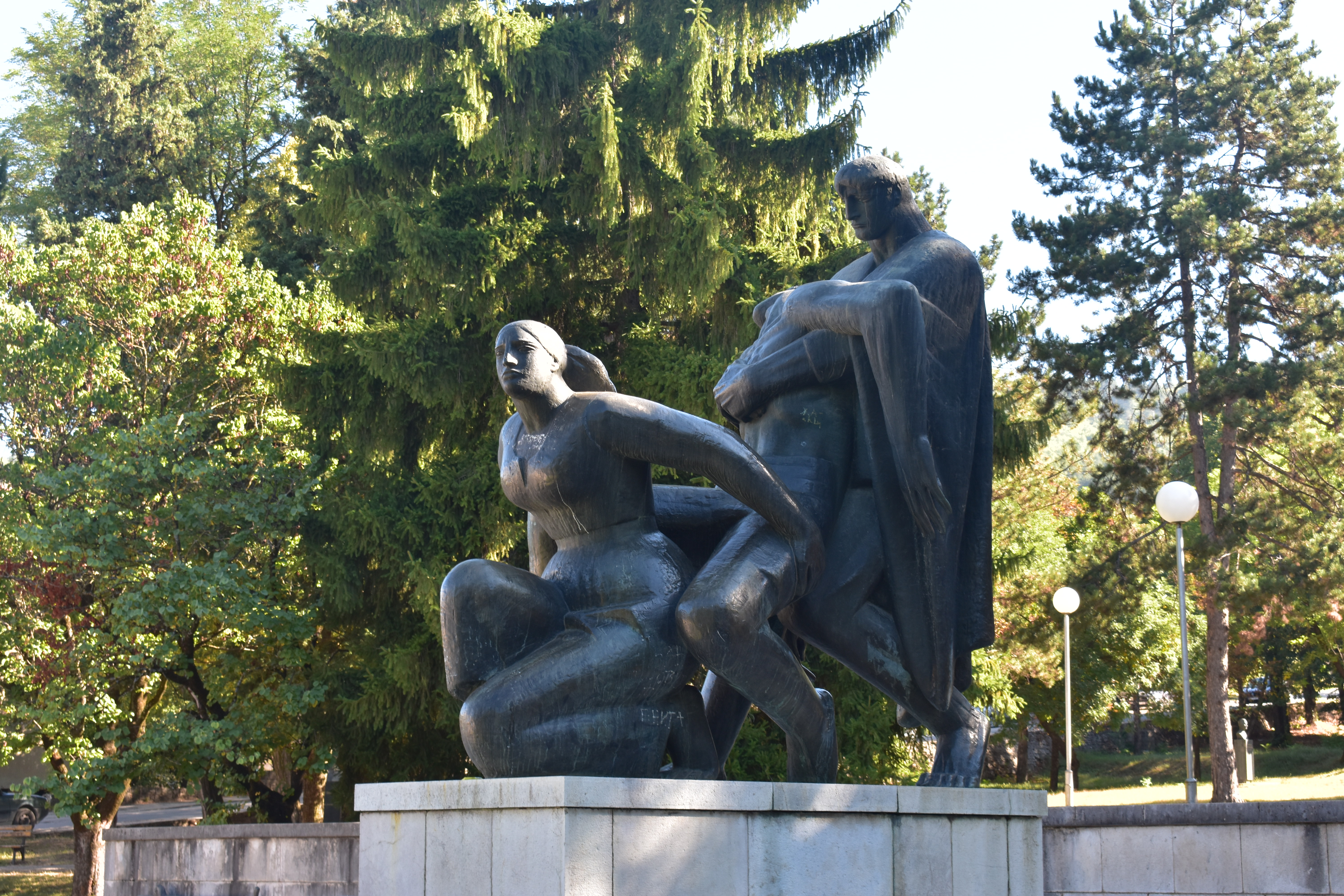
Park of People's Hero

== Settlements ==
Aside from the town of Bileća, the municipality includes the following settlements:

- Baljci
- Bijela Rudina
- Bijeljani
- Bodenik
- Bogdašići
- Brestice
- Čepelica
- Deleuša
- Divin
- Dlakoše
- Dola
- Donja Meka Gruda
- Donji Davidovići
- Đeče
- Fatnica
- Golobrđe
- Gornja Meka Gruda
- Gornji Davidovići
- Granica
- Hodžići
- Kačanj
- Kalac
- Korita
- Krivača
- Krstače
- Kukričje
- Kuti
- Lađevići
- Milavići
- Mirilovići
- Miruše
- Mrežica
- Narat
- Njeganovići
- Oblo Brdo
- Orah
- Orahovice
- Pađeni
- Panik
- Plana
- Podgorje
- Podosoje
- Preraca
- Prijevor
- Prisoje
- Rioca
- Selišta
- Simijova
- Skrobotno
- Šobadine
- Todorići
- Torič
- Trnovica
- Vlahinja
- Vranjska
- Vrbica
- Zasada
- Zaušje
- Zvijerina
- Žudojevići

== Demographics ==
=== Population ===
Population of settlements – Bileća municipality
	Settlement	1948.	1953.	1961.	1971.	1981.	1991.	2013.
	Total	13,531	14.026	14,125	13,444	13,199	13,284	10,807
1	Baljci						417	293
2	Bileća	1,270	1,563	2,491	4,033	5,763	7,568	7,476
3	Podosoje						971	1,055

=== Ethnic composition ===
According to the 1910 census, the absolute majority in the Bileća municipality were Orthodox Christians (82.27%). According to the Kingdom of Yugoslavia 1931 population census, the majority was held by Orthodox Christians at 81.27%.

Ethnic composition – Bileća town
	2013.	1991.	1981.	1971.
Total	7,616 (100,0%)	7,568 (100,0%)	5,763 (100,0%)	4,033 (100,0%)
Serbs	7,500 (98,5%)	5,619 (74,25%)	3,882 (67,36%)	2,810 (69,68%)
Bosniaks	7 (0,1%)	1,290 (17,05%)	841 (14,59%)	828 (20,53%)
Others	90 (1,2%)	411 (5,431%)	26 (0,451%)	36 (0,893%)
Yugoslavs		209 (2,762%)	651 (11,30%)	64 (1,587%)
Croats	19 (0,2%)	39 (0,515%)	42 (0,729%)	82 (2,033%)
Montenegrins			286 (4,963%)	190 (4,711%)
Macedonians			23 (0,399%)	14 (0,347%)
Albanians			7 (0,121%)	1 (0,025%)
Slovenes			5 (0,087%)	8 (0,198%)

Ethnic composition – Bileća municipality
	2013.	1991.	1981.	1971.
Total	10,807 (100,0%)	13,284 (100,0%)	13,199 (100,0%)	13,444 (100,0%)
Serbs	10,646 (98,51%)	10,628 (80,01%)	10,190 (77,20%)	10,880 (80,93%)
Others	114 (1,055%)	448 (3,372%)	34 (0,258%)	50 (0,372%)
Bosniaks	26 (0,241%)	1,947 (14,66%)	1,803 (13,66%)	2,079 (15,46%)
Croats	21 (0,194%)	39 (0,294%)	44 (0,333%)	82 (0,610%)
Yugoslavs		222 (1,671%)	773 (5,857%)	69 (0,513%)
Montenegrins			317 (2,402%)	261 (1,941%)
Macedonians			24 (0,182%)	14 (0,104%)
Albanians			8 (0,061%)	1 (0,007%)
Slovenes			6 (0,045%)	8 (0,060%)

== Economy ==
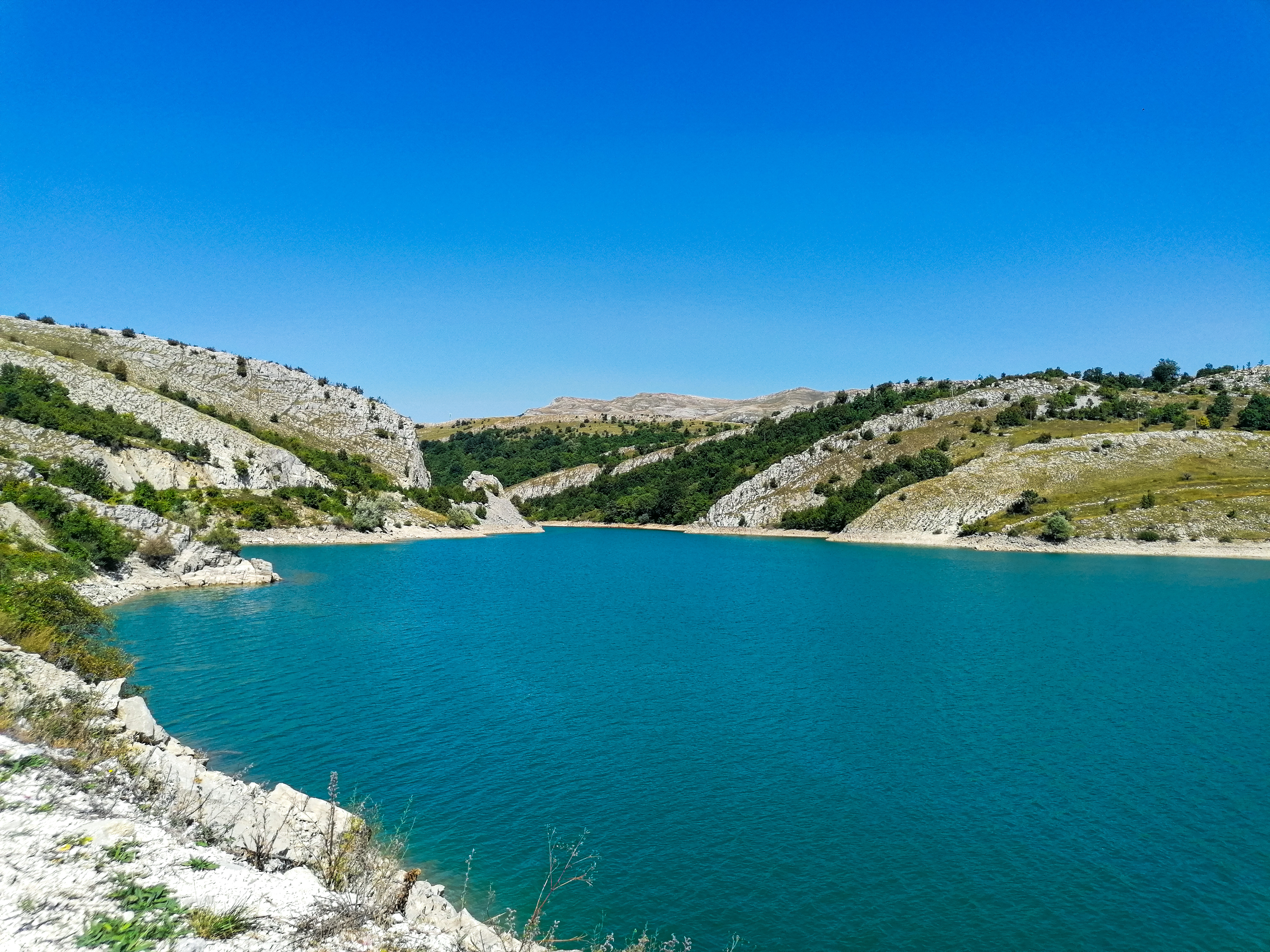
Dam on Klinje Lake

The following table gives a preview of total number of registered people employed in professional fields per their core activity (as of 2018):

Professional field	Total
Agriculture, forestry and fishing	2
Mining and quarrying	1
Manufacturing	377
Electricity, gas, steam and air conditioning supply	78
Water supply; sewerage, waste management and remediation activities	107
Construction	195
Wholesale and retail trade, repair of motor vehicles and motorcycles	267
Transportation and storage	86
Accommodation and food services	81
Information and communication	25
Financial and insurance activities	18
Real estate activities	-
Professional, scientific and technical activities	22
Administrative and support service activities	4
Public administration and defense; compulsory social security	225
Education	193
Human health and social work activities	80
Arts, entertainment and recreation	42
Other service activities	31
Total	1,834

== Sports ==
The local football club FK Hercegovac has spent one season in the country's second tier — First League of the Republika Srpska.

== Climate ==
Climate data for Bileća (1991–2020)
Month	Jan	Feb	Mar	Apr	May	Jun	Jul	Aug	Sep	Oct	Nov	Dec	Year
Mean daily maximum °C (°F)	8.9 (48.0)	10.2 (50.4)	14.3 (57.7)	16.7 (62.1)	21.1 (70.0)	26.7 (80.1)	28.1 (82.6)	30.6 (87.1)	25.6 (78.1)	17.6 (63.7)	13.8 (56.8)	9.1 (48.4)	18.6 (65.5)
Daily mean °C (°F)	3.8 (38.8)	4.9 (40.8)	7.9 (46.2)	11.4 (52.5)	16.1 (61.0)	20.8 (69.4)	23.2 (73.8)	23.2 (73.8)	17.7 (63.9)	13.3 (55.9)	8.9 (48.0)	4.8 (40.6)	13.0 (55.4)
Mean daily minimum °C (°F)	−0.5 (31.1)	−0.5 (31.1)	2.8 (37.0)	5.3 (41.5)	9.6 (49.3)	13.2 (55.8)	15.3 (59.5)	15.3 (59.5)	11.8 (53.2)	7.5 (45.5)	4.2 (39.6)	0.2 (32.4)	7.0 (44.6)
Average precipitation mm (inches)	147.8 (5.82)	149.8 (5.90)	133.5 (5.26)	120.3 (4.74)	99.8 (3.93)	76.8 (3.02)	53.5 (2.11)	58.1 (2.29)	125.1 (4.93)	179.0 (7.05)	224.2 (8.83)	198.5 (7.81)	1,566.3 (61.67)
Average precipitation days (≥ 1.0 mm)	9.8	9.9	9.5	9.7	9.5	7.6	5.1	5.2	8.0	9.4	11.1	11.2	106.2
Source: NOAA

== Notes ==
- The Diocese of Zahumlje-Herzegovina and Littoral (official site in Serbian), Serbian Orthodox Church (official site in English)
- Hydroelectric power plants on the Trebisnjica River (near Bileća)
- Lake Bileća (Bilećko jezero) is located south of the town.

== Notable people ==
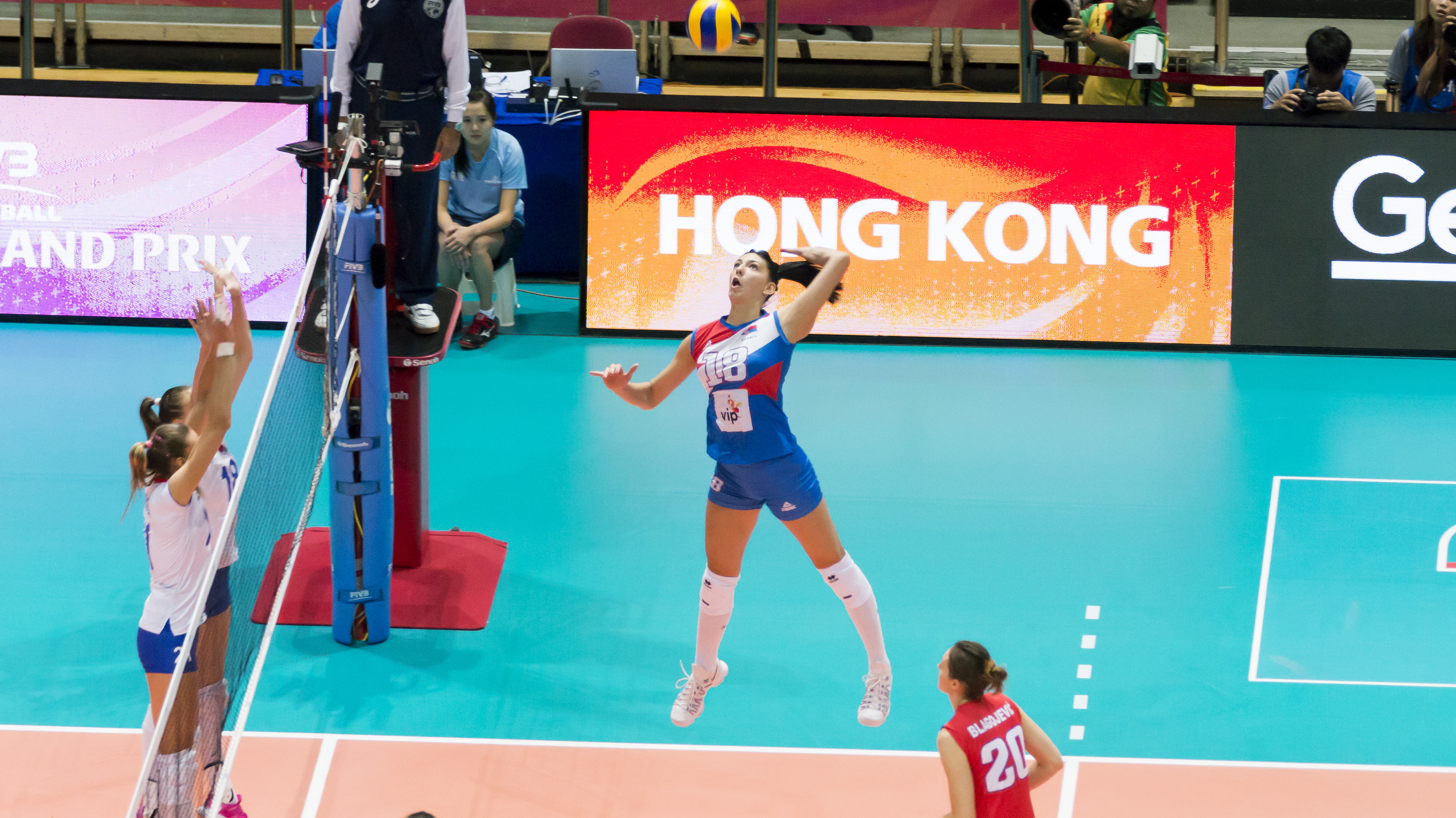
Tijana Bošković, world and European champion

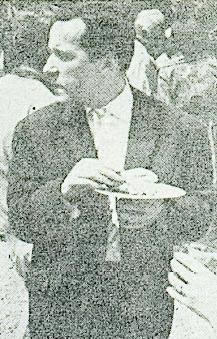
Director Dušan Vukotić won the Academy Award for Animated Short Film in 1961

- Safet Isović, singer
- Beba Selimović, singer
- Fadil Hadžić, movie director and writer
- Dušan Vukotić, Oscar for the best animated short in 1961 for Surogat
- Karlo Mijić, painter
- Jevto Dedijer, writer
- Nenad Mišanović, basketball player
- Prokopije Čokorilo, priest
- Ervin Eleskovic, Swedish tennis player
- Tijana Bošković, Serbian volleyball player, World and European champion, silver medalist at the 2016 Summer Olympics

== See also ==
- Municipalities of Republika Srpska
