= NIN Award =

Serbian literary award

- Awarded for: Best new Serbian novel
- Sponsored by: NIN magazine
- Location: Belgrade
- Country: Yugoslavia (1954–1991); Serbia and Montenegro (1992–2006); Serbia (2007–present)
- First award: 1954
- 2025 winner: Darko Tuševljaković

Highlights
- Most awards: Oskar Davičo (3)

The NIN Award (Serbian: Ninova nagrada, Нинова награда), officially the Award for Best Novel of the Year, is a Serbian (and previously Yugoslavian) literary award established in 1954 by the NIN weekly and is given annually for the best newly published novel written in Serbian (previously in Serbo-Croatian). The award is presented every year in January by a panel of writers and critics. In addition to being a highly acclaimed award capable of transforming writers' literary careers, the award is also sought after because it virtually assures bestseller status for the winning novel. The literary website complete review called it the "leading Serbian literary prize" in 2012.

Between 1954 and 1957, the award was given to the best novel published in Yugoslavia, regardless of the language, but all the novels awarded in this period were written in Serbo-Croatian language. Starting in 1958, only novels written in Serbo-Croatian were eligible. Starting in 2012, only novels written in Serbian were eligible, regardless of the place of publication.

== Winners ==
Since its inception, the award was not awarded only once, in 1959, when the jury decided that there were no candidates worthy of the award. Oskar Davičo is the only author to have won the award three times (in 1956, 1963 and 1964), and the only one to win it in two consecutive years. The only other authors to have won multiple (two) awards are Dobrica Ćosić, Živojin Pavlović, Dragan Velikić, and most recently Svetislav Basara. So far, seven women have been recipients of the award.

=== Controversies ===
In 1978, Danilo Kiš became the first laureate to return the award. He returned the award for Novel of the year 1972 and demanded his name to be deleted from the list of winners. Because he was outraged by the text about him published in NIN on 7 February 1992, Milisav Savić returned the award that was given to him just a month earlier for the year 1991.

One of the most notable non-recipients is Ivo Andrić, the only Yugoslavian Nobel Prize in Literature laureate. Andrić was candidate for the NIN award once, in 1954, with Prokleta avlija, but the jury disqualified the book as they classified it as a novella, and not a novel.

In January 2020, a group of 18 writers published an open letter calling for the boycott of the NIN award. They claimed that the jury was "professionally and morally incompetent", and protested the fact that, in their opinion, jury "was not made up of critics who systematically review Serbian novels". Among the signatories were two former winners (Vuksanović and Tabašević), one former jury member (Vladušić) and even some writers who competed that year, but were not chosen among the finalists. Jury president Teofil Pančić and former winner Filip David claimed that the signatories were part of the "nationalistic elite" and were motivated by politics. Former winner Aleksandar Gatalica joined the boycott in 2021. After all members of the jury were changed, the boycott was ended in 2024, when two of the signatories competed again, one of them (Bazdulj) even making to the finalists. Some of the signatories ended the boycott even earlier, with Franja Petrinović competing in 2020 and Laura Barna in 2023.

=== List ===
Year	Photo	Author(s)	Novel	Finalists	Ref
2025		Darko Tuševljaković	Karota	Dalibor Pejić, Balada o ubici i ubici i ubici; Laura Barna, Frau Beta; Milan Tripković, Besmrtne ludosti gospođe Kubat; Vladimir Vujović, Razgovori s Vješticom; Miloš Perišić, Opatija Svetog Vartolomeja	
2024		Marinko Arsić Ivkov	NGDL	Tanja Stupar Trifunović, Duž oštrog noža leti ptica; Borivoj Gerzić, Lutam sad mrtav svetom; Muharem Bazdulj, Limeni lijes za Zaimović Zejnu	
2023		Stevo Grabovac	Poslije zabave	Vladimir Pištalo, Pesma o tri sveta; Vladan Matijević, Pakrac; Srđan Srdić, Autosekcija; Ljubomir Koraćević, U Zemlji Franje Josifa	
2022		Danica Vukićević	Unutrašnje more	Milan Tripković, Klub istinskih stvaralaca; Goran Petrović, Papir sa vodenim znakom; Mirjana Drljević, Niko nije zaboravljen i ničega se ne sećamo; Uglješa Šajtinac, Koljka i Sašenjka; Marijana Čanak, Klara, Klarisa	
2021		Milena Marković	Deca	Ilija Đurović, Sampas; Elvedin Nezirović, Ono o čemu se ne može govoriti; Vladimir Kopicl, Španska čizma; Srđan V. Tešin, Mokrinske hronike; David Albahari, Pogovor	
2020		Svetislav Basara (2)	Kontraendorfin	Vladan Matijević, Sloboda govora; Darko Cvijetić, Što na podu spavaš; Enes Halilović, Ljudi bez grobova; Savo Stijepović, Prekrasne ruševine; Bojan Savić Ostojić, Ništa nije ničije; Ognjen Spahić, Pod oba sunca	
2019		Saša Ilić	Pas i kontrabas	Milenko Bodirogić, Po šumama i gorama; Stevo Grabovac, Mulat Albino Komarac; Slobodan Tišma, Grozota ili…; Ana Vučković, Yugoslav	
2018		Vladimir Tabašević	Zabluda Svetog Sebastijana	Branka Krilović, Prekasno; Jelena Lengold, Odustajanje; Lana Bastašić, Uhvati zeca; Saša Savanović, Deseti život; Goran Marković. Beogradski trio	
2017		Dejan Atanacković	Luzitanija	Jovica Aćin, Srodnici; Mira Otašević, Gorgone; David Albahari, Danas je sreda; Srđan Srdić, Srebrna magla pada	
2016		Ivana Dimić	Arzamas	Vladislav Bajac, Hronika sumnje; Vladan Matijević, Susret pod neobičnim okolnostima; Vladimir Tabašević, Pa kao	
2015		Dragan Velikić (2)	Islednik	Milisav Savić, La Sans Pareille; Svetislav Basara, Anđeo atentata; Dana Todorović, Park Logovskoj; Vule Žurić, Republika Ćopić; Ljubica Arsić, Rajska vrata	
2014		Filip David	Kuća sećanja i zaborava (The House of Memory and Oblivion)	Oto Horvat, Sabo je stao; David Albahari, Životinjsko carstvo	
2013		Goran Gocić	Tai (Thai)	Slobodan Vladušić, Mi, izbrisani; Silvana Hadži-Đokić, Zlatno doba; Sonja Atanasijević, Vazdušni ljudi; Mileta Prodanović, Arkadija	
2012		Aleksandar Gatalica	Veliki rat (The Great War)	Mira Otašević, Zoja; Drago Kekanović, Veprovo srce; Katarina Brajović, Štampar i Veronika; Ivančica Đerić, Nesreća i stvarne potrebe; Laslo Blašković, Posmrtna maska	
2011		Slobodan Tišma	Bernardijeva soba	Franja Petrinović, Almaški kružoci lečenih mesečara; David Albahari, Kontrolni punkt; Svetislav Basara, Mein Kampf; Voja Čolanović, Oda manjem zlu; Uglješa Šajtinac, Sasvim skromni darovi	
2010		Gordana Ćirjanić	Ono što oduvek želiš	Radovan Beli Marković, Gospođa Olga; Veselin Marković, Mi različiti; Vladan Matijević, Vrlo malo svetlosti; Goran Petrović, Ispod tavanice koja se ljuspa; Zoran Petrović, Kamen blizanac	
2009		Grozdana Olujić	Glasovi u vetru	Rajko Vasić, Prsti ludih očiju; Zvonko Karanović, Tri slike pobede; Žarko Komanin, Ljetopis vječnosti; Sandra Petrušić, Taoci; Đorđe Pisarev, A ako umre pre nego što se probudi; Dejan Stojiljković, Konstantinovo raskršće; Mirjana Urošević, PARK carmen Machado	
2008		Vladimir Pištalo	Tesla, portret među maskama (Tesla, a Portrait with Masks)	Radoslav Petković, Savršeno sećanje na smrt; Vladislav Bajac, Hamam Balkanija; Laura Barna, Moja poslednja glavobolja; Aleksandar Gatalica, Nevidljivi; Svetislav Basara, Dnevnik Marte Koen	
2007		Dragan Velikić	Ruski prozor (The Russian Window)	Gordana Ćirjanić, Poljubac; Draško Miletić, pH roman; Vladimir Kecmanović, Feliks	
2006		Svetislav Basara	Uspon i pad Parkinsonove bolesti (The Rise and Fall of Parkinson's Disease)	Srđan Valjarević, Komo; Zoran Živković, Most; Zvonko Karanović, Četiri zida i grad; Mirjana Mitrović, Emilija Leta	
2005		Miro Vuksanović	Semolj zemlja	David Albahari, Pijavice; Sanja Domazet, Ko plače; Saša Ilić, Berlinsko okno; Milica Mićić Dimovska, Utočošte; Goran Milašinović, Apsint; Mirjana Novaković, Johann's 501	
2004		Vladimir Tasić	Kiša i hartija	Svetislav Basara, Srce zemlje; Radovan Beli Marković, Orkestar na pedale	
2003		Vladan Matijević	Pisac izdaleka	Dragan Velikić, Dosije Domaševski; Goran Milašinović, Camera obscura; Ana Vučković, Epoha lipsa juče; Branko Brđanin, Mihail; Gordana Ćirjanić, Kuća u Puertu; Radovan Beli Marković, Devet belih oblaka	
2002		Mladen Markov	Ukop oca	Daniel Kovač, Logika reke, pruge i otpada; Radovan Beli Marković, Knez Miškin u Belom Valjevu; Dobrilo Nenadić, Sablja grofa Vronskog; Nenad Teofilović, Klopka	
2001		Zoran Ćirić	Hobo	Radovan Beli Marković, Poslednja ruža Kolubare; Dragan Velikić, Slučaj Bremen; Veselin Marković, Izranjanje; David Albahari, Svetski putnik; Danilo Nikolić, Jesenja svila; Vladimir Tasić, Oproštajni dar; Milorad Grujić, Bog Vadraca i Madžara; Eliezer Papo, Sarajevska megila; Đorđe Pisarev, Pod senkom zmaja	
2000		Goran Petrović	Sitničarnica "Kod srećne ruke" (At the "Lucky Hand" aka the Sixty-nine Drawers)	Svetislav Basara, Kratkodnevica; Radovan Beli Marković, Limunacija u Ćelijama; Miro Vuksanović, Semolj gora; Strahinja Kastratović, Klen na vrbovom prutu; Mirjana Novaković, Strah i njegov sluga; Vladimir Pištalo, Milenijum u Beogradu	
1999		Maksimilijan Erenrajh-Ostojić	Karakteristika	Ratomir Damjanović, Sančova verzija; Milovan Danojlić, Balada o siromaštvu; Vojislav Despotov, Drvodelja iz Nabisala; Momo Kapor, Lep dan za umiranje; Nikola Milošević, Nit miholjskog leta; Milorad Pavić, Kutija za pisanje; Zoran Ćirić, Prisluškivanje	
1998		Danilo Nikolić	Fajront u Grgetegu	Vladislav Bajac, Druid iz Sindiduna; Rade Kuzmanović, Golf; Dobrilo Nenadić, Despot i žrtva; Aleksandar Petrov, Kao zlato u vatri; Ivana Hadži-Popović, Sezona trešanja	
1997		Milovan Danojlić	Oslobodioci i izdajnici	Svetislav Basara, Looney Tunes	
1996		David Albahari	Mamac (Bait)	Milica Mićić Dimovska, Poslednji zanosi MSS; Miroslav Josić Višnjić, Svetovno trojstvo; Boško Krstić, Kaštel Beringer; Voja Čolanović, Džepna kob	
1995		Svetlana Velmar-Janković	Bezdno	Dragan Velikić, Severni zid; Danilo Nikolić, Kraljica zabave; David Albahari, Snežni čovek	
1994		Vladimir Arsenijević	U potpalublju (In the Hold)	Milovan Đilas, Izgubljene bitke; Vuk Drašković, Noć đenerala; Dragoslav Mihailović, Gori Morava; Ivan Ivanović, Vojvoda od Leskovca	
1993		Radoslav Petković	Sudbina i komentari (Destiny, Annotated)	Vidosav Stevanović, Ostrvo Balkan; Goran Petrović, Atlas opisan nebom; Slobodan Selenić, Ubistvo s predumišljajem; Pavle Ugrinov, Sapun od cveća; Milomir Đukanović, Američki eksperiment	
1992		Živojin Pavlović (2)	Lapot	Miroslav Josić Višnjić, Pristup u kap i seme; Antonije Isaković, Miran zločin; Danko Popović, Udovice; Miroslav Savićević, Kraj stoleća Kasiopeje; Svetislav Basara, Mongolski bedeker	
1991		Milisav Savić	Hleb i strah	Žarko Radaković, Tibingen; Boba Blagojević, Skerletna luda; Milorad Pavić, Unutrašnja strana vetra; Dragan Velikić, Astragan; Berislav Kosijer, Bezbožnici I-II; Momčilo Selić, Izgon	
1990		Miroslav Josić Višnjić	Odbrana i propast Bodroga u sedam burnih godišnjih doba	Svetlana Velmar Janković, Lagum; Svetislav Basara, Na Gralovom tragu; Milisav Savić, Ćup komitskog vojvode; Mirjana Mitrović, Autoportret sa Milenom; Đorđe Pisarev, Gotska priča	
1989		Vojislav Lubarda	Vaznesenje	Vladislav Bajac, Knjiga o bambusu; Dževad Karahasan, Istočni divan; Miroslav Toholj, Stid; Nedjeljko Fabrio, Berenikina kosa	
1988		Dubravka Ugrešić	Forsiranje romana reke (Fording the Stream of Consciousness)	Ivan Aralica, Asmodejev šal; Dragan Velikić, Via Pula; Milenko Vučetić, Bežanje od sreće; Zvonimir Majdak, Starac; Borislav Pekić, Atlantida; Miroslav Savićević, Priča o Kosovskom boju	
1987		Voja Čolanović	Zebnja na rasklapanje	Ivan Aralica, Okvir za mržnju; Slavenka Drakulić, Hologrami straha; Branko Letić, Povratak u tuđinu; Judita Šalgo, Trag kočenja	
1986		Vidosav Stevanović	Testament	Ivan Aralica, Graditelj Svratišta; Svetislav Basara, Napuklo ogledalo; Dobrica Ćosić, Otpadnik; Milovan Danojlić, Dragi moj Petroviću; Sveta Lukić, Ratne igre u Vrbovcu; Borislav Pekić, Zlatno runo vol. 6-7; Derviš Sušić, Nevakat; Petar Šegedin, Vjetar; Pavle Ugrinov, Otac i sin	
1985		Živojin Pavlović	Zid smrti	Zvonimir Majdak, Kćerka; Radoslav Petković, Senke na zidu; Milisav Savić, Topola na terasi; Slobodan Selenić, Očevi i oci; Nedjeljko Fabrio, Vježbanje života	
1984		Milorad Pavić	Hazarski rečnik (Dictionary of the Khazars)	Miroslav Popović, Sudbine; Ivan Aralica, Duše robova; Mladen Markov, Isterivanje boga; Biljana Jovanović, Duša, jedinica moja; Momo Kapor, Knjiga žalbi	
1983		Dragoslav Mihailović	Čizmaši	Borislav Pekić, Besnilo	
1982		Antonije Isaković	Tren 2		
1981		Pavao Pavličić	Večernji akt	Milan Oklopčić, Kalifornija bluz; Vojin Jelić, Doživotni grešnik; Voja Čolanović, Levi dlan, desni dlan; Dubravka Ugrešić, Štefica Cvek u raljama života; Milorad Pavić, Mali noćni roman	
1980		Slobodan Selenić	Prijatelji		
1979		Pavle Ugrinov	Zadat život		
1978		Mirko Kovač	Vrata od utrobe		
1977		Petko Vojnić Purčar	Dom, sve dalji		
1976		Aleksandar Tišma	Upotreba čoveka (The Use of Man)	Žarko Komanin, Kolijevka; Ćamil Sijarić, Carska vojska; Vukašin Mićunović, Bolovanja; Pavle Ugrinov, Fascinacije; Sveta Lukić, Vodeni cvetovi; Mirko Kovač, Ruganje s dušom; Mladen Markov, Smutnoe vreme	
1975		Miodrag Bulatović	Ljudi sa četiri prsta	Vojin Jelić, Pobožni đavo; Niko Jovićević, Modra oka; Dragoslav Mihailović, Petrijin venac; Radomir Smiljanić, U Andima Hegelovo telo	
1974		Jure Franičević-Pločar	Vir	Branimir Šćepanović, Usta puna zemlje; Momo Kapor, Foliranti	
1973		Mihailo Lalić	Ratna sreća		
1972		Danilo Kiš	Peščanik (Hourglass)	Aleksandar Tišma, Knjiga o Blamu	
1971		Miloš Crnjanski	Roman o Londonu (A Novel of London)		
1970		Borislav Pekić	Hodočašće Arsenija Njegovana (Houses of Belgrade / Houses)	Mihailo Lalić, Pramen tame; Boško Petrović, Dolazak na kraj leta	
1969		Bora Ćosić	Uloge moje porodice u svetskoj revoluciji (My Family's Role in the World Revolution)	Voja Čolanović, Pustolovina po meri; Jara Ribnikar, Jan Nepomucki	
1968		Slobodan Novak	Mirisi, zlato i tamjan (Gold, Frankincense, and Myrrh)	Slobodan Selenić, Memoari Pere Bogalja; Dragoslav Mihailović, Kad su cvetale tikve	
1967		Erih Koš	Mreže		
1966		Meša Selimović	Derviš i smrt (Death and the Dervish)		
1965		Ranko Marinković	Kiklop (Cyclops)		
1964		Oskar Davičo (3)	Tajne		
1963		Oskar Davičo (2)	Gladi		
1962		Miroslav Krleža	Zastave (vol. 1)		
1961		Dobrica Ćosić (2)	Deobe		
1960		Radomir Konstantinović	Izlazak (Exitus)	Mihailo Lalić, Hajka: Jozo Laušić, Kostolomi; Vlado Maleski, Ono što beše nebo	
1959		No award given			
1958		Branko Ćopić	Ne tuguj bronzana stražo	Miodrag Bulatović, Vuk i zvono; Ivanka Vujičić-Lašovska, Čahure; Radomir Konstantinović, Čisti i prljavi; Erih Koš, Il tifo; Momčilo Milankov, Jesenji događaji; Bora Ćosić, Svi smrtni	
1957		Aleksandar Vučo	Mrtve javke	Vladan Desnica, Proljeća Ivana Galeba: Mihailo Lalić, Lelejska gora; Dušan Matić, Kocka je bačena; Mića Popović, Izlet	
1956		Oskar Davičo	Beton i svici	Svetlana Velmar Janković, Ožiljak; Radomir Konstantinović, Mišolovka	
1955		Mirko Božić	Neisplakani	Vjekoslav Kaleb, Bijeli kamen; Novak Simić, Braća i kumiri	
1954		Dobrica Ćosić	Koreni (The Roots)	Aleksadar Vučo, Raspust; Radomir Konstantinović, Daj nam danas; Ivan Potrč, Na kmetih; Jara Ribnikar, Nedovršeni krug; Ervin Šinko, Optimisti	

== Jury members ==
Year(s)	Member #1	Member #2	Member#3	Member#4	Member#5	Member#6	Member#7	Member#8	Member#9	Member#10
1954-1963	Milan Bogdanović	Velibor Gligorić	Eli Finci	Borislav Mihajlović Mihiz	Zoran Mišić	Stevan Majstorović				
1964	Petar Džadžić	Velibor Gligorić	Eli Finci	Borislav Mihajlović Mihiz						
1965-1970	Petar Džadžić	Velibor Gligorić	Eli Finci	Borislav Mihajlović Mihiz	Zoran Mišić	Miloš I. Bandić	Muharem Pervić			
1971-1972	Petar Džadžić	Velibor Gligorić	Eli Finci	Midhad Begić	Igor Mandić	Miloš I. Bandić	Draško Ređep			
1973	Petar Džadžić	Velibor Gligorić	Eli Finci	Mladen Leskovac	Dalibor Cvitan	Miloš I. Bandić	Radovan Vučković			
1974	Petar Džadžić	Žika Bogdanović	Sreten Asanović	Mladen Leskovac	Dalibor Cvitan	Muharem Pervić	Radovan Vučković			
1975	Petar Džadžić	Žika Bogdanović	Sreten Asanović	Vuk Filipović	Dalibor Cvitan	Muharem Pervić	Radovan Vučković	Milan Vlajčić		
1976	Petar Džadžić	Jovica Aćin	Sreten Asanović	Vuk Filipović	Dalibor Cvitan	Muharem Pervić	Radovan Vučković	Sreten Marić	Čedomir Mirković	Vladimir Stojšin
1977-1979	Miloš I. Bandić	Jovica Aćin	Vaso Milinčević	Vuk Krnjević	Milosav Mirković	Muharem Pervić				
1980	Svetozar Koljević	Milivoj Solar	Vaso Milinčević	Milan Vlajčić	Milosav Mirković	Muharem Pervić	Sreten Marić			
1981	Svetozar Koljević	Milivoj Solar	Boško Petrović	Milan Vlajčić	Milosav Mirković	Marko Nedić	Andrej Inkart			
1982	Dušan Veličković	Nikola Kovač	Boško Petrović	Muharem Pervić	Igor Mandić	Marko Nedić	Andrej Inkart			
1983	Zoran Gluščević	Nikola Kovač	Jovica Aćin	Muharem Pervić	Igor Mandić	Teodor Anđelić	Đorđije Vuković			
1984	Zoran Gluščević	Slavko Leovac	Jovica Aćin	Muharem Pervić	Velimir Visković	Teodor Anđelić	Đorđije Vuković			
1985	Milivoj Srebro	Slavko Leovac	Vaso Milinčević	Miroslav Egerić	Velimir Visković	Novak Kilibarda	Bogdan Tirnanić			
1986	Milivoj Srebro	Predrag Matvejević	Vaso Milinčević	Miroslav Egerić	Zdenko Lešić	Novak Kilibarda	Bogdan Tirnanić			
1987	Jovan Deretić	Predrag Matvejević	Ljubiša Jeremić	Slavko Gordić	Zdenko Lešić	Teodor Anđelić				
1988	Jovan Deretić	Branko Popović	Svetozar Koljević	Slavko Gordić	Igor Mandić	Teodor Anđelić	Novak Kilibarda			
1989	Božo Koprivica	Branko Popović	Svetozar Koljević	Borislav Mihajlović Mihiz	Igor Mandić	Gojko Tešić	Novak Kilibarda			
1990	Božo Koprivica	Svetlana Slapšak	Marko Vešović	Slavko Gordić	Dušan Veličković	Gojko Tešić	Vasa Pavković			
1991	Marko Nedić	Svetlana Slapšak	Marko Vešović	Slavko Gordić	Pavle Zorić	Sava Dautović	Vasa Pavković			
1992	Marko Nedić	Slavko Leovac	Čedomir Mirković	Miroslav Egerić	Pavle Zorić					
1993	Đorđe Janić	Slavko Leovac	Čedomir Mirković	Miroslav Egerić	Ljiljana Šop	Borislav Mihajlović Mihiz (honorary member)				
1994	Đorđe Janić	Stojan Vujičić	Nikola Milošević	Tihomir Brajović	Ljiljana Šop					
1995	Petar Pijanović	Stojan Vujičić	Mihailo Pantić	Tihomir Brajović	Gojko Božović					
1996	Petar Pijanović	Nikola Milošević	Mihailo Pantić	Tihomir Brajović	Gojko Božović					
1997	Đorđije Vuković	Nikola Milošević	Aleksandar Ilić	Miroslav Egerić	Želidrag Nikčević					
1998	Đorđije Vuković	Branko Popović	Aleksandar Ilić	Miroslav Egerić	Želidrag Nikčević					
1999-2000	Đorđije Vuković	Boško Ivkov	Aleksandar Ilić	Teofil Pančić	Svetozar Koljević					
2001	Adrijana Marčetić	Boško Ivkov	Tihomir Brajović	Teofil Pančić	Svetozar Koljević					
2002	Adrijana Marčetić	Petar Pijanović	Ivan Negrišorac	Aleksandar Jerkov	Svetozar Koljević					
2003	Adrijana Marčetić	Petar Pijanović	Ivan Negrišorac	Aleksandar Jerkov	Dušan Marinković					
2004-2005	Tihomir Brajović	Petar Pijanović	Ivan Negrišorac	Aleksandar Jerkov	Dušan Marinković					
2006	Tihomir Brajović	Milan Vlajčić	Aleksandar Jovanović	Stevan Tontić	Slobodan Vladušić					
2007-2008	Milo Lompar	Milan Vlajčić	Aleksandar Jovanović	Stevan Tontić	Slobodan Vladušić					
2009	Milo Lompar	Milan Vlajčić	Aleksandar Jovanović	Aleksandar Ilić	Mladen Šukalo					
2010	Vasa Pavković	Ljiljana Šop	Mileta Aćimović Ivkov	Aleksandar Ilić	Mladen Šukalo					
2011-2013	Vasa Pavković	Ljiljana Šop	Mileta Aćimović Ivkov	Vladislava Gordić Petković	Mića Vujičić					
2013-2014	Božo Koprivica	Jasmina Vrbavac	Mihailo Pantić	Vladislava Gordić Petković	Mića Vujičić					
2015-2017	Božo Koprivica	Jasmina Vrbavac	Mihailo Pantić	Zoran Paunović	Tamara Krstić					
2018	Branko Kukić	Ivan Milenković	Marjan Čakarević	Zoran Paunović	Tamara Krstić					
2019-2021	Branko Kukić	Ivan Milenković	Marjan Čakarević	Teofil Pančić	Marija Nenezić					
2022	Milena Đorđijević	Žarka Svirčev	Goran Korunović	Teofil Pančić	Marija Nenezić					
2023	Milena Đorđijević	Žarka Svirčev	Goran Korunović	Tamara Mitrović	Violeta Stojmenović					
2024	Aleksandar Jerkov	Mladen Vesković	Adrijana Marčetić	Tamara Mitrović	Vladimir Gvozden					
2025	Aleksandar Jerkov	Mladen Vesković	Adrijana Marčetić	Jelena S. Mladenović	Vladimir Gvozden					

== See also ==
- Isidora Sekulić Award
