= Saša Ilić =

Saša Ilić may refer to:

- Saša Ilić (footballer, born 1970), Macedonian football goalkeeper
- Saša Ilić (footballer, born 1972), Serbian-Australian football goalkeeper
- Saša Ilić (writer, born 1972), Serbian writer
- Saša Ilić (footballer, born 1977), Serbian football midfielder
