= Slobodan Vladušić =

Serbian writer and associate professor of Serbian literature

Slobodan Vladušić (Serbian-Cyrillic: Слободан Владушић; born 9 May 1973) is a Serbian writer and associate professor of Serbian literature at the Philosophical Faculty of the University of Novi Sad.

== Biography ==
Slobodan Vladušić studied Serbian literature at the Faculty of Philosophy of the University of Novi Sad, graduated with Magister degree in 2005 and obtained his doctorate as PhD in 2008. He is associate professor at the department of Serbian literature of the university.

The academic was member of the editorial board of the literary magazine Reč (Serbian: Word; 1996-1999) while he was a student. Many of his reviews and essays on literature have been published in Politika, Večernje novosti, Nedeljnik, NIN and Pečat. From 2007 to 2010, he was a member of Jury of the NIN Award, and from 2010 to 2012, member of Jury of the Ivo Andrić Award. The literary scholar was editor-in-chief of the literary magazine Letopis Matice srpske (Chronicle of Serbian Matica) from 2013-16. Vladušić became member of political council (Politički savet) of the Democratic Party of Serbia in 2017.

== Bibliography (selection) ==
- Portret hermeneutičara u tranziciji: studije o književnosti (Portrait of Hermeneutics in Transition: literary studies), Dnevnik, Novi Sad 2007, ISBN 978-86-84097-93-6.
- Forward (Forward: crime comedy), Stubovi kulture, Belgrade 2009, ISBN 978-86-7979-270-9.
- Crnjanski, Megalopolis, Službeni glasnik, Belgrade 2011, ISBN 978-86-519-1090-9.
- Mi, izbrisani: video-igra (We, deleted: video game), Laguna, Belgrade 2013, ISBN 978-86-521-1269-2.
- Košarka to je Partizan : mit o Košarkaškom klubu Partizan (Basketball is Partizan: myth about KK Partizan), Vukotić media, Belgrade 2016, ISBN 978-86-89613-44-5.
- Veliki juriš (The Grand Assault), Laguna, Belgrade 2018, ISBN 978-86-521-3014-6.

== Awards ==
- Milan Bogdanović Award 2004 for best literary criticism
- Borislav Pekić Award 2008 for Forward
- Golden Sunflower Award 2009 (Zlatni suncokret) for Forward
- Isidora Sekulić Award 2011 for Crnjanski, Megalopolis
- Meša Selimović Award 2013 for Mi, izbrisani: video-igra
- Laza Kostić Award 2017 for Literature and Comments
- Đorđe Jovanović Award 2018 for Literature and Comments
- Svetozar Ćorović Award 2019 for The Grand Assault
- Janko Veselinović Award 2019 for The Grand Assault
