= Ana Vučković =

Serbian writer (born 1984)

Ana Vučković Denčić
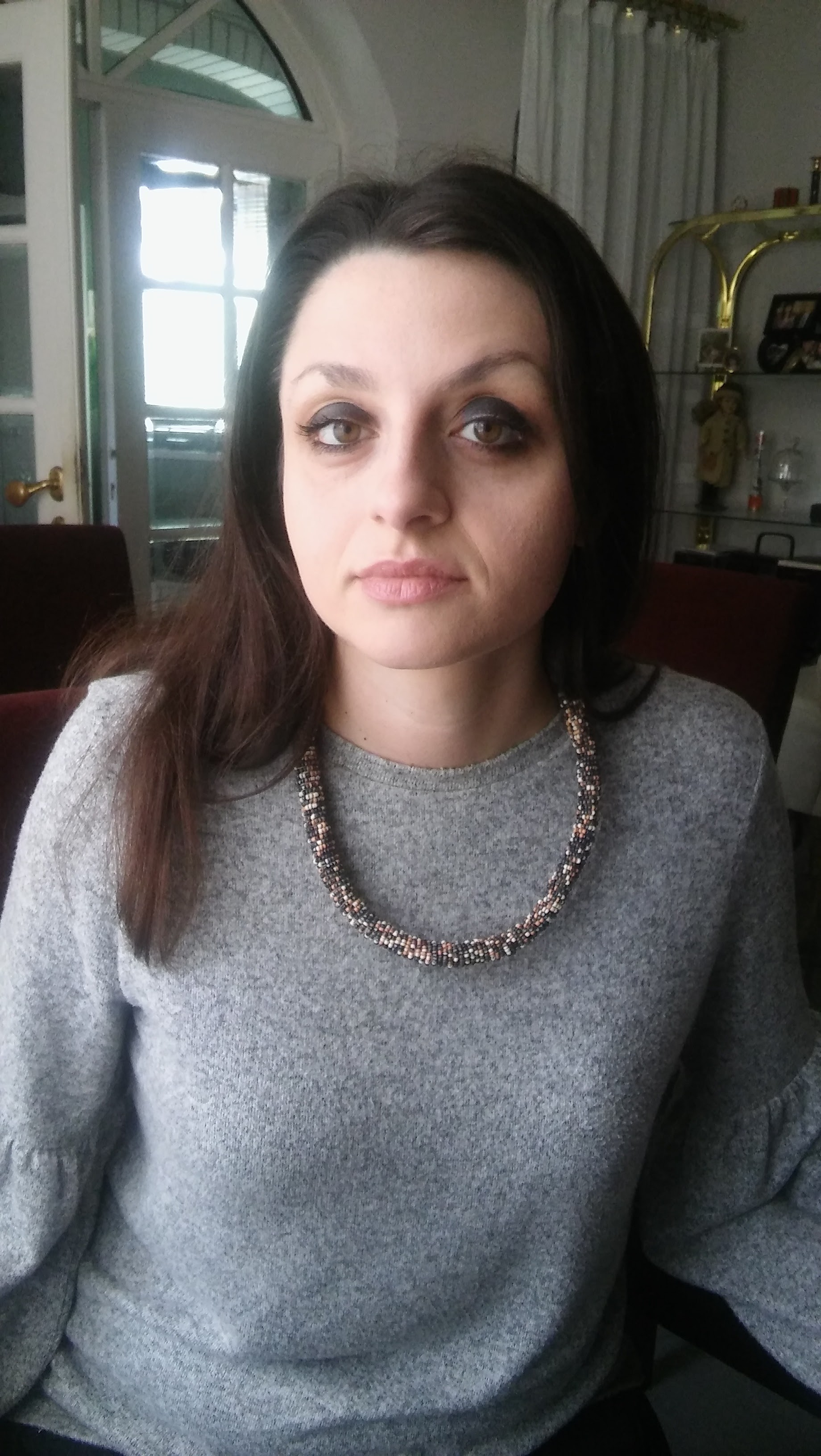
- Vučković in 2017
- Born: Ana Vučković; 16 November 1984 (age 41); Belgrade, SR Serbia, SFR Yugoslavia
- Occupations: Novelist, short-story writer
- Writing career
- Genre: Literary fiction

Ana Vučković Denčić (Serbian Cyrillic: Ана Вучковић Денчић; born 16 November 1984) is a Serbian author, screenwriter and radio host.

== Biography ==
Born and raised in Belgrade, Vučković graduated in dramaturgy and obtained her Master's degree in filmology at the Faculty of Dramatic Arts, University of Arts in Belgrade. She has published one collection of stories and four novels, two of which were among finalists for the prestigious NIN Award (Epoha lipsa juče in 2003 and Yugoslav in 2019). Her story was selected for the anthology Kraljica Lir i njena deca: najbolje priče savremenih srpskih spisateljica (Queen Lear and her Children: The best stories by contemporary Serbian women writers), alongside authors Velmar-Janković, Mićić-Dimovska, Ognjenović, among others.

Her writing has been translated into several languages, including English, German, Macedonian, Maltese, and Greek.

She has worked at the Radio Belgrade and as a columnist of the City Magazine and the nova.rs portal.

== Bibliography ==
- Epoha lipsa juče (2003), novel
- Lust 'n' dust (2004), novel
- Plišani soliter (2007), collection of stories
- Surfing Srbija (2012), novel
- Yugoslav (2019), novel
- Bazen (2024), collection of stories

== Sources ==
- Milić, Marija (19 September 2019). "Ana Vučković Denčić: Sve što sam pisala bilo je lično". Oblakoder.
- Selaković, Branka (26 January 2020). "Ana Vučković: Okidač pisanja 'Yugoslava' bila je smrt oca". Al Jazeera.
- Radojković, Sara (29 May 2019). "Ana Vučković Denčić za VICE o tome šta pisanje o smrti roditelja nosi sa sobom". Vice.
- Milenković, Ivan (27 February 2020). "Živimo bez dobrih mitova". Vreme.
- Ratković, Vanja (18 January 2020). "Književnica Ana Vučković: Nagrade su mač sa dve oštrice, pogotovo NIN-ova". Noizz.

=== About books ===
- Mihajlović Andrija (9 September 2008). "Ana Vučković - Plišani soliter". B92.
