= Milena Marković =

Serbian poet and playwright

Milena Marković (born 1974) is a Serbian poet and playwright. Her plays have been staged across Europe and United States, and she received numerous literary prizes, including 2021 NIN Award for her novel in verse Deca.

== Biography ==
She was born in Zemun and graduated at the Faculty of Dramatic Arts in Belgrade in 1998.

The interweaving of poetry and drama was visible from her first play Paviljoni (kuda idem odakle dolazim i šta ima za večeru), which was awarded at the competition for playwrights in 2000 in Vienna, and performed at the Yugoslav Drama Theatre in 2001. Both her first play Paviljoni and her second drama Šine address the topic of young people in an urban environment that is experiencing social decline, inspired by Belgrade in the 1990s. The theme of growing up continues to be present throughout her further work as well. Her plays Brod za lutke and Šuma blista have enjoyed great success at international festivals.

Marković published six poetry collections between 2001 and 2014, and the novel in verse Deca (Children) in 2021. Her poems have been awarded for their original language and style, and unique treatment of the topics of family, motherhood, children and historical traumas of the Balkans.

Sympathy for the Salami, Marković's first book of poetry translated to English by Maja and Steven Teref, was published in 2024 and longlisted for ALTA's 2025 National Translation Award in Poetry.

She has also written screenplays for film, such as Otadžbina, winner for Best Screenplay at the 44 FEST International Film Festival.

Marković works as a professor at the Faculty of Dramatic Arts in Belgrade. She is a corresponding member of the Serbian Academy of Arts and Sciences.

== Selected works ==
Marković writes poetry, plays, and screenplays for film and TV.

=== Poetry ===
- Pas koji je pojeo sunce
- Istina ima teranje
- Crna kašika
- Ptičje oko na tarabi
- Pre nego što sve počne da se vrti
- Pesme za žive i mrtve
- Deca

=== Drama ===
- Paviljoni
- Šine
- Brod za lutke
- Nahod Simeon
- Šuma blista
- Žica
- Zmajeubice
- Deca radosti
- Pet života pretužnog Milutina
- Livada puna tame

== Awards ==
Her awards include:

- NIN Annual Award for the novel Deca, 2021
- Best screenplay for the film Otadžbina, 44 FEST Belgrade, 2016
- Sterija's Award for the text of the contemporary drama Zmajeubice, 2015
- Petar Kočić Award for ‘the best dramatic text’ for Brod za lutke, 2010
- Đura Jakšić Award for ‘the best collection of poems’ for Ptičje oko na tarabi, 2010
- Biljana Jovanović Literary Award for Ptičje oko na tarabi, 2009
- Sterija's Award for the text of the contemporary drama Brod za lutke, 2009
- Miloš Crnjanski Award for Tri drame, 2005
