= Petar Pijanović =

Serbian writer and professor

Petar Pijanović (Serbian-Cyrillic: Петар Пијановић; born 1 July 1949 in Kamenmost, Split-Dalmatia County, Yugoslavia) is a Serbian writer and professor at the Faculty of Teacher Education of the University of Belgrade.

== Biography ==
Petar Pijanović graduated from Imotski secondary school (gymnasium) with maturity in 1968, then he began studying at the Philological faculty Belgrade, graduated with diploma in 1973, with Magister degree in 1976, and obtained his doctorate with thesis on Poetics of Borislav Pekić’s novels (Poetika romana Borislava Pekića) in 1989. He worked as journalist of the newspaper Politika (1974–75), as editor of the literary journal Književne novine of the Association of Writers (1975–81), as teacher at the Tenth Belgrade Gymnasium Mihajlo Pupin in New Belgrade (1975–81), was member of leading staff of Zavod za udžbenike (Institute for Publishing of Instructional materials) from 1981 to 2006, and at last he became appointed full professor at the Faculty of Teacher Education in 2006.

Pijanović was President of Jury (1995, 2004, 2005) of NIN Award.

== Works (selection) ==
- Proza Danila Kiša (Prose of Danilo Kiš), essay, monography, Jedinstvo, Dečje novine, Oktoih Publishing, Publication series Biblioteka Obeležja (Library of Attributes), Priština, Gornji Milanovac and Podgorica 1992.
- Pavić, monography, Filip Višnjić Publishing, Belgrade 1998, ISBN 86-7363-211-0.
- Književnost i srpski jezik (Serbian Literature and Serbian Language), textbook for secondary schools, Zavod za udžbenike, Belgrade 2010, ISBN 978-86-17-16853-5.
- Rasprava o Gatalici (Discussion on Gatalica), KOV, Vršac 2015, ISBN 978-86-7497-251-9.
- Anđeli i ratnici: stara srpska kultura (Angels and Warriors: Old Serbian Culture), Zavod za udžbenike, Belgrade 2018, ISBN 978-86-17-19884-6.

== Awards ==
- Isidora Sekulic Award 1992
- Đorđe Jovanović Award 1998
