= Oto Horvat =

Serbian poet and writer (born 1967)

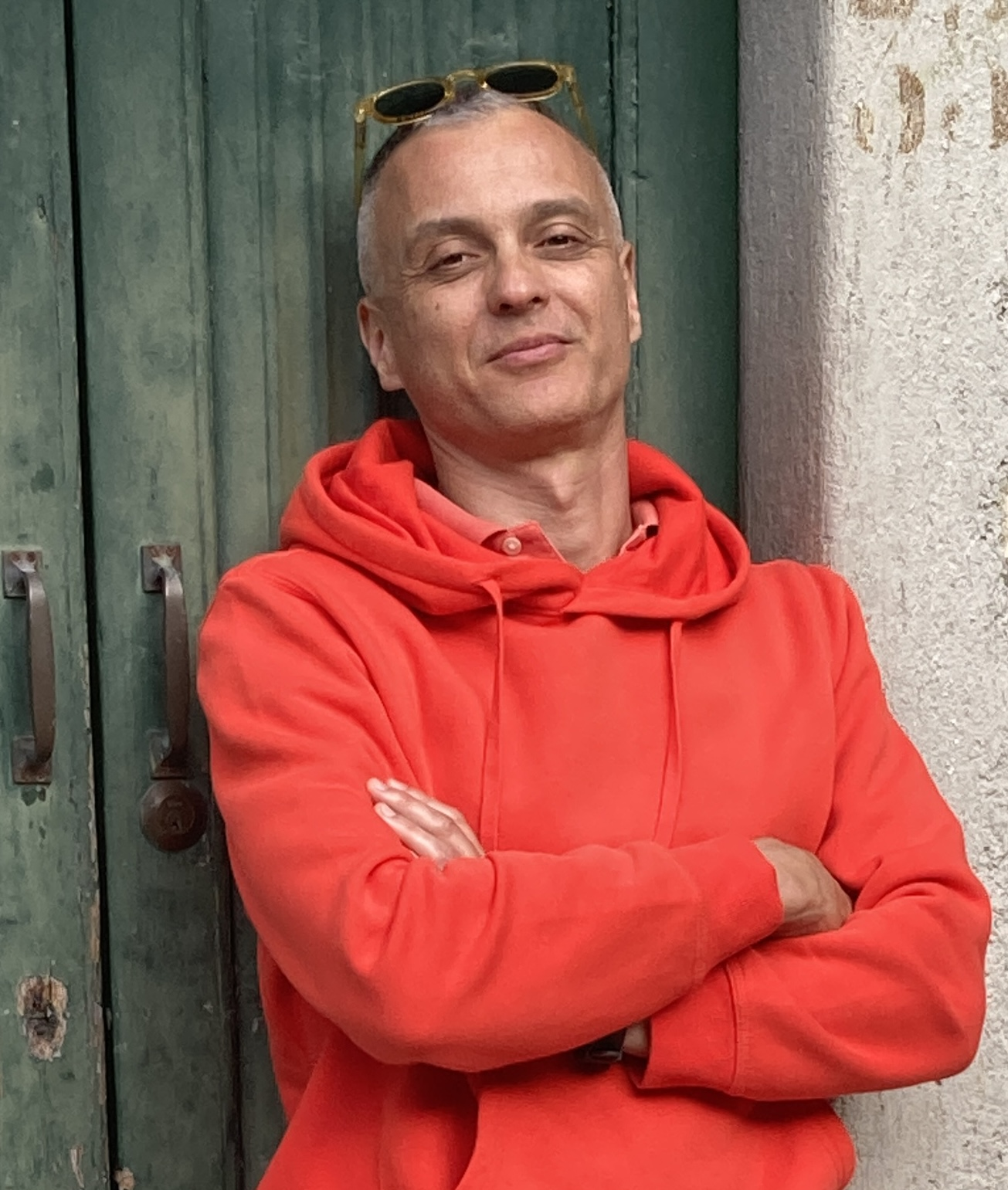
Oto Horvat in 2025

Oto Horvat (born in 1967) is a Serbian poet and writer. He lives and works in Florence, Italy.

== Recent activity ==
In 2017, Oto Horvat has signed the Declaration on the Common Language of the Croats, Serbs, Bosniaks and Montenegrins.

== Works ==
- Gde nestaje šuma (KZNS, Novi Sad, 1987, Branko Award)
- Zgrušavanje (Matica srpska, Novi Sad, 1990)
- Gorki listovi (Bratstvo Jedinstvo, Novi Sad, 1990)
- Fotografije (Prometej, Novi Sad, 1996)
- Canada. Gedichte (Verlag Bernhard Martin, Fuhrt (Bay), 1999)
- Dozvola za boravak (Narodna knjiga, Beograd, 2002)
- Putovati u Olmo (Narodna biblioteka Stefan Prvovenčani, Kraljevo, 2008)
- Izabrane & nove pesme (Kulturni centar Novog Sada, Novi Sad, 2009)
- Sabo je stao (Kulturni centar Novog Sada, Novi Sad, 2014)
- Kao Celanovi ljubavnici (Akademska knjiga, Novi Sad, 2016)
- Noćna projekcija (Akademska knjiga, Novi Sad, 2021)
- Momenti 1-49 (Akademska knjiga, Novi Sad, 2025)

His poems are represented in the anthologies Zvezde su lepe, ali nemam kad da ih gledam. Antologija srpske urbane poezije. Ed. Radmila Lazić (Beograd Samizdat B92); Die Neuen Mieter. Fremde Blick auf ein vertrautes Land, Ed. I. Mickiewicz (Berlin, Aufbau Taschenbuch Verlag, 2004) and Crtež koji kaplje. Vojvodina's new yearbook poetry Ed. S. Radonjic, (To jest, Novi Sad, 1988).

For Sabo je stao Horvat was shortlisted for the Nin prize in 2015, his novel won Biljana Jovanović and Mirko Kovač literary prizes in 2015.

=== Translations ===
- Janoš Pilinski, Krater. Selected Poems (JMMT Forum, Novi Sad, 1992)
- Oto Fenjveši, Anđeo haosa. Selected Poems (Prometheus, Novi Sad, 2009)
- Hans Magnus Encensberger, Poslednji pozdrav astronautima. Selected Poems (Agora, Zrenjanin, 2010)
