= Goran Gocić =

Serbian freelance journalist

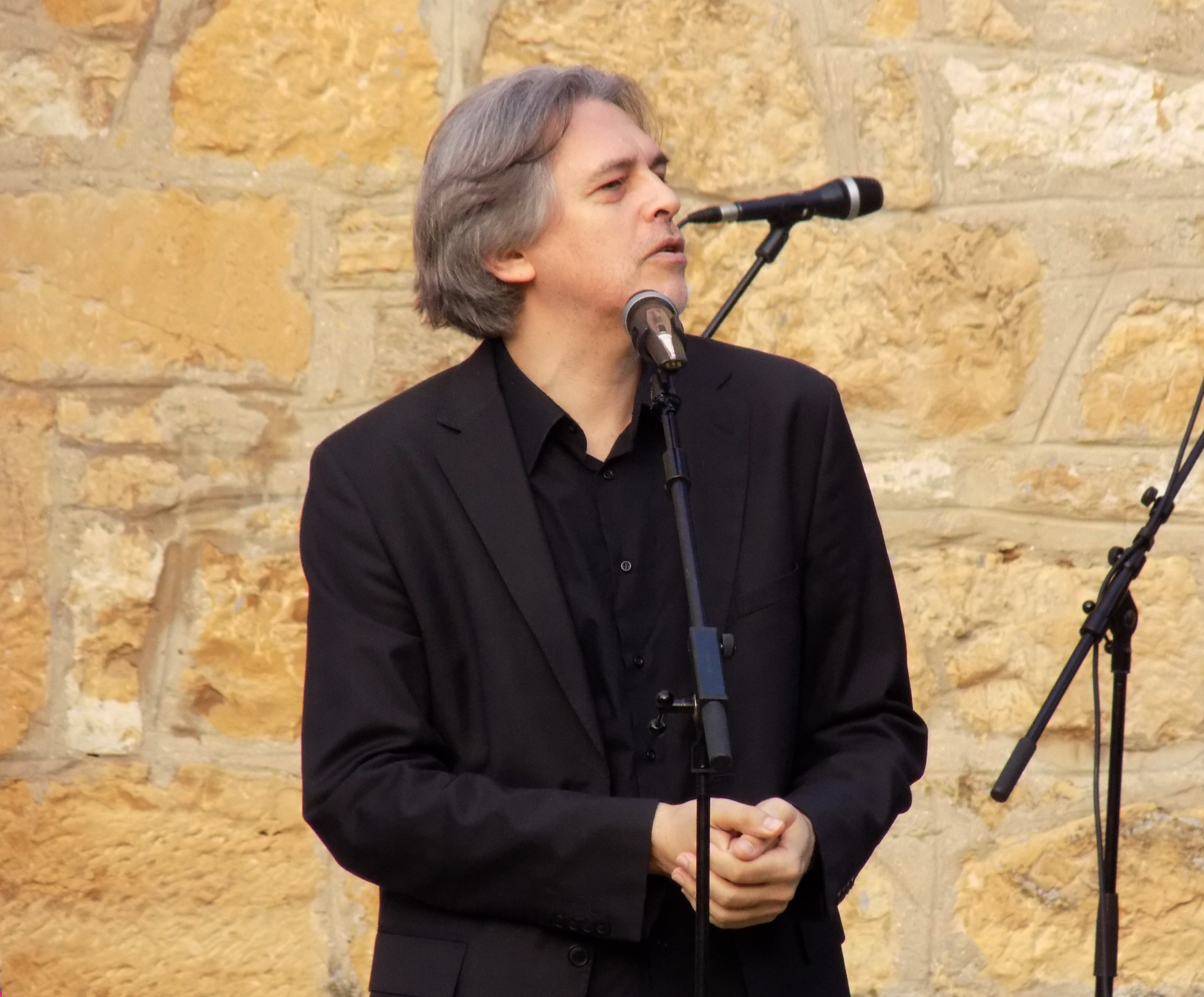
Gocić

Goran Gocić (born May 6, 1962) is a Serbian freelance journalist, editor, author and filmmaker, whose work has been published or broadcast by many media organizations worldwide. Gocic is the winner of the NIN Prize, a prestigious Serbian literary award for 2014.

== Books ==
- Pornocratia: A Cultural History of Sex in the Media (2008/2009), a monograph on the ascent of pornography in the West, is his largest project so far.
- Želimir Žilnik: Above the Red Dust (2003) (chapter)
- Notes from the Underground: The Cinema of Emir Kusturica (2001/2006)
- Degraded Capability: Media and the Kosovo Crisis (2000) (chapter)
- Andy Warhol and Strategies of Pop (1997)
- Tai (2013)
- Last Stop Britain (2017)
- A Man From Negligence (2021)

== Education ==
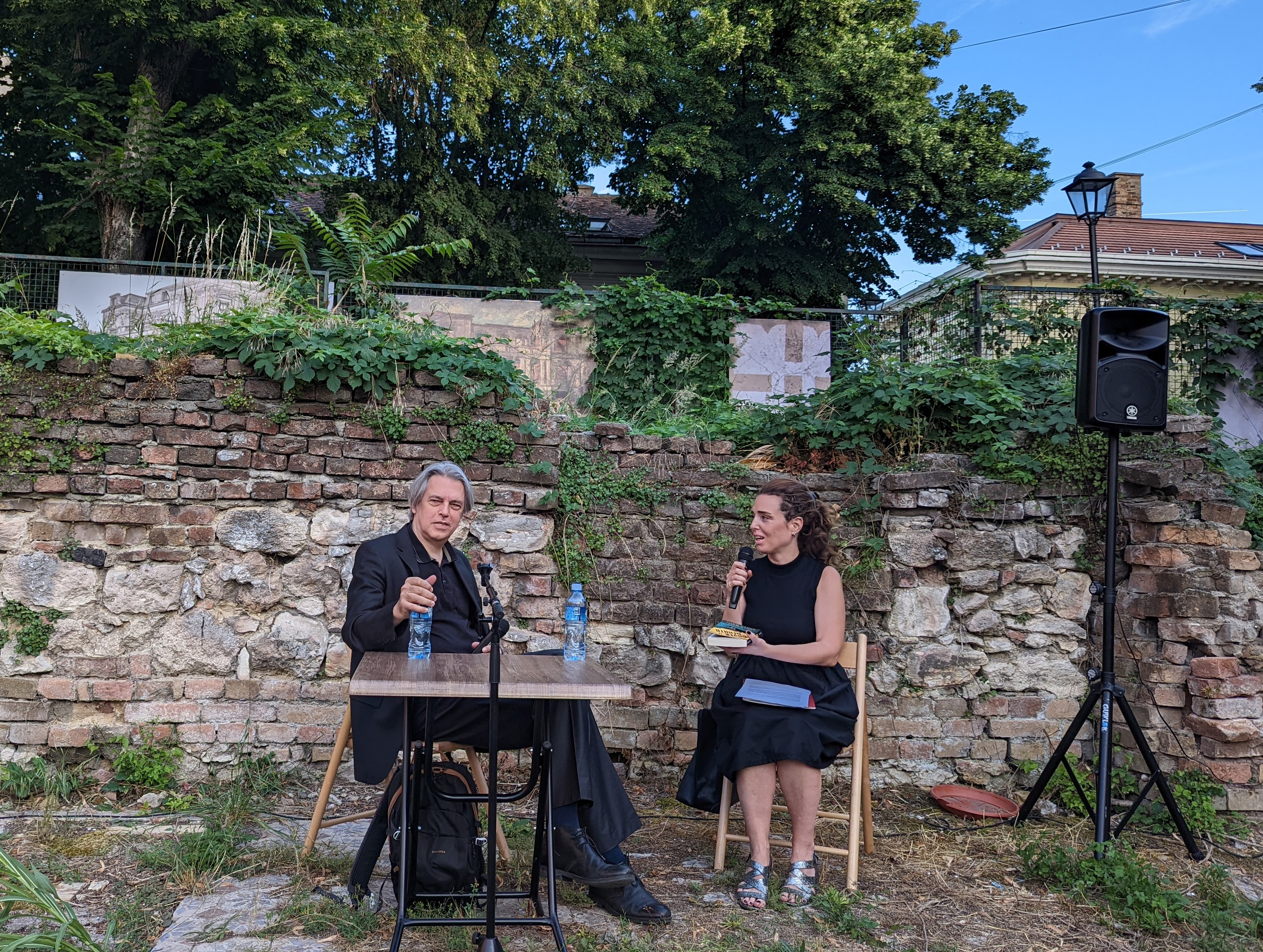
Goran Gocić in conversation with Milena Đorđijević, at Kosančićev venac in Belgrade

Gocić graduated from the Faculty of Philology in Belgrade in 1991 with a degree in English language and literature. He received an M.A. in Media and Communications from the London School of Economics in 1999.

== Cinematography ==
Gocić worked as an undercover reporter (in style of Gunter Walraff’s Ganz Unten) in the documentary Bloody Foreigners (2001) for the UK Channel 4 series Dispatches. He has become a champion of the DV revolution.

He runs Force Majeure, the production company for feature documentaries Balkan Diaries: Bulgaria, on Orthodox priests facing transitional turmoil and Today a Visa, Tomorrow the World on Serbian troubles with visas.
