= Miroslav Josić Višnjić =

Serbian writer (1946–2015)

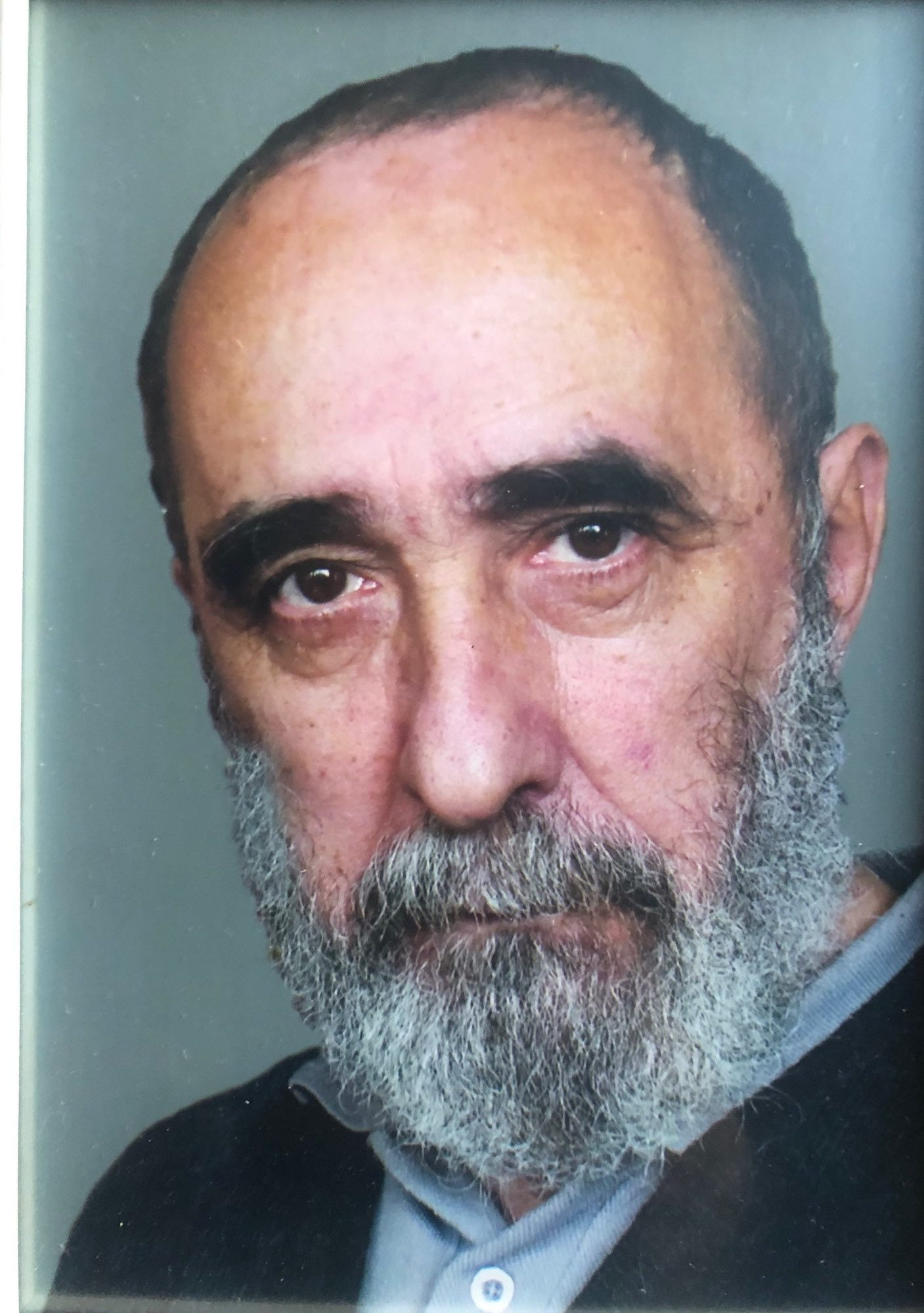
Photo of Josić Višnjić

Miroslav Josić Višnjić (15 December 1946 – 8 September 2015) was a Serbian writer and poet. He won numerous literary prizes, most notably NIN Prize 1990 for his novel Odbrana i propast Bodroga u sedam burnih godišnjih doba and the Andrić Prize in 1998. He died at the age of 69.

== Selected works ==
=== Novels ===
- Odbrana i propast Bodroga u sedam burnih godišnjih doba
- Pristup u počinak
- Roman bez romana
- Svetovno trojstvo
- Roman o smrti galerije

=== Short stories collections ===
- Kvartet
- Dvanaest godova

=== Poems ===
- Azbuka smeha

=== Essays ===
- Azbučnik prideva u srpskoj prozi 20. veka
