= Mirjana Novaković =

Serbian writer (born 1966)

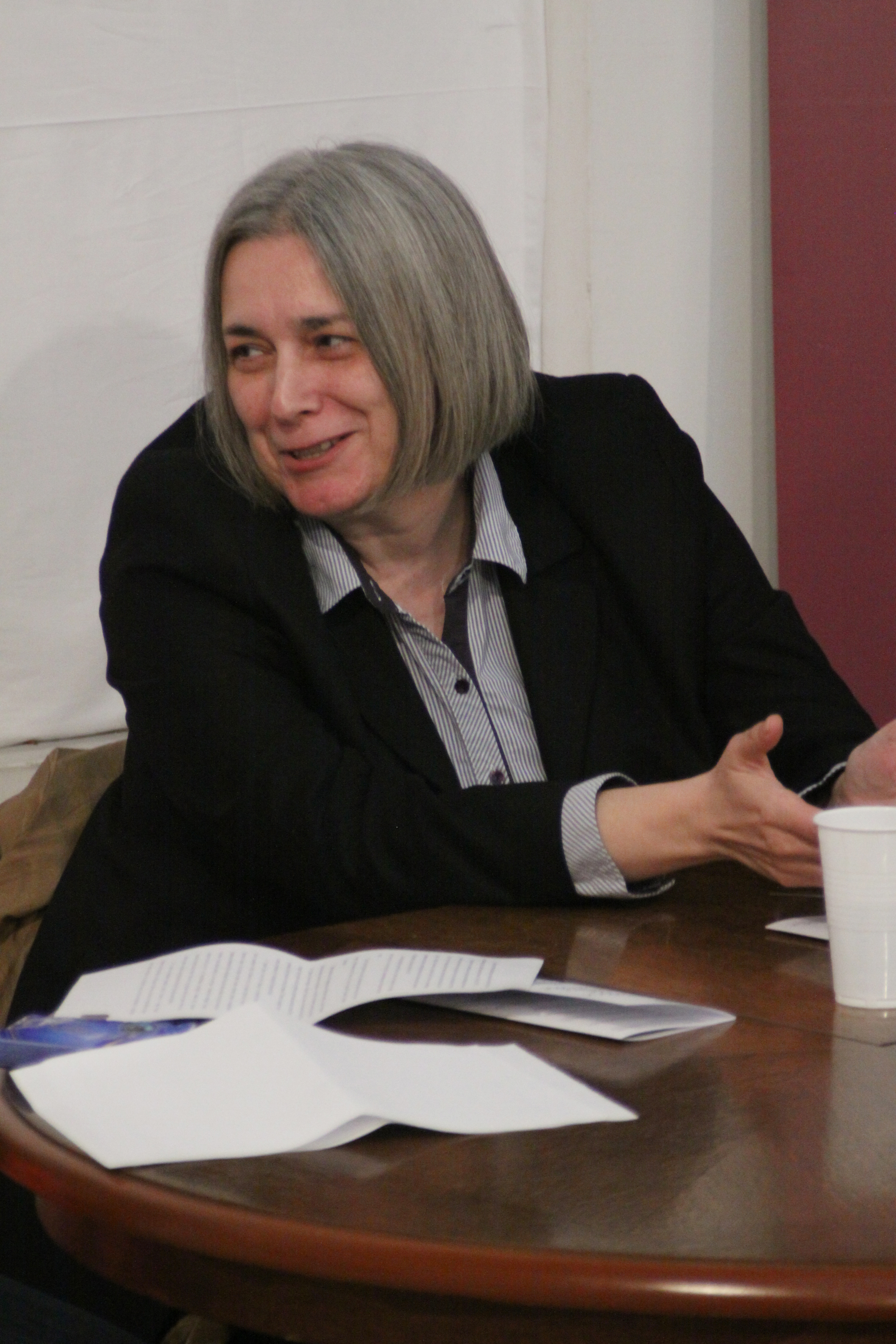
Mirjana Novaković

Mirjana Novaković (Serbian-Cyrillic: Мирјана Новаковић; born 28 April 1966) is a Serbian writer.

== Life and work ==
She was born in Belgrade, SFR Yugoslavia.

Mirjana Novaković is one of the most popular female representatives of contemporary Serbian literature.

The novel Fear And His Servant is represented at the international book market with translations into French (2005), English (2009 and 2017), Macedonian and Arabic (2013), Russian (2014) and Chinese (2015). The first English edition (2009) was published by Geopoetika publishing in Belgrade and Peter Owen publishing from London published a second edition in the same year due to its great success, and in 2017 even a third edition took place. The novel’s dramatized version premiered at BELEF Summer Festival 2003 co-operated by Atelje 212 in Kalemegdan Fortress. The novel Tito Has Died has already been published in Bulgarian (2014) and Greek (2014). She received the Isidora Sekulić Award 2000 for Fear And His Servant and the Lazar Komarčić Award 2005 (best science-fiction novel) for Johann’s 501. All these three mentioned works has been nominated for the final selections of the NIN Award. Mirjana Novaković was participant of the Leipzig Book Fair 2010, the Neue Rundschau published her short story What Is Lost (Što je izgubljeno) in the same year.

== Awards and honors ==
- Isidora Sekulić Award, 2000
- Lazar Komarčić Award, 2005

== Bibliography ==
- Dunavski apokrifi (Danubian Apocrypha), short stories, Matica srpska, Novi Sad 1996.
- Strah i njegov sluga (Fear and his Servant), novel, ReVision Publishing, Belgrade 2000, ISBN 86-7304-0159.
- La peur et son valet (Fear and his Servant), Gaïa Éditions, Montfort-en-Chalosse 2005, ISBN 2-84720-050-9.
- Johann's 501, novel, Narodna knjiga–Alfa, Belgrade 2005, ISBN 86-331-2262-6.
- Tito je umro (Tito Has Died), Laguna, Belgrade 2011, ISBN 978-86-521-0799-5.
- Tajne priče (Secret Stories), short stories, Laguna, Belgrade 2016, ISBN 978-86-521-2304-9.
- Fear And His Servant, Peter Owen Publishers, London 2009 and 2017, ISBN 978-0-7206-1977-5.
- Страх и его слуга (Fear and his Servant), Lemax, Pskov 2014, ISBN 978-5-905952-03-6.
- Ο Τίτο πέθανε (Tito Has Died), Livanis, Athens 2014, ISBN 978-960-14-2897-0.
- Тито умря (Tito Has Died), Aton, Sofia 2014, ISBN 978-954-82-5231-7.
- 恐惧与仆人 (Fear and Servant), Anhui Literature and Art Publishing House, Hefei 2015, ISBN 978-7-5396-5518-5.
- Mir i mir (Peace and Peace), Laguna, Belgrade 2022, ISBN 978-86-521-4275-0
- Страх и его слуга (Fear And His Servant), Eksmo, Moscow 2025, ISBN 978-5-04-204050-4
