= Antonije Isaković =

Serbian academic

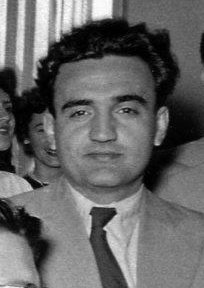
- Isaković in 1953
- Born: 6 November 1923; Rača, Kingdom of Serbs, Croats and Slovenes
- Died: 13 January 2002 (aged 78); Belgrade, FR Yugoslavia
- Occupations: Academic, writer and politician

Antonije Isaković (Serbian Cyrillic: Антоније Исаковић; 6 November 1923 – 13 January 2002) was a Serbian writer and member of the Serbian Academy of Science and Arts. He won the NIN Prize in 1982 for his novel Tren 2.

Isaković was the first editor-in-chief of the Serbian literary journal Delo.

He was one of the authors of the Memorandum of the Serbian Academy of Sciences and Arts, and was one of the fifty members of the Serbian Academy of Science and Arts who signed the petition against Slobodan Milošević in October 1999.

== Personal life ==
He was married to Leposava Isaković Milanin with whom he had a daughter, the actress Milica Milša.

== Bibliography ==
Antonije Isaković wrote numerous novels and stories and some of his selected works are:

- Velika deca, 1953
- Paprat i vatra, 1962
- Pripovetke, 1964
- Prazni bregovi, 1969
- Compilation of works in five volumes, 1976
- Tren 1, roman, 1976
- Tren 2, roman, 1982
- Berlin kaputt, 1982
- Obraz, 1988
- Govori i razgovori, 1990
- U znaku aprila: i druge priče, 1991
- Miran zločin, 1992
- Drugi deo mog veka: da se ne zaboravi, 1993
- Gospodar i sluge, 1995
- Riba, 1998
- Nestajanje, 2000
