= Radomir Konstantinović =

Serbian writer and philosopher

- Радомир Константиновић
- Born: March 27, 1928; Subotica, Kingdom of Serbs, Croats and Slovenes
- Died: October 27, 2011 (aged 83); Belgrade, Serbia
- Occupations: writer, philosopher
- Writing career
- Language: Serbo-Croatian
- Notable work: Filosofija palanke
- Notable awards: NIN Award; 1960 Izlazak

Radomir Konstantinović (Serbian Cyrillic: Радомир Константиновић; 1928−2011) was a Serbian writer and philosopher. His most famous work is a philosophical treatise Filosofija palanke (The small town philosophy). He won the literary NIN Award in 1960 for the novel Izlazak (Exodus).

== Biography ==
Konstantinović was born on 27 March 1928 in Subotica.

He started his literary career as a poet. He published a book of poetry Kuća bez krova (House without a roof) in 1951, but then switched to writing novels and wrote a whole series of experimental novels. His novel Izlazak (Exodus) won him the 1960 NIN Award for the best novel of the year. His most celebrated and iflunteial work The Philosophy of Parochialism first published in 1969. In this book Konstantinović proposes a philosophy of the small provincial mentality as a metaphor for closed-mindedenss and self-protection against the world at large, which resist openness and change. Therefore, creating suspicion of what beyond the hill, i.e., the world, causing anger and hostility against people of other origins. He examines how nationalism and totalitarian impulses arise from what he called the provincial mentality.

Radomir Konstantinović award is awarded every two years in his honour.

== Selected works ==
- Kuća bez krova (House without a roof) — 1951, poetry book
- Daj nam danas (Give us today) — 1954, novel
- Mišolovka (Mouse trap) — 1956, novel
- Čisti i prljavi (The dirty and the clean) — 1958, novel
- Izlazak (Exodus) — 1960, novel
- Ahasfer ili traktat o pivskoj flaši (Ahafser or the treatise on the beer bottle) — 1964, novel
- Pentagram — 1966, book of essays
- Filosofija palanke (Small town philosophy) — 1969, philosophical treatise
- Biće i jezik I-VIII (Being and language) — 1983
- Dekartova smrt (The death of Descartes) — 1996
- Beket prijatelj (Beckett friend) — 2000, collection of letters Samuel Beckett sent to Konstantinović

== Sources ==
- Ćosić, Bora (December 2001). "Zu einer 'Philosophie der Kleinstadt'" [The Author of the Small Town Philosophy]. Lettre International (in German) (54). Berlin: 104–105.
- David, Filip (2003). "Čovek suštine" [The man of essence]. Revija slobodne misli 99 (in Bosnian) (41–42).
- Perović, Latinka (28 January 2009). "Istorijski kontekst Konstantinovićevog dela" [Historical context of Konstantinović'c work]. Danas (in Serbian).
- Perović, Latinka (October 2011). "In memoriam: Radomir Konstantinović" (PDF). Helsinška povelja (155–156). Belgrade: Helsinki Committee for Human Rights in Serbia: 50. ISSN 1451-6195.
- Kaliterna, Tamara (4 November 2011). "Filozofija Srbije" [Philosophy of Serbia] (in Serbian). Monitor online.
- Otašević, Mira (27 December 2011). "Bekstvo iz jezika" [Escape from the language] (PDF). Sarajevske Sveske (35–36). Sarajevo/Ljubljana: 485–487. ISSN 1512-8539.
- Perović, Latinka (31 October 2014). "Stvarni život Filozofije palanke" [The Real Life of the Small Town Philosophy] (in Serbian). Danas.
