= Ratomir Damjanović =

Serbian radio journalist and writer

- Born: 29 January 1945 (age 81); Donji Tovarnik, Yugoslavia

Ratomir "Rale" Damjanović (Serbian Cyrillic: Ратомир Рале Дамјановић; born 29 January 1945) is a Serbian radio journalist, writer and reciter.

== Biography ==
Damjanović attended the primary school in Inđija and the secondary school (gymnasium) in Sremska Mitrovica, then he studied at the former Department of Yugoslav and World Literature of the Philological Faculty of Belgrade's University and graduated with diploma. After completion of his studies, he became radio journalist at Radio Belgrade in 1980, appointed as its deputy editor in chief of Program 202 and Radio Belgrade 2 since 1983. In 1991, he participated in the long-term strike actions of the media against the Milošević regime and its authoritarian media control and warmongering, then in 1993, he left the radio station as sign of his oppositional attitude and came back again in 2001. He established the publishing company Itaka together with his two sons in 1992. In the meantime, the recognized journalist of the radio station is in well-deserved retirement and was honored with the Golden Microphone Award for his life achievement in 2008.

The writer of novels, essays and short stories is laureate of renowned literary prizes such as the Miloš Crnjanski Award (1994) for Commemoration and the Isidora Sekulić Award (2005) for Johnny's solo; his novel Sancho's version has been nominated for the final selection of the NIN Award 1999. The novels Dirty Man, Sancho's Version and You Will Swim Forever are profound stories about the disintegration of Yugoslavia. All three novels tells about tragic heroes who lost everything they had and even themselves with the breakup of the country in which they were born: What I found about human suffering, which was summarized in twenty books on wars during the dissolution of Yugoslavia, is part of the essence of horrors and contemplation with sunglasses. Ordinary people became merciless torturers. Damjanović wrote these novels according to the model of Remarque and his pacifist work.

He was one of the editors of the anthology Serbia in the Works of Foreign Authors : poems, plays, short stories, excerpts from novels, epistles, war reports, essays, travel accounts (1996), which is available in English translation since 2000. Even at a young age, the author began to recite poems and texts by various authors at all sorts of occasions and cultural events. Over the decades, he has become a highly respected and beloved reciter with numerous phonograph records and CD recordings. Damjanović described his art of presentation on the occasion of a performance in Ruma as follows: the reciter must perfectly comprehend the text and then open all his discursive, reflexive creativity, emotional being, to express this text as his own opinion. He lives in Belgrade.

Damjanović was selected artist of the Fulbright program Artist-in-residence at University of California (UCLA) from 1971–72.

== Bibliography (selection) ==
- Komemoracija : pripovetke (Commemoration: narratives), Beletra, Belgrade 1993, ISBN 86-7469-079-3.
- Zgad (Dirty Man), novel, Srpska književna zadruga, Belgrade 1995, ISBN 86-379-0552-8.
- Govori srpski da te ceo svet razume (Speak Serbian That The Whole World Understands You; Serbian Proverb), Itaka, Belgrade 1996, ISBN 86-81635-05-0
- Novogodišnja noć (New Year's Eve), Rad, Belgrade 1997, ISBN 86-09-00519-4.
- Sančova verzija (Sancho's version), Srpska književna zadruga, Belgrade 1999, ISBN 86-379-0692-3.
- Homer, Kiklop i Srbi (Homer, Cyclops and Serbs), Prometej, Novi Sad 2002, essays, ISBN 86-7639-673-6
- Džonijev solo : pripovetke (Johnny's solo: narratives), Rad, Belgrade 2005, ISBN 86-09-00873-8.
- Nebo nad cirkusom : roman za decu i roditelje (The sky above the circus: novel for children and parents), Itaka, Belgrade 2008, ISBN 978-86-81635-55-1
- Plivaćeš zauvek : pripovest iz izbegličkog života (You'll swim forever: a narrative from a refugee life), Prometej, Nov Sad 2016, ISBN 978-86-515-1181-6.
- Autorsko recitovanje i doživljajno čitanje : istorija-teorija-poetika-praksa (Author recitation and experienced reading out: history-theory-poetics-practice), Itaka, Belgrade 2017, ISBN 978-86-81635-82-7.
