= Laslo Blašković =

Serbian writer

Laslo Blašković (Serbian Cyrillic: Ласло Блашковић; born 25 June 1966) is a Serbian writer and director of the National Library of Serbia.

== Biography ==
Blašković was born on 25 June 1966 in Novi Sad. He studied Yugoslav literature and Serbo-Croatian language and graduated at the University of Novi Sad, where he became appointed assistant to scientific research on Cultural history of the 19th century at the Department for Yugoslav literature of the Philosophical Faculty. He also took part in a project The Serbian biographic dictionary, conducted by Matica Srpska. He received scholarships from the Vojvodina Academy of Sciences and Arts (1990–1991), the Borislav Pekić Foundation (for the project of the novel Madonin nakit, 2001), the Foundation Kulturkontakt Austria (2008) and the Heinrich Böll Foundation in 2010.

From 2008 to 2012, he was director of the Cultural Center in Novi Sad and was dismissed by the directors board of the institution, because the nameplate of the center was attached only in Latin script during his tenue.

He was the main editor of the literary journal Polja (Fields), from the year 2001 to 2007. He is also a member of the Editorial Board for the First Book Edition of Matica Srpska and the main publishing editor at Srpsko Narodno Pozoriste (Serbian National Theater) in Novi Sad. He writes for radio and television.

He published 7 books of poetry:

- Gledaš, Matica srpska, Novi Sad, 1986
- Zlatno doba (The Golden era), Matica srpska, Novi Sad, 1987
- Crvene brigade (The red brigades), Bratstvo-jedinstvo, Novi Sad, 1989
- Ritam-mašina (The Rhythm – Machine), Četvrti talas, Novi Sad, 1991
- Životi bacača kocke (Lives of people rolling the dice), Prosveta, Belgrade, 1997
- Jutarnja daljina (The Morning distance), Stylos, Novi Sad, 2002
- Žene pisaca (The wives of writers), KOV, Vršac, 2006

He also published novels:

- Imenjak (The Namesake), Prometej, Novi Sad, 1994
- Svadbeni marš (The Wedding march), Stubovi kulture, 1997
- Mrtva priroda sa satom (Still life with a clock), Stubovi kulture, Belgrade, 2000
- Adamova jabučica (The Throat oh Adam), Narodna knjiga, Belgrade, 2005, Madonin nakit (The Jewels of Madona), Filip Višnjić, Belgrade, 2003
- Madonin šperk (translated into Slovak by Karol Hmel), Kalligram, Bratislava, 2006
- Turnir grbavaca (The tournament of the Hunch-backers), Geopoetika, Belgrade, 2007

His further work include:

- Kraj citata (The end of a quote), Prometej, Novi Sad, 2007 – an essay book
- Priča o malaksalosti (The story of feebleness), Arhipelag, Belgrade, 2010 – a book of stories

Some texts of Laslo Blašković have been translated into Hungarian, Romanian, Bulgarian, Slovak, Slovene, Ukrainian, Polish, German, French and the English language.

He is the winner of many awards for literary achievements: Pečat varoši sremskokarlovačke (For the best book of poetry written by younger authors, 1988), Matićev šal (for the best book of poetry written in Serbo-Croatian in the year of 1989), The book of the year by the Association of Writers of Vojvodina (for the best novel in Vojvodina, 1997), The award of the Serbian Academy of Science and Art from the Branko Ćopić foundation (for the best Serbian novel in the year 2005), the Stevan Sremac award (for the best book of stories/novel in the 2007) and the Ljubomir Nenadović Award 2017.

In the year of 2008, as a part of the international project Sto slovenskih romana, Madonin nakit, written by Blašković, was among the 10 best Serbian novels since the fall of the Berlin Wall and it will be translated into all Slavic languages.

He has been the member of The Serbian PEN Center since 2004 and the member of the board of The Serbian PEN Center since 2006. He is also one of the founders of The Serbian Association for literature and has been a member since 2001. He is also a member of the Managing Board in many important Funds for literature in Serbia. He was a participant of Residency programs for writers which have been organized by the Assembly of Vojvodina. A member of the managing board of the Todor Manojlović foundation.

He has also participated in many International meetings, conferences and festivals for writers in Belgrade, Novi Sad, Zagreb, Sarajevo, Bled Ohrid, Budapest, Ljubljana, Banja Luka, Leipzig etc. He was the art-director of the theoretical concept of the Word day of poetry 2007 in the Cultural centre of Belgrade and the member of the organization board for the First International prose festival in Novi Sad (2007). He took part in The European literature meetings in Sarajevo, 2007 (organized by the French cultural centre André Malraux). In several occasions he participated in The International gatherings of writers in Belgrade, the Square of poets in Budva and many other book fairs and salons in Belgrade, Novi Sad, Niš, Podgorica, Sofia and Herceg Novi. He also attended the literary evenings in Struga, Macedonia.

He organized international gatherings in Novi Sad and other cities in Vojvodina, dedicated to the Hungarian writer and the president of the World PEN centre at that time, György Konrád (1994) and the Serbian literary giants Miloš Crnjanski (1993) and Aleksandar Tišma (2004).

He is married and has two children.

Cultural offices
Preceded by Svetlana Jančić	Director of National Library of Serbia; 2015–2019	Succeeded by Vladimir Pištalo
