= Vidosav Stevanović =

Serbian novelist, writer, poet, playwright, and publicist

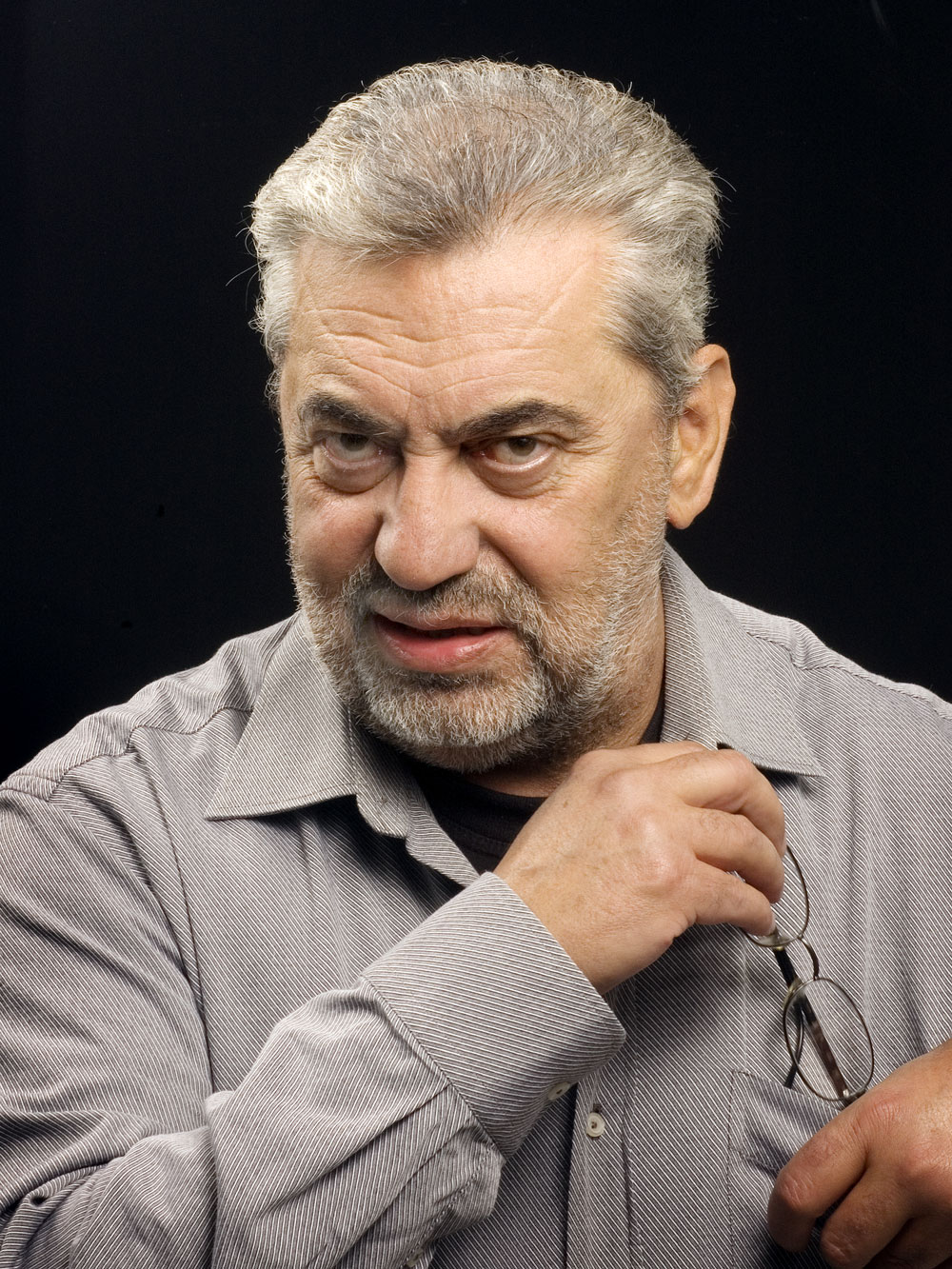
- Born: 27 June 1942 (age 84); Cvetojevac, (near Kragujevac) Nazi-occupied Serbia
- Occupations: Writer and publicist

Vidosav Stevanović (Serbian Cyrillic: Видосав Стевановић; born 27 June 1942) is a Serbian novelist, writer, poet, playwright, and publicist. He has written over thirty literary works, including a political biography of Slobodan Milošević. Stevanović was a writer for European newspapers such as Le Monde, Liberation, El País and Expressen.

During the 1990s, Stevanović was among the intellectuals who resisted Milošević's policies and consolidation of power. This resulted in Stevanović living in exile. He lived in Paris but briefly returned to his home country in 1996. In 2004 he left Paris and went to Sarajevo. In 2007 he returned to Kragujevac.

== Works ==
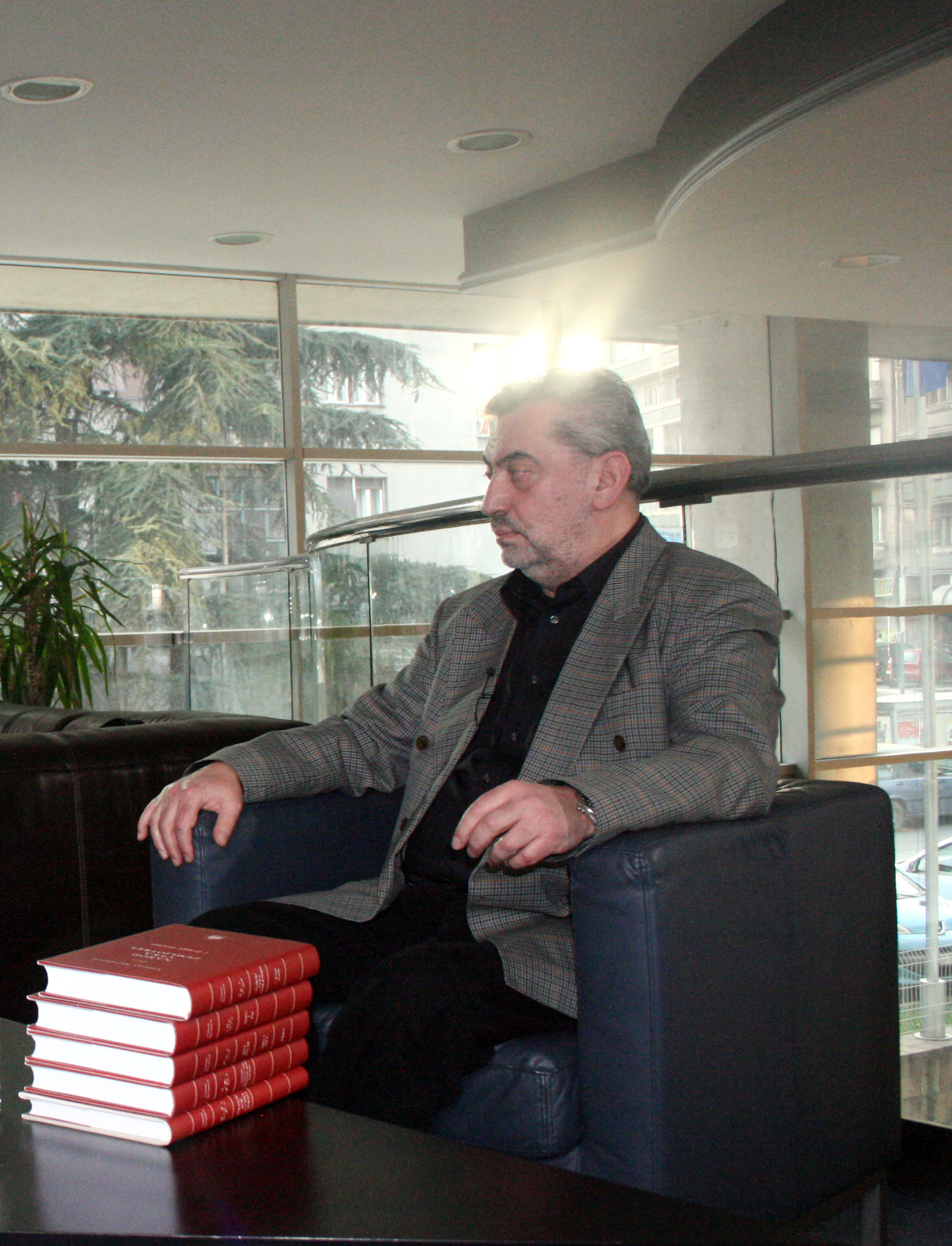
Vidosav Stevanović

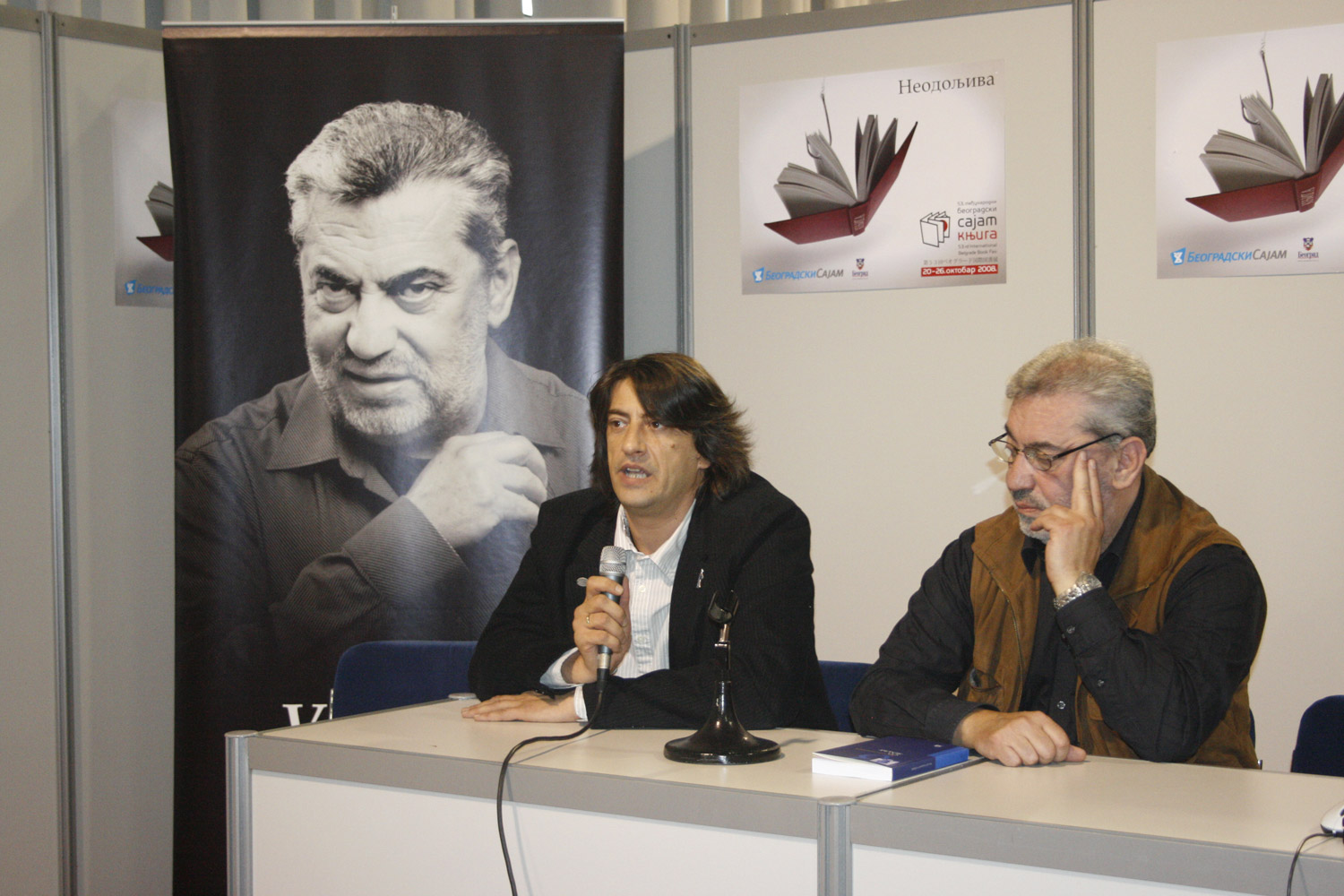
Vidosav Stevanović and Saša Milenić, Belgrade Book Fair, 2008

Stevanović published his first and only collection of poems, Trublje in 1967, in Belgrade. His second book was a collection of stories, The Scum of Death, published in 1969. Two years later he brought out his first novel, Nišći, followed two years later by Konstantin Gorča. These were followed by two-story collections, Suburban Dragons (1978) and The Cesarean Section (1984), which was awarded the Andrić Prize.

Perhaps his most popular work is the novel The Will for which in 1987 he received the Serbian Nin Literary Award.

Later works have included:

- The Circle of Love (1988)
- Snow in Athens (1992)
- The Balkan Island (1993)
- Christ and Dogs (1994)
- The Same Thing (1995)
- Abel and Lise (2001)
- Milosevic: The People's Tyrant (2001)
- Sybil (2004)
- Demons (2004)
- The Stranger who is Staying with You (2008)
- Totally Consternated by that Night Monster (2008)
- Iskra (2008)

He has three as yet unpublished works, and two books of his published journals (1988–1993).

He also has written the following plays:

- My Lazar!, Belgrade (1981)
- Tonight is a Night
- Yugoslav Drama Theater, Belgrade (1983)
- The Last Visitor, Scena (1983)
- Our Mother's Suitcase, National Theatre, Belgrade (1984)
- Far Away, Over There, Belgrade, (1985)
- Vuk Stefanovič Karadžić, Belgrade (1987)
- Jovana of the Underground, Paris (1993)
- Ethnic purification, Nota Bene, Paris (1994)
- Three Sister, Paris-Botunje (1996–2001)
- People is Waiting for the Earthquake, Botunje-Paris (1996–2001)
- A Permanent Rehearse, Paris (1988–2001)
- Volter, Volter-Ferne (1999)
- Good Night and Thanks for your Attention, Sarajevo (2004)
- Medea, the Fortune-Teller, Paris-Sarajevo (2006)
- Irena Dubrovna, Botunje (2009)

He wrote two screenplays: My Lazar! and The Balkan Island, with Lordan Zafranović. He is also the author of fifteen radio dramas, numerous literary criticisms, essays and newspaper articles.

== Awards and affiliations ==
- Isidora Sekulić, 1968.
- Mladost, 1970.
- Milan Rakić, 1971.
- Ivo Andrić Award (Yugoslavian, later Serbian literary award), 1985, for his short stories
- NIN Prize (Yugoslavian, later Serbian literary award), 1987, for his novel Testament
- Civis media prize, 1995.
- Ordre des Arts et des Lettres, 1999, top literary honor from French government, for his body of work
- Member of the Liberal Forum, 1989–2000, a liberal political forum advocating democratic reforms in Yugoslavia
- Co-founder, Belgrade Circle (Beogradski Krug), 1989–2000, a community of activist intellectuals opposed to Milošević, war and isolation
