= Goran Petrović =

Serbian writer and academic (1961–2024)

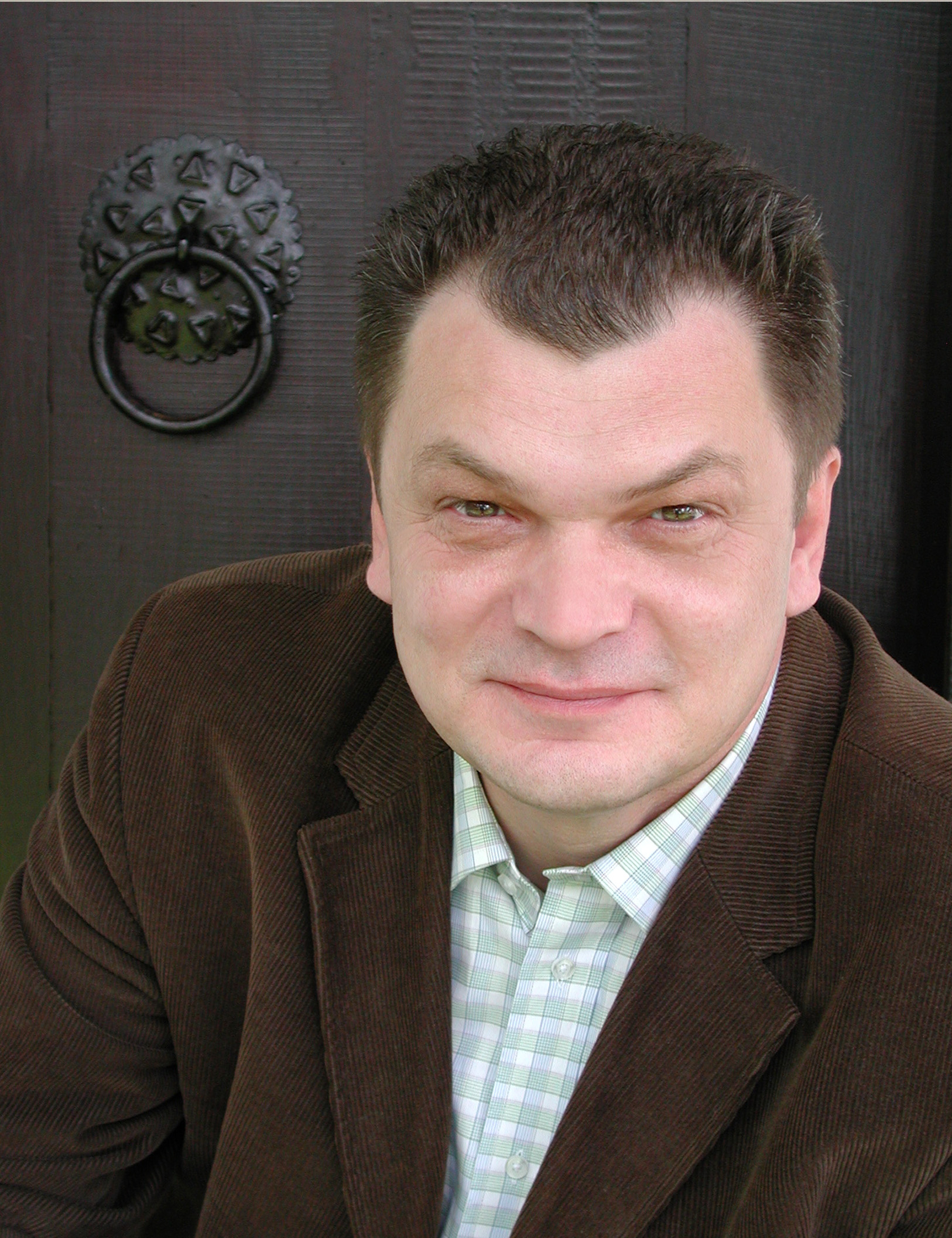
Petrović in 2013

Goran Petrović (pronounced [ɡǒran pětroʋitɕ]; 1 July 1961 – 26 January 2024) was a Serbian writer and academic.

== Biography ==
Goran Petrović was born in Kraljevo, Serbia. He studied Yugoslav and Serbian literature at the University of Belgrade Faculty of Philology. He received the most prominent award in Serbian literature, the NIN Award, in 2000, for his novel Sitničarnica "Kod srećne ruke". Before his death, he worked and lived in Belgrade. Petrović was a member of the Serbian Literary Association, the Serbian PEN Centre and the Serbian Academy of Sciences and Arts.

Petrović published 115 editions and the following books: the short prose pieces Saveti za lakški život (Advices for an Easier Living, 1989), the novel Atlas opisan nebom (Atlas Described by Sky, 1993), the collection of short stories Ostrvo i okolne priče (The Island and Stories Around, 1996), the novel Opsada crkve Svetog Spasa (The Siege of the Church of Holy Salvation, 1997), the novel Sitničarnica "Kod srećne ruke" (Sundries Shop "At Lucky Hands", 2000), the collection of short stories Bližnji (Next of Kin, 2002), the selected short prose book Sve što znam o vremenu (Everything I Know About the Time, 2003), the play Skela (The Ferry, 2004), the collection of short stories Razlike (Differences, 2006), the book of short prose Претраживач (Browser, 2007), the novella Ispod tavanice koja se ljuspa (Below the ceiling that is pealing off, 2010) and the play Matica (The Nut, 2011). Some of his novels and stories have been adapted for theatre, television, and radio. Among them is the novel Siege of the Church of Holy Salvation that was dramatized and directed as a play by Kokan Mladenović at the National Theatre of Sombor.

Petrović’s novels and books of selected stories have been published in over fifty editions translated in languages such as French, German, Russian, Spanish, Italian, Bulgarian, Slovenian, Polish, Ukrainian, Macedonian, English and Dutch. About fifty Petrović’s stories have been published separately in Russian, English, French, Spanish, German, Polish, Czech, Greek, Ukrainian, Bulgarian, Slovenian, Macedonian, Belarusian, Hungarian, while about twenty have been included into anthologies of Serbian short stories in country and abroad.

Petrović died on 26 January 2024, at the age of 62.

== Awards ==
Goran Petrović received many awards and prizes including the NIN Award for the Novel of the Year, the Andrić Prize, the Meša Selimović Award, the scholarship for literature from the Borislav Pekić Foundation, Prosveta Award, Serbian National Library Award for the most read book of the year, Golden Bestseller Award, Borisav Stanković Award.

== Works ==
- Saveti za lakši život (1989)
- Atlas opisan nebom (1993)
- Ostrvo i okolne priče (1996)
- Opsada crkve Svetog Spasa (1997)
- Sitničarnica Kod srećne ruke (2000)
- Bližnji (2002)
- Sve što znam o vremenu (2003)
- Skela (2004)
- Razlike (2006)
- Pretraživač (2007)
- Ispod tavanice koja se ljuspa (2010)
- Matica (2011)
- Unutrašnje dvorište (2018)
- Papir sa vodenim znakom (2022)
- Ikonostas (2022)
