= Dragan Velikić =

Serbian writer and diplomat

- Драган Великић
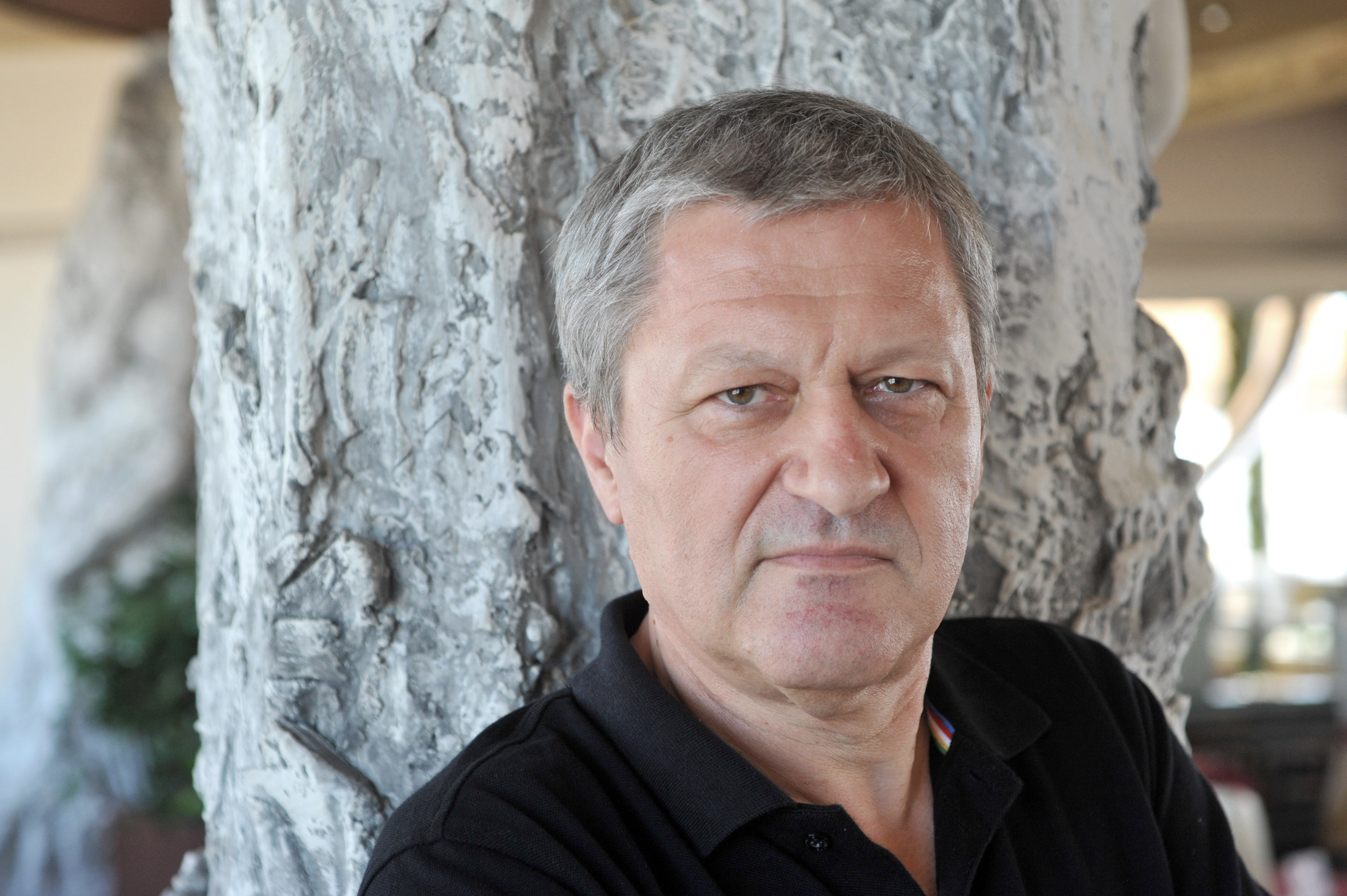
- Photo of Velikić, 2018
- Born: 3 July 1953 (age 73); Belgrade, PR Serbia, FPR Yugoslavia
- Education: Faculty of Philology in Belgrade
- Occupations: writer, publicist, ambassador
- Awards: NIN award Vilenica International Literary Prize

Dragan Velikić (Serbian Cyrillic: Драган Великић; born 7 July 1953) is a Serbian novelist, short story writer, essayist and former Ambassador to Austria. He's one of the best known writers of modern Serbia.

His influences include Gaito Gazdanov, Mikhail Bulgakov, Constantine P. Cavafy, Ivo Andrić and Aleksandar Tišma among other authors.

Velkić's best known works are the novels Ruski prozor (The Russian Window) and Islednik (The Investigator), both of which won the NIN Award.

In 2017, he signed the Declaration on the Common Language of the Croats, Serbs, Bosniaks and Montenegrins.

In mid-1970s, Velikić was shortly a keyboardist for the popular rock band Pop Mašina.

== Works ==
=== Novels ===
- Via Pula (1988)
- Astragan (1991)
- Hamsin 51 (1993)
- Severni zid (1995)
- Danteov trg (1997)
- Slučaj Bremen (2001)
- Dosije Domaševski (2003)
- Ruski prozor (2007). The Russian Window, trans. Randall A. Major (Geopoetika Publishing, 2010). Winner of the NIN Award.
- Bonavia (2012)
- Islednik (2015). The Investigator, trans. Christina Pribićević-Zorić (Istros Books, 2025). Winner of the NIN Award.
- Adresa (2019)
- Hamsin 51 (2022)
- Bečki roman (2024)

=== Short stories ===
- Pogrešan pokret (1983)
- Staklena bašta (1985)
- Beograd i druge priče (2009)

=== Essays ===
- Yu-Atlantida (1993)
- Deponija (1994)
- Stanje stvari (1998)
- Pseća pošta (2006)
- O piscima i gradovima (2010)
- Bratstvo po mrlji (2018)
- Soko zove Lastu (2022)
