= Darko Tuševljaković =

Serbian writer

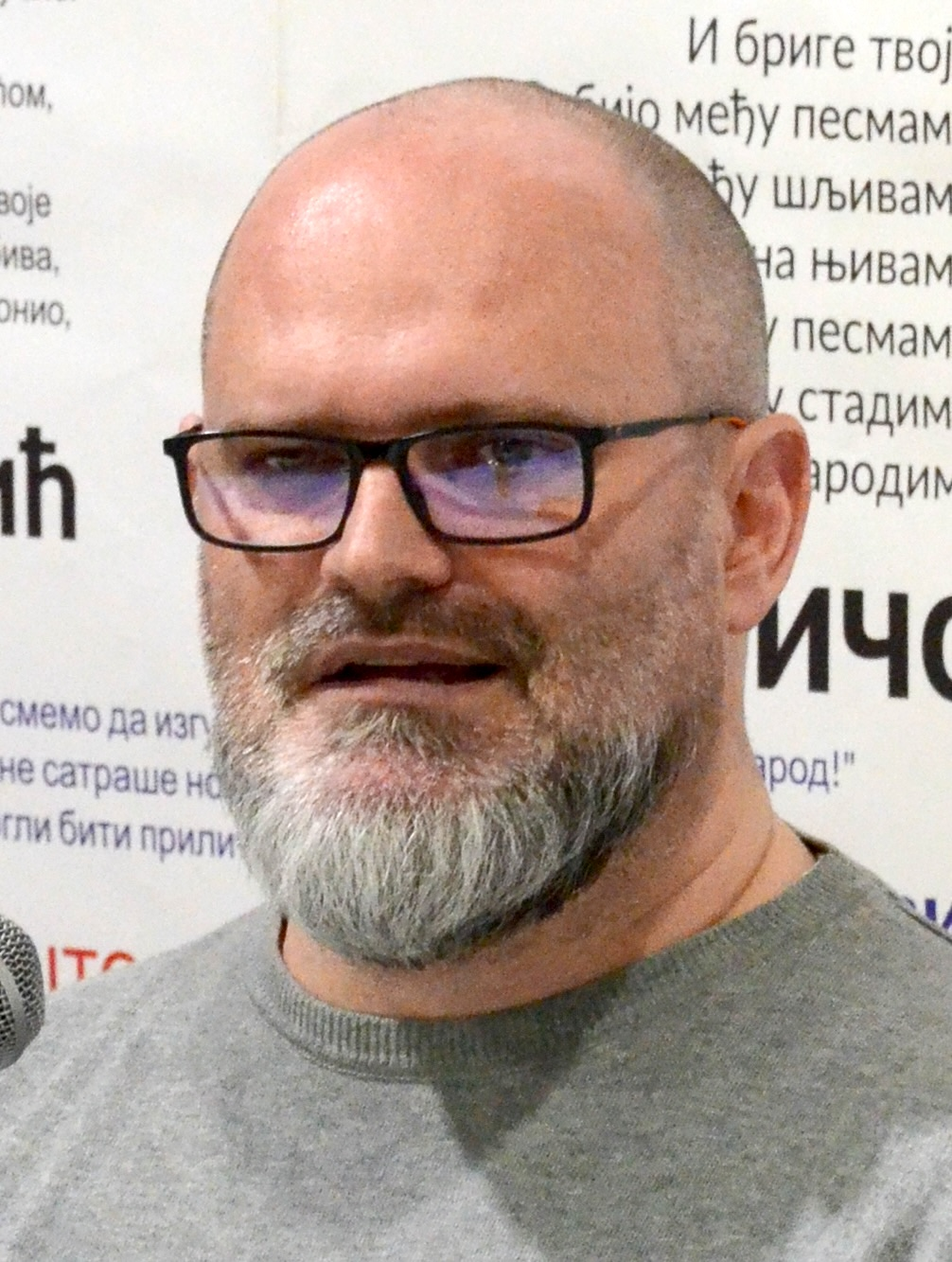
- Tuševljaković in 2026
- Writing career
- Notable awards: EUPL (2017); Andrić Prize (2023)

Darko Tuševljaković is a Serbian writer.

== Biography ==
The author of eight books, he is best known for his 2016 novel Jaz (The Chasm) which won the European Union Prize for Literature in 2017. It was also shortlisted for Serbia's leading literary prize, the NIN Award. His 2025 novel Karota (Carota) was awarded with NIN Award.

In 2023 he received prestigious Andrić Prize for his collection of stories Hangar za snove (Hangar for Dreams).

Tuševljaković lives in Belgrade.
