= Grozdana Olujić =

Serbian writer, translator, and literary critic (1934–2019)

Grozdana Olujić Гроздана Олујић
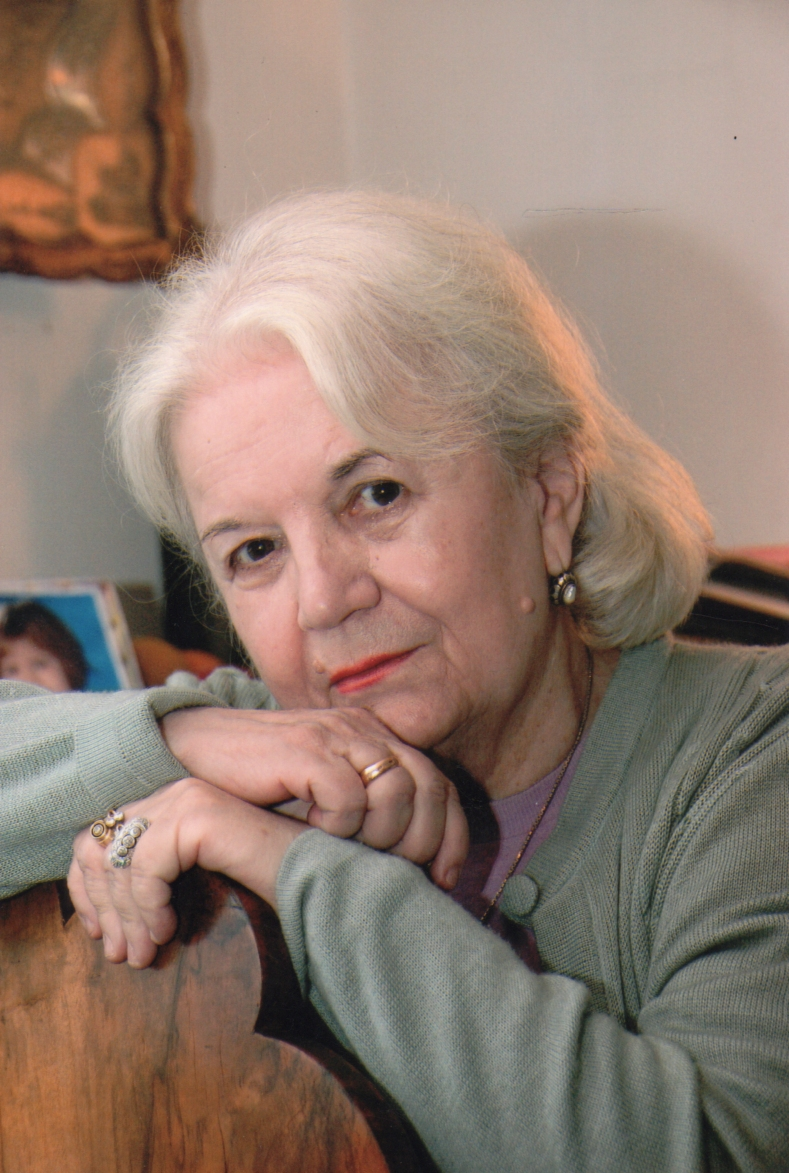
- Born: 30 August 1934; Erdevik, Kingdom of Yugoslavia
- Died: 16 March 2019 (aged 84); Belgrade, Serbia
- Education: University of Belgrade Faculty of Philology
- Occupations: Writer; translator; editor; critic
- Website: www.grozdanaolujic.net

Grozdana Olujić (Serbian Cyrillic: Гроздана Олујић, 30 August 1934 – 16 March 2019) was a Serbian writer, translator, editor and critic. Her novels and fairy tales collections have been translated in more than 35 languages. Her awards include the Andrić Award, Zmaj Children Games Award, and Bora Stanković Award.

== Biography ==
Olujić graduated and received a master's degree in English and English literature at the Faculty of Philology of the University of Belgrade. Her first novel, Walk to Heaven (Izlet u nebo) was released in 1958, when the writer was 24 years old. The book became a bestseller and was translated into several European languages and received an award of Narodna prosvjeta publishing house for the best novel of Yugoslavia. The novel was adapted for the stage, and in 1962, based on the book, the film director Jovan Živanović shot the melodrama Čudna devojka.

The novels Vote for love (Glasam za ljubav), Do not wake a sleeping dog (Ne budi zaspale pse) and Wild seed (Divlje seme) published in the 60s approved Grozdana Olujić as one of the leading authors of Yugoslav literature. Wild seed won favourable critics and was highly prized in USA and became obligatory literature at several universities.

The novel The Game (Igra) from the collection African Violet (Afrička ljubičica), published in 1985, received the main prize of an international competition in Arnsberg. Almost all the stories from the collection were translated into foreign languages and included in anthologies of short prose around the world including Germany, USA, Ukraine, Russia, Israel, India, Great Britain, France, etc. In 2009, the writer's novel Voices in the Wind (Glasovi u vetru) became the winner of NIN Award, the main literary award of Serbia.

Grozdana Olujić is the author of several popular books for children and youth. The collection of fairy tales The Magic Broom was published in the USSR in 1985 with 100,000 copies.

Olujić also translated a number of works into Serbian; she translated from Polish Fairy tales of the southern wind by Danuta Cirlić-Straszyńska and works of Saul Bellow, Amrita Pritam, William Kennedy, Arnold Wesker, Yukio Mishima and others. She died at 16 March 2019 in Belgrade.

Israeli critic and essayist Dina Katan Ben-Cion, speaking about the novel Voice in the Wind, said that "Only Serbian literature has its One hundred years of solitude."

Olujić is also known for her essays, including works on Kafka, Thomas Wolfe, Marcel Proust, Virginia Woolf and Poetics of fairy tales.

== Awards ==
She was decorated Order of the Dannebrog, made an honorary citizen of Oslo and won numerous awards including the NIN award, the World Congress for Art and Culture for the best modern fairy tale in 1994, the Great Ivo Andrić Award, the Zmaj Children Games Award and Bora Stanković Award.

== Works ==
- Izlet u nebo, 1957.
- Glasam za ljubav, 1962.
- Ne budi zaspale pse, 1964.
- Divlje seme, 1967.
- Sedefna ruža i druge bajke, 1979.
- Nebeska reka i druge bajke, 1984.
- Afrička ljubičice, 1984.
- Zvezdane lutalice, 1987.
- Dečak i princeza, 1990.
- Princ oblaka, 1990.
- Zlatni tanjir i druge bajke, 1998.
- Mesečev cvet, 1998.
- Svetlosna vrata, 2002.
- Kamen koji je leteo i druge bajke, 2002.
- Snežni cvet i druge bajke, 2004.
- Jastuk koji je pamtio snove i druge, 2007.
- Glasovi u vetru, 2009.
- Preživeti do sutra, 2017.
- Bili su deca kao i ti, 2017.
