= Zoran Ćirić =

Zoran Ćirić (Serbian Cyrillic: Зоран Ћирић) (born in 1962) is a writer from Niš, Serbia. He writes poetry and prose.

Ćirić received the NIN award in 2001 for his novel Hobo.

== Novels ==
- Prisluškivanje (2000)
- Hobo (2001)
- Smrt u El Pasu (2003)
- Slivnik (2004)
- Gang of Four (2005)
- Noć svih svetih (2009)
- Lanac slobode (2019)
