= Dobrilo Nenadić =

Serbian and Yugoslav novelist (1940–2019)

- Добрило Ненадић
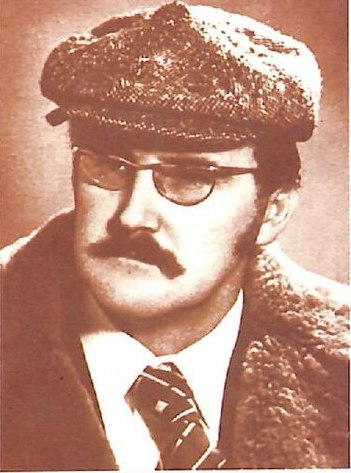
- Dobrilo Nenadić on a cover of a book (2007).
- Born: 23 October 1940; Vinogošte near Arilje, Kingdom of Yugoslavia
- Died: 15 August 2019 (aged 78); Vinogošte near Arilje, Serbia
- Education: University of Belgrade
- Occupations: Novelist; Agriculturist
- Writing career
- Language: Serbian, Serbo-Croatian

Dobrilo Nenadić (Serbian: Добрило Ненадић, 1940–2019), Serbian novelist, mainly known for his historical novels set in Serbian history.

== Biography ==
Dobrilo Nenadić was born in the village of Vinogošt near Arilje, Kingdom of Yugoslavia, on October 23, 1940. He graduated agriculture from the University of Belgrade, and worked as an agriculturist apart from his literary work. He died in his birthplace on August 15, 2019.

=== Literary work ===
Dobrilo Nenadić published 17 novels between 1977 and 2013, some with contemporary themes, and some with historical themes. He gained critical acclaim in Serbia for his historical novels Dorotej (1977), Novel about Obilić (1990) and Despot and Sacrifice (1998), all set in medieval Serbia. He also published a trilogy of novels set during Serbian-Ottoman Wars of late 19. century - Sabre of Count Vronski (2002), Victors (2004) and Grumpiness of Prince Bizmark (2005), as well as a standalone novel about the fall of the Obrenović dynasty in May Coup - Ermine (2006). In 2009. he published historical novel Iron Age, set in prehistorical Europe.

His novel Dorotej was made into film of the same name in 1981: Dobrilo Nenadić was credited for his work on the screenplay.

== Awards ==
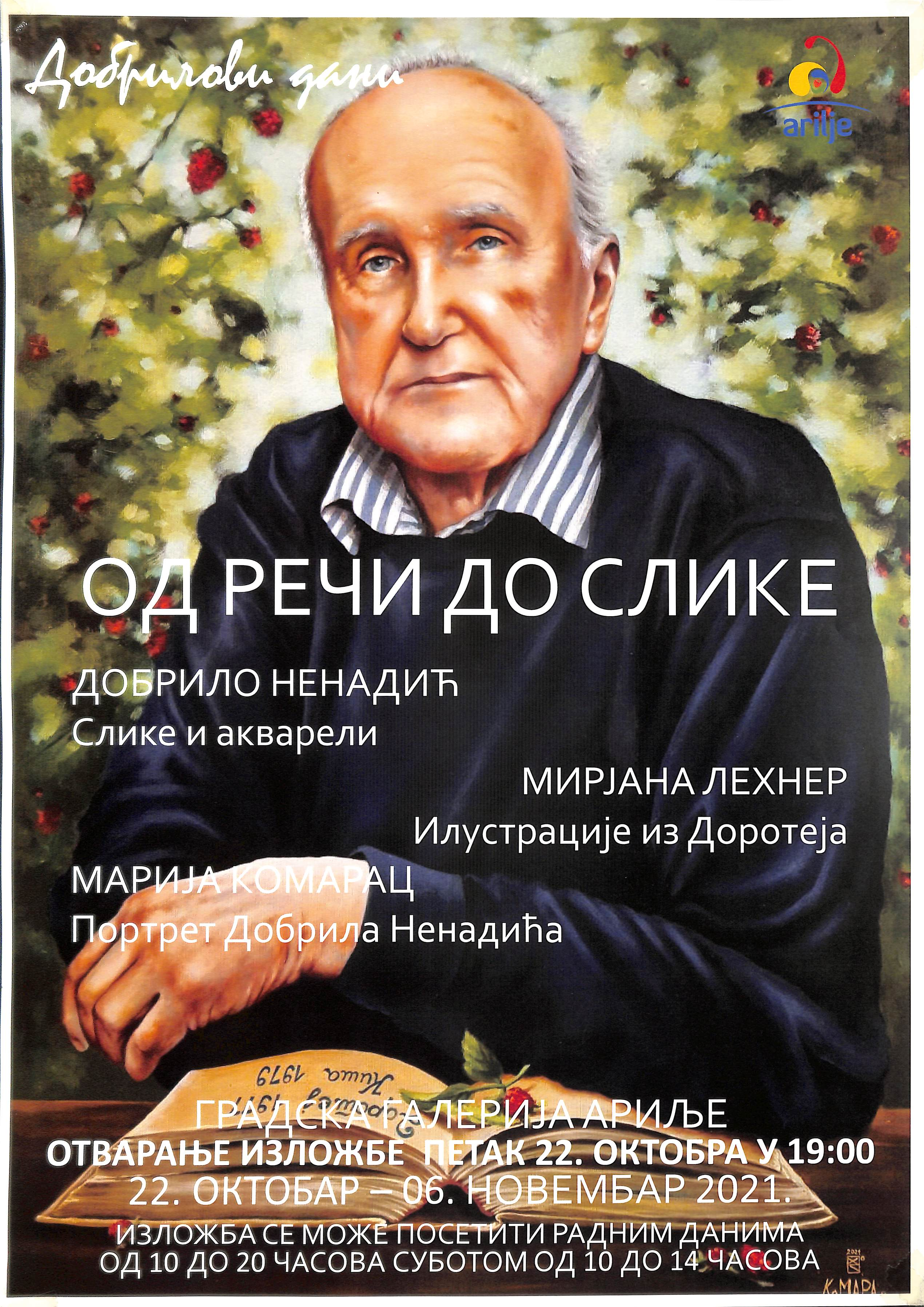
Dobrilo Nenadić's picture on a poster (2021).

Nenadić won several literary awards in SFRJ and Serbia:

- National Library of Serbia Award for the most popular book, for his novels Dorotej (1978) and Despot and Sacrifice (1999).
- Meša Selimović Award, for his novel Despot and Sacrifice (1998).
- Prosveta Award, for his novel Despot and Sacrifice (1998).
- Golden Bestseller Award, for his novels Despot and Sacrifice (1998) and Brajan (2000).
- Rača Charter for historical novels, for his novel Brajan.
- Biblios Award in 2000. and 2001, for his entire work.
- Svetozar Ćorović Award, for his novel Victors (2005).
- Bora Stanković Award, for his novel Grumpiness of Prince Bizmark (2006).
