= Pavle Ugrinov =

Serbian writer, playwright, director and academic

Pavle Ugrinov (real name Vasilije Popović; 15 April 1926 – 23 June 2007) was a Serbian writer, playwright, director and academic.

== Biography ==
He attended primary school in various places in Vojvodina and finished high school in Petrograd, today's Zrenjanin.

He enrolled at the Faculty of Economics in Belgrade in 1946. After two years of study, he enrolled at the newly established Academy of Theater and Film in Belgrade, where he graduated in 1952 from the Department of Directing in the class of professor Dr. Hugo Klein. After graduating, he worked for a while in theatre directing and theory. He was one of the founders of the chamber stage of Atelje 212 in Belgrade. With his staging of the play Waiting for Godot by Samuel Beckett, the stage of that theatre was ceremoniously opened. He also worked as the editor of the drama and serial program of Radio Television of Serbia in Belgrade.

He entered the literary life in 1955 with the poem Bačka zapevka, for which, together with Aleksandar Tišma, he received the Branko Award for poetry. He then devoted himself entirely to writing prose and essays.

He wrote a total of 21 books, including novels: "Departure at Dawn" (1957), Kopno (Nolit, 1959),"Garden" (1967), "Elements" (1968), Senzacije (1970),Domaja (1971),Zadat život (1979),Carstvo zemaljsko (1982),Otac i sin (1986),Tople pedesete (1990);Ishodište (novella, 1963), Fascinacije (1980),"Dictionary of Elements" (1972), Egzistencija (Prosveta, 1996),Ljubav i dobrota (1998),Van sveta (Prosveta, 1999),Besudni dani (Narodna knjiga, 2001),Bez ljubavi (2002),Pogled preko svega (Agora, 2004)Snovi o Kosani (short story, 2005),Savon de fleurs: milo od cveća (2007). He also wrote several stage adaptations, television and radio dramas, essays, studies and reviews.

He was a member of the Main Board of Sterija Pozorje, a member of the JDP Council, a member of the Presidency of the Serbian Writers' Association, a member of the Council of the Museum of Contemporary Art in Belgrade, a member of the BITEF Council and numerous other cultural institutions and events. He was the president of the council of the Chronicle of Matica Srpska and a permanent member and an associate of that same institution.

He won the Branko Award (1955), the NIN Award for Novel (1979), the October Award of Belgrade (1983), the Nolit Award (1990) and the Andrić Prize (1995). He was awarded the Order of Merit for the People with Silver Rays (1976) and the Order of the Republic with a Silver Wreath (1988). He was elected a regular member of SANU on 29 May 1991.

He died on 23 June 2007 in Belgrade at the age of 82.

== Television plays ==
- 1960: "The Island of Peace," a TV movie;
- 1962: "Koštana", a TV movie;
- 1962: "Mandragola", a TV movie;
- 1969: "Uninvited", a TV movie;
- 1969: "Over the Dead", a TV movie.
