= Saša Ilić (writer, born 1972) =

Serbian writer

- Саша Илић
- Born: Saša Ilić; 9 October 1972; Jagodina
- Education: University of Belgrade
- Occupation: Writer
- Writing career
- Language: Serbo-Croatian
- Years active: 1995–

Saša Ilić (Serbian: Саша Илић; born 9 October 1972) is a Serbian writer.

== Works ==
Most of Ilić's early works were published in the magazine Reč, where he debuted in January 1995. In 1998, he co-authored a book titled Odyssey with Dragan Bošković. In 2000, he published the prose book Premonition of a Civil War, the first book in the Reč edition.

His novel Berlin Window, for which he received a scholarship from the Borislav Pekić Foundation, was shortlisted for the NIN Award in 2005.

In 2015, he published two collections of stories, Dušanovac Stop, which won a special recognition for its graphic design at the Belgrade Book Fair, and Urchin Hunt. In 2017, he signed the Declaration on the Common Language of the Croats, Serbs, Bosniaks and Montenegrins. In 2019 his novel The Dog and the Double Bass won the NIN Award.

=== Novels ===
- Берлинско окно, (Berlin Window, 2005).
- Пад Колумбије (The Fall of Columbia, 2010).
- Пас и контрабас (The Dog and the Double Bass, 2019).
- Рт (The Cape, 2025).

=== Short stories ===
- Предосећање грађанског рата (Premonition of a Civil War, 2005).
- Душановац. Пошта (Dušanovac Stop, 2015).
- Лов на јежеве (Urchin Hunt, 2015).
