= Academic ranks in Serbia =

Academic ranks in Serbia are the titles, relative importance and power of professors, researchers, and administrative personnel held in academia.
