= Vladislav Bajac =

Serbian writer, poet, journalist and publisher

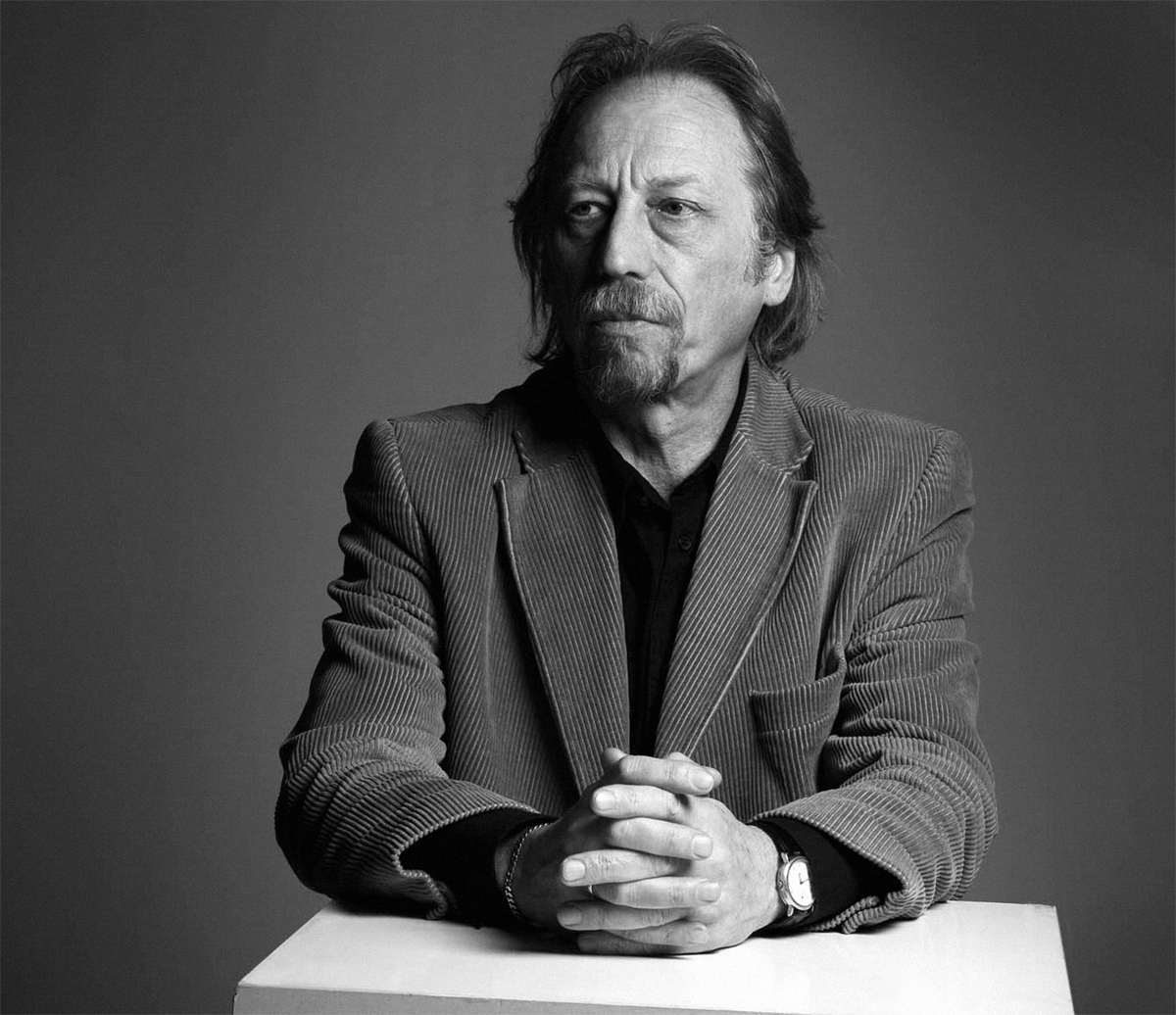
Vladislav Bajac, 2011

Vladislav Bajac (Serbian Cyrillic: Владислав Бајац, born 2 June 1954) is a Serbian writer, poet, journalist and publisher.

== Biography ==
He was born in Belgrade in 1954 and later studied philology at the University of Belgrade. In 1993, he founded the publishing house Geopoetika, which publishes fiction as well as nonfiction books about history, art, rock & roll, and archeology. Geopoetika has published Serbian Prose in Translation, a collection of Serbian books translated into English. His books were translated into twenty languages. His best-known work is his 2008 novel, Hamam Balkanija, for which he won the International Literature Prize Balkanika. Its chapters alternate between two timelines, both of which use characters based on real people. The contemporary timeline is a collection of vignettes in autobiographical first person narration told from Bajac's point of view. In the original edition it was printed in the Cyrillic script, and people such as Alberto Manguel and Allen Ginsberg appear alongside the author. The earlier timeline consists of a single story set in the sixteenth century, using omniscient third person narration, featuring the Grand Vizier of the Ottoman Empire and Suleiman the Magnificent. That story was originally printed in the Latin alphabet. The book's themes, and its dual structure and narrative styles, raise questions about where identity comes from and how it is shaped by religion and national history.

In 2017, Bajac has signed the Declaration on the Common Language of the Croats, Serbs, Bosniaks and Montenegrins.

== Works ==
Poetry

- Which way Leads To People, 1972
- The Path of Haiku, 1988

Short Stories

- Europe On the Bull’s Back, 1988
- Dream Coasters (Geopoetical Fables), 1992
- Gastronomadic Stories, 2012

Novels

- The Book of Bamboo, 1989
- The Black Box (An Utopia On Subsequent Reality), 1993
- The Druid of Sindidun, 1998
- Escape from Biography (A Life under Eight Names), 2001
- Europe Express (A Novel In Short Stories), 2003
- Hamam Balkania (A Novel and Other Stories), 2008
- Chronicles of Doubt, 2016

   Empty Shot, 2024

English editions

- Hamam Balkania, Belgrade, Geopoetika, 2009
- Hamam Balkania, Blooming Twig Books, New York & Tulsa, 2014
- Hamam Balkania, Istros Books, London, 2014

== Awards ==
- Dimitrije Mitrinovic Award (for the excellence in writing), Belgrade, Serbia, 2015.
- Special Book Award of China, Beijing (for the Chinese culture contribution to the world), 2014.
- Haiku awards at The International Itoen Haiku Poetry Contest, Tokyo, Japan, in both 1991. and 1993.
- Stevan Pesic Award for the best 1995 prose book in 1996 for the revised edition
- Borislav Pekic Foundation Prize for the best manuscript in 1993'
- The 6th April Award (The Book Day) proclaimed by The Serbian Literary Union and Belgrade City Assembly as the best novel on (ancient) Belgrade in 1998.
- The Golden Best-Seller Award for the Top ten best-selling books in 1999.
- Branko Copic Foundation Award (Serbian Academy of Science and Art) for the best book in 1998.
- Proclaimed as "The Novel of the Year" (1998) by Vecernje Novosti (Evening Daily News).
- Award for one of ten best-selling books in 2001
- International Award for Collected Prose Work, Macedonia, 2003
- International Balkanika Award for the best book on the Balkans in 2007/2008, International jury
- Isidora Sekulić Award for the best book in Serbia in 2008
- Hit Liber Award for one of ten Best-selling books in 2008
- Kocicevo pero Award, Bosnia and Herzegovina, 2010
- Petar Kocic Award for the excellence in writing, Banjaluka, Bosnia and Herzegovina, 2010
- Ramonda Serbica Award for Lifetime achievement in literature and for contribution to literature and culture, Nis, Serbia, 2012
- Prozart Award for affirmation of Balkan literature, PRO-ZA Balkan Festival, Skopje, Macedonia, 2013
