= Muharem Bazdulj =

Serbian and Bosnian writer

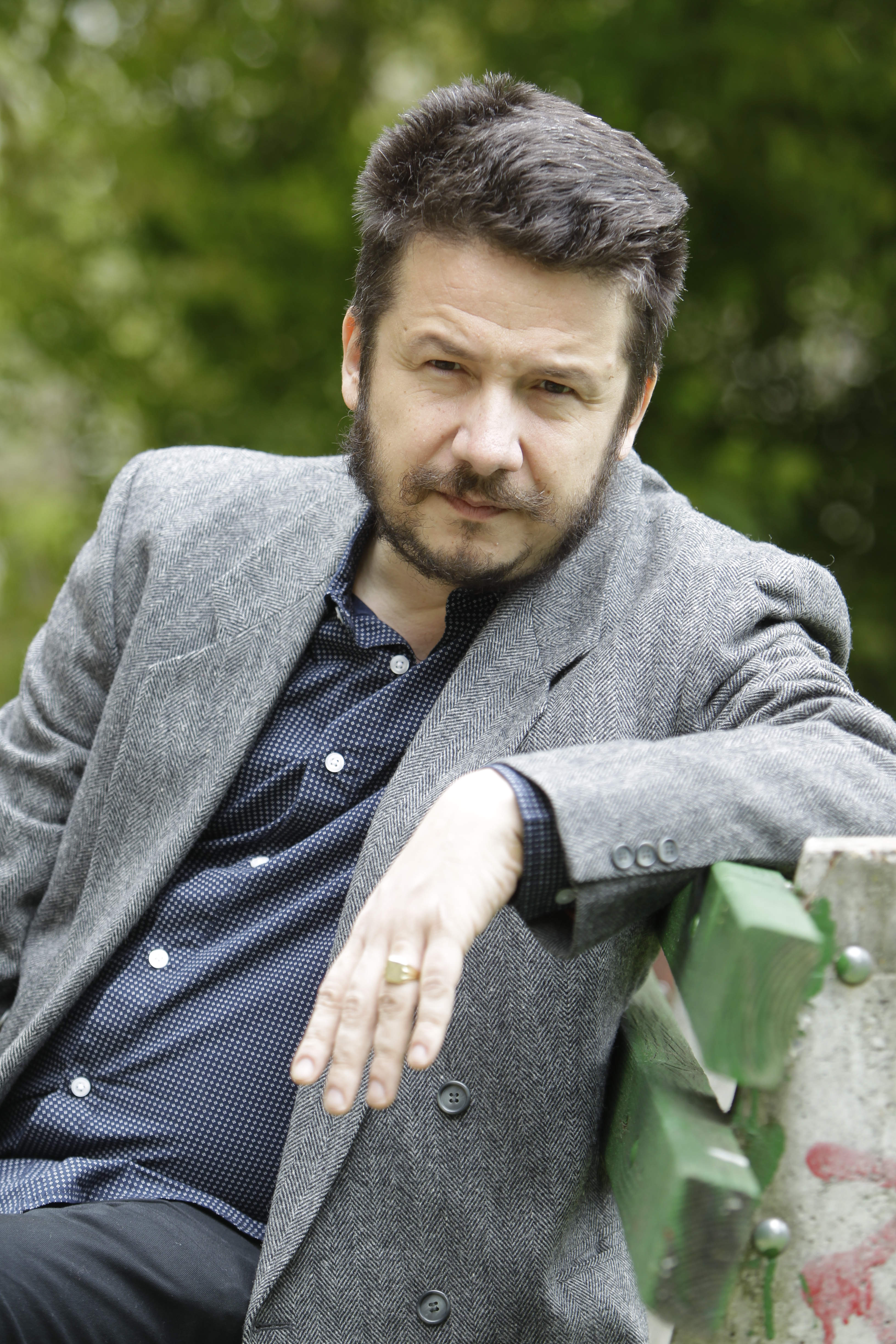
- Bazdulj in 2017
- Born: 19 May 1977 (age 49); Travnik, SR Bosnia and Herzegovina, SFR Yugoslavia
- Education: University of Sarajevo Faculty of Philosophy
- Occupation: Writer

Muharem Bazdulj (Serbian Cyrillic: Мухарем Баздуљ; born 19 May 1977) is a Bosnian and Serbian writer and journalist. His work of historical fiction Byron and the Beauty has been translated into English by John K Cox.

== Biography ==
He was born on 19 May 1977 in Travnik, he graduated and obtained his master's degree in English, English literature and American literature at the Faculty of Philosophy in Sarajevo. His mother is Nura Bazdulj-Hubijar, popular writer, and father Dr. Salih Bazdulj, both award-winning literary authors from Travnik. Muharem Bazdulj publishes literary and journalistic texts in many magazines and newspapers in Bosnia and Herzegovina, Serbia and the region. His books have been translated and published in German, English and Polish, and his stories and essays in a dozen other languages. All of his works are written in Serbian language.

By January 2018, he had published seven novels, five books of stories, three books of columns, two books of essays, and one book of sonnets.

Muharem Bazdulj's writing is highly esteemed in BiH and Serbia. In 2014, he won the two highest Serbian journalistic awards: the Danas award "Stanislav Staša Marinković", which is awarded for journalistic courage and special achievements in investigative and analytical journalism, and the "Bogdan Tirnanić" award of the Association of Journalists of Serbia, for best column or comment. Before that, in 2013, he received the award of the Association of Journalists of BiH for "the best journalist in the category of print media".

Until 2009, he was a journalist for the BH Dani magazine, and until 2012, he was the deputy editor-in-chief of the Sarajevo daily Oslobođenje. He has been living and working in Serbia since 2012. He is a citizen of Serbia. In 2016, as a sign of personal protest, he left the editorial office of the Belgrade magazine Vreme, in which he had been publishing since 2003.

He has criticized Balkan liberal circles for "promoting Anti-Serb views". In May 2021, Bazdulj was recorded partying with Nobel Prize laureate Peter Handke and two-time Palme d'Or winner Emir Kusturica in the Bosnian town of Višegrad for which he was roundly condemned in his native Bosnia and Herzegovina, owing to the perceived Serb nationalist sympathies of his associates and accusations of their having engaged in Bosnian Genocide denial.

In July 2021, Bazdulj was elected member of the Executive Board of the Radio Television of Serbia (RTS).

He is married and has one child.

As of 2022, he has contributed to Serbian branch of RT, a Russian state-owned propaganda network.

== Bibliography ==
- One Like a Song (stories)
- Second book (stories)
- Concert (novel)
- Jaur and Zulejha (novel)
- Jobs and Days (essays)
- Heroes (sonnets)
- Transit, Comet, Eclipse (novel)
- Magic (stories)
- Filigree Sidewalks
- Sowing Salt (novel)
- April on Vlašić (novel)
- Little Window (novel)
- And Others / They Sang About the War (essays)
- Heresy of Nominalism
- Marzipan Doll (novel)
- Travnik Trinity (stories)
- Karlovac Peace
- From Time to Time
- The Last Man
