= Vladimir Pištalo =

Serbian American writer (born 1960)

Vladimir Pištalo Ph.D.
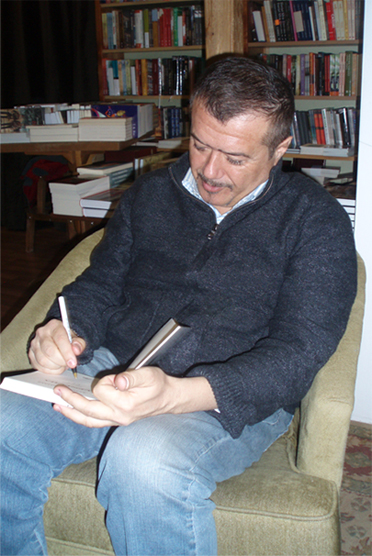
- Pištalo in 2012
- Born: 8 May 1960 (age 66); Sarajevo, PR Bosnia and Herzegovina, FPR Yugoslavia
- Occupation: Writer
- Writing career
- Period: 1981–present
- Notable work: Tesla: A Portrait with Masks

Vladimir Pištalo (Serbian Cyrillic: Владимир Пиштало, pronounced [ʋlǎdimiːr pǐʃtalo]; born 8 May 1960) is a Serbian American writer, most notably winning the NIN Award for novel of the year in 2008.

In 2021, he became the director of the National Library of Serbia.

== Biography ==
Pištalo graduated from the University of Belgrade's Faculty of Law and earned his doctorate at the University of New Hampshire under the theme of the manifold identity of Serbian immigrants. Pištalo was a faculty member at Becker College in Worcester, Massachusetts, where he taught World and American history.

He grew up in Mostar, Kraljevo and Belgrade and emigrated to the United States in 1993.

== Published books ==
=== Prose ===
- Slikovnica (1981)
- Noći (1986)
- Manifesti (1986)
- Kraj veka (1990)
- A Novel: Corto Maltese (1987)
- Tesla: A Portrait with Masks (2008)

=== Short story collections ===
- Vitraž u sećanju (1994)
- Priče iz celog sveta (1997)
- A biography of Alexander the Great (1999)

=== Novels ===
- Milenijum u Beogradu (2000)
- O čudu (2002)
