= Milica Mićić Dimovska =

Serbian writer (1947 – 2013)

- Born: 3 April 1947; Novi Sad, FPR Yugoslavia
- Died: 5 October 2013 (aged 66); Subotica, Serbia
- Occupation: Writer
- Awards: Andrić Prize

Milica Mićić Dimovska (Serbian Cyrillic: Милица Мићић Димовска; 1947 – 2013) was a Serbian writer. She has written numerous novels and collections of short stories and won a number of awards. Her works have been translated into English, Hungarian, Italian, Polish, Slovak, and Swedish.

== Personal life ==
While Dimovska spent most of her life in Novi Sad, she studied literature in Belgrade, at the University of Belgrade. Her first publications came in the 1970s. While in Belgrade, she became very closely connected with a group of writers whose style was considered “new style fiction” (proza novog stila) or “hard-boiled fiction” (stvarnosna proza). This group focused their works on the people in the “social margin”, often women, yet Mićić Dimovska was almost the only woman in the literary circle.

== Style ==
The Stvarnosna Proza that characterized her early works focuses on characters on the social margin in post Yugoslavian culture. Especially in Mićić Dimovska's work, the main characters are usually women, though she denies formal association with Feminism. As is true with Mićić Dimovska, the writers in Stvarnosna Proza were particularly interested in the everyday experiences of their characters, evidenced by the use of jargon in narration. Stvarnosna Proza followed these characters in the Post-Yugoslav world that didn't necessarily follow through on the promise of post-socialism prosperity. Writers of the movement used females as a vehicle for advancing their views about the poor treatment of marginalized members of their society. Usually, this meant women were portrayed stereotypically, as victims or as people with uncontrollable sexuality. Though they largely used women to convey their messages, it certainly was not a completely positive movement for women in Eastern Europe.

Dimovska generally uses third-person narration, focalization, and internal monologue. She often switches between third-person omniscient narration and internal thought process, allowing for a smooth transition when she switches focus from character to character. This structure allows for many different views of the same event to be related to the reader and is employed extensively in The Cataract, for example.

=== Characters ===
Dimovska's main characters are usually women experiencing the disconnect between progress for the country and progress for the individual. However, rather than using women as a literary device, Mićić Dimovska examines their lives for the sake of illustrating the reality of their experiences. Usually the protagonists are working, middle-class women living in an urban setting. Often, the story revolves around the main characters' familial ties. An important theme is how these women deal with the lasting patriarchy and the roles to which society forces women to conform. She often gives her characters sharp observational skills. Starting with the body, her characters are acutely aware of themselves, their surroundings, and of the climate they are in.

== Books ==
Mićić Dimovska wrote several collections of short stories: Priče o ženi (Stories about a Woman), 1972; Poznanici (Acquaintances), 1980; Odmrzavanje (Defrosting), 1991; U Procepu (In the Cleft), 1999. Her novels include: Utvare (Phantoms), 1987; Poslednji zanosi MSS (The Last Ecstasies of MSS), 1996; Mrena (The Cataract), 2002; Utočište (Refuge), 2005.

=== The Cataract ===
Set in Novi Sad in the 1999, The Cataract is set in a Serbian society amidst great change. The Yugoslav succession was concluding, the Kosovo crisis was developing, and NATO was about to bomb Serbia. The novel is written through the perspective of a host of characters who, in some way or another, all represent some way in which Serbians are blind to crisis. However, Mićić Dimovska is not necessarily only interested in historical significance, she is most interested in the individual lives of Serbians in this time. The Cataract shows many people and explores their realities, giving the reader great insight into what life was really like for some people, and why, maybe, broader social behavior was the way it was. This is all displayed through individuals and their familial lives, their relationships with themselves, their friends, their government, etc. The characters in the novel fall into three main categories: members of the new-money class, members of political opposition, and normal "bystanders".

=== Poslednji zanosi MSS ===
This novel follows Milica Stojadinović Srpkinja and the effect that nationalism has on her literary career. A celebrated writer as a young woman, Stojadinović Srpkinja begins to reject her early work when nationalism makes it undesirable, preferring formal patriotic works. However, the patriarchal Serbian society does not accept her work. Her demise parallels the change in her writing and she ends up on the street. She dies a drunken beggar. This novel depicts the catastrophic product of a patriarchal society that suppresses cultural potential.

== Awards ==
Mićić-Dimovska's novels and short story collections received numerous awards:

- Poznanici: "Karolj Sirmaji" Prize (1981)
- Odmrzavanje: Andrić Prize (1991)
- Poslednji zanosi MSS: "Nolit" Prize (1996), "Branko Ćopić” Prize (1996), "Borislav Stanković” Prize (1997)
- U procepu: "Društvo književnika Vojvodine" Prize (1999)
