= List of Serbian writers =

This is a list of Serbian writers and poets from Serbia, Bosnia-Herzegovina, Montenegro, and former Yugoslav republic Macedonia and diaspore.

== A ==
- Ivo Andrić
- Draginja Adamović
- Ratko Adamović
- Kosta Abrašević
- Ratko Adamović
- Mira Adanja Polak
- Jasmina Ahmetagić
- Dejan Ajdačić
- Mirko Aksentijević
- David Albahari
- Mira Alečković
- Princess Anka Obrenović
- Dragutin Anastasijević
- Mika Antić
- Slobodan Antonić
- Voja Antonić
- Ljiljana Aranđelović
- Ksenija Atanasijević
- Sonja Atanasijević
- Nataša Atanasković
- Smilja Avramov
- Dimitrije Avramović
- Predrag Azdejković
- Voja Antonić
- Vladimir Arsenijević
- Bogoboj Atanacković
- Platon Atanacković
- Jovan Avakumović

== B ==
- Sava Babić
- Dragan Babić
- Vladislav Bajac
- Đorđe Bajić (novelist)
- Ljiljana Bakić
- Ilija Bakić
- Lujo Bakotić
- Jelena Balšić Hranić
- Danica Bandić
- Anabela Basalo
- Đorđe Balašević
- Matija Ban
- Svetislav Basara
- Dušan Bataković
- Radomir Belaćević
- Aleksandar Belić
- Aleksandar Bećić
- Matija Bećković
- Milan Belegišanin
- Isidora Bjelica
- Mirjana Bjelogrlić-Nikolov
- Marina Blagojević
- Sava Bjelanović
- Isidora Bjelica
- Mirjana Bobić-Mojsilović
- Lazar Bogdanović
- Zoran Bognar
- Marina Bojić
- Milutin Bojić
- Veljko Bojić
- Bogdan Bogdanović
- Milan Bogdanović
- Valtazar Bogišić
- Dragoslav Bokan
- Radojica Bošković
- Đorđe Branković (count)
- Dragomir Brajković
- Scribe Bratko
- Dragomir Brzak
- Timothy John Byford
- Dragomir Brajković
- Đorđe Branković
- Radoslav Bratić
- Vladimir Bulatović Vib
- Miodrag Bulatović
- Marina Blagojević
- Vanja Bulić
- Irinej Bulović
- Milica Bodrožić
- Zoran Božović

== C ==
- Elizabeth Christitch
- Annie Christitch
- Grigorije Camblak
- Branislav Crnčević
- Branislav Crnčević
- Miloš Crnjanski
- Dejan Crnomarković

== Č ==
- Melko Čingrija
- Prokopije Čokorilo
- Aleksandar Čotrić

== Ć ==
- Ivo Ćipiko
- Zoran Ćirić
- Jovan Ćirilov
- Zoran Ćirić
- Dejan Ćirjaković
- Olivera Ćirković
- Dragan Ćirjanić
- Branko Ćopić
- Svetozar Ćorović
- Bora Ćosić
- Branimir Ćosić
- Dobrica Ćosić
- Gordana Ćulibrk
- Slobodan Ćurčić
- Milan Ćurčin

== D ==
- Jelena Damjanović
- Ratomir Damjanović
- Svetozar Damjanović
- Božidarka Kika Damjanović-Marković
- Danilo II, Serbian Archbishop
- Danilo III
- Goran Daničić
- Danilo's anonymous pupil
- Milovan Danojlić
- Oskar Davičo (Surrealist)
- Filip David
- Ferenc Deák
- Milan Dedinac
- Dimitrije Dedinac (see Mladen Dimitrijević)
- Draga Dejanović
- Mihajlo Dejanović
- Jovan Delić
- Mirko Demić
- Jovan Deretić
- Vladan Desnica (Surrealist)
- Vojislav D. Dević (1952)
- Mladen Dimitrijević (Surrealist)
- Vojin Dimitrijević
- Zija Dizdarević
- Arsen Diklić
- Moma Dimić
- Mladen Dimitrijević, nom de plume of Dimitrije Dedinac
- Ratko Dmitrović
- Dragutin Dobričanin
- Vladan Dobrivojević
- Radoje Domanović
- Domentijan
- Jovan Došenović
- Slavka Drašković
- Rajna Dragićević
- Adam Dragosavljević
- Vuk Drašković
- Labud Dragić
- Predrag Dragić
- Rade Drainac
- Mladen Dražetin
- Jovan Dučić
- Dragojlo Dudić
- Todor Dutina
- Milan Dvornić
- Dragomir Dujmov

== Dž ==
- Petar Džadžić

== Đ or Dj ==
- Ivan Đaja
- Gordana Đilas
- Gojko Đogo
- Dejan Đorđević
- Jovan Đorđević
- Bora Đorđević
- Branivoj Đorđević
- Jelena Đurović
- Bora Đorđević
- Časlav Đorđević
- Mirko Đorđević
- Aleksa Đukanović
- Momčilo Đujić
- Antonije Đurić
- Ivan Đurić
- Jelena Đurović

== E ==
- Dobrica Erić

== F ==
- Helen Losanitch Frothingham
- Oskar Freysinger
- Vukašin Filipović

== G ==
- Vladimir Gaćinović
- Ilija Garašanin
- Milovan Glišić
- Ivan Glišić
- Goran Gocić
- Vesna Goldsworthy
- Jovan Grčić Milenko
- Slavomir Gvozdenovici
- Zorka Grandov
- Milan Grol
- Elder Grigorije
- Nikanor Grujić
- Frano Getaldić-Gundulić
- R. M. Guéra

== H ==
- Ljiljana Habjanović Đurović
- Ivana Hadži-Popović
- Dragan Hajduković
- Maja Herman Sekulić
- Olga Humo
- Jasmina Holbus
- Oto Horvat

== I ==
- Violeta Ivković
- Ljubica Ivošević Dimitrov
- Jakov Ignjatović
- Branislava Ilić
- Dragutin Ilić
- Jovan Ilić
- Saša Ilić
- Vojislav Ilić
- Vojislav Ilić Mlađi
- Antonije Isaković
- Ivan Ivanić
- Ivan Ivanji
- Pavle Ivić

== J ==
- Оliver Janković
- Jefrem Janković Tetovac
- Branislav Janković
- Milorad Janković
- Zorica Jevremović
- Marica Josimčević
- Stevan Jakovljević
- Đura Jakšić
- Mileta Jakšić
- Zoran Jakšić
- Jefimija
- Jefrem
- Milica Jeftimijević-Lilić
- Milosav Jelić
- Vojin Jelić
- Zorica Jevremović
- Darinka Jevrić
- Atanasije Jevtić
- Dragoljub Jeronić
- Vladeta Jerotić
- Dobroslav Jevđević
- Miroslav Josić-Višnjić
- Biljana Jovanović
- Đorđe Jovanović (Surrealist)
- Lazar Jovanović
- Ljubiša Jovanović
- ljubomir Jovanović
- Rade Jovanović (singer)
- Vladimir Jovanović
- Vojislav V. Jovanović
- Ranko Jovovć
- Proka Jovkić
- Aleksandar Jugović
- Jelena Dimitrijević
- Dragan Jeremić
- Vladeta Jerotić
- Miroslav Josić Višnjić
- Jovan Vujošević
- Slobodan Jovanović
- Vojislav Jovanović
- Boško Jovičić

== K ==
- Dragoš Kalajić
- Nataša Kandić
- Mina Karadžić
- Olivera Katarina
- Irena Kazazić
- Mihajlo Kažić
- Tamara Kučan
- Dragoš Kalajić
- Momo Kapor
- Avdo Karabegović Hasanbegov
- Avdo Karabegović
- Srđan Karanović
- Vojislav Karanović
- Miroslav Karaulac
- Radovan Karadžić
- Vuk Karadžić
- Milan Kašanin
- Nikola Kašiković
- Stoja Kašiković
- Dejan Katalina
- Vladimir Kecmanović
- Drago Kekanović
- Danilo Kiš
- Ivan Klajn
- Petar Kočić
- Milan Komnenić
- Đorđe Kostić (Surrealist)
- Laza Kostić
- Slobodan Kostić
- Zlatko Krasni
- Zdravko Krstanović
- Miodrag Kojadinović
- Nikola Koljević
- Lazar Komarčić
- Konstantin Filozof
- Radomir Konstantinović
- Dušan Kostić
- Đorđe Kostić
- Erih Koš
- Božidar Kovaček
- Ivan Kovačević (antropolog)
- Gordana Kuić
- Slobodan Kušić
- Milan Kujundžić Aberdar

== L ==
- Vladana Likar-Smiljanić
- Dragan Lakićević
- Ivan V. Lalić
- Mihailo Lalić
- Jelena Lazarević
- Laza Lazarević
- Stefan Lazarević
- Vladimir Lazović
- Paulina Lebl-Albala
- Jelena Lengold
- Vladana Likar-Smiljanić
- Đorđe Lobačev
- Jelena Lozanić (see Helen Losanitch Frothingham
- Tamara Lujak
- Dragan Lukić
- Svetlana Lukić
- Stevan M. Luković
- Svetlana Lukić

== Lj ==
- Draga Ljočić
- Stjepan Mitrov Ljubiša

== M ==
- Desanka Maksimović
- Smilja Marjanović-Dušanić
- Mihailo Marković
- Ana Marija Marović
- Savo Martinović
- Veselin Masleša
- Dušan Matić (Surrealist)
- Princess Milica of Serbia
- Milutin Milanković
- Ognjenka Milićević
- Miloš S. Milojević
- Nikola Milošević (politician)
- Branislav "Branko" Milovanović
- Nadežka Mosusova
- Zorica Mršević
- Mara Đorđević-Malagurski
- Djordje Maletić
- Todor Manojlović
- Đorđe Marković Koder
- Đorđe Magarašević
- Maga Magazinović
- Georgije Magarašević
- Kosta Majkić
- Aleksandar Mandić
- Svetislav Mandić
- Ilija Marinković
- Mladen Markov
- Pavle Marković Adamov
- Bogislav Marković
- Radovan Beli Marković
- Igor Marojević
- Simo Matavulj
- Dušan Matić
- Vladan Matijević
- Dejan Medaković
- Šiško Menčetić
- Ljubomir Micić
- Milica Mićić Dimovska
- Niko Mirošević-Sorgo
- Dragoslav Mihailović
- Mihajlo Mihajlov
- Borislav Mihajlović
- Jasmina Mihajlović
- Aleksa Mikić
- Milovan Miković
- Feliks Mileker
- Slobodan Mileusnić
- Milan Milićević
- Ognjenka Milićević
- Zlatoje Martinov
- Dušan Matić
- Vladan Matijević
- Milan Mitrović
- Borislav Mihajlović Mihiz
- Avram Miletić
- Milan Milišić
- Marko Miljanov
- Branko Miljković
- Branislav Milosavljević
- Branislav Branko Milovanović
- Sima Milutinović Sarajlija
- Čedomir Mirković
- Milorad Mitrović (poet)
- Srba Mitrović
- Milan Mladenović
- Milena Mrazović
- Sava Mrkalj
- Nikola Musulin
- Mir-Jam
- Čedomir Mirković
- Igor Mirović
- Dimitrije Mitrinović
- Mitra Mitrović
- Jordan Molović
- Salmon Monny de Boully
- Goran Mrakić
- Lukijan Mušicki
- Jelena Marinković (1878-1958), writer
- Jelena Milojković (1857-1942), writer
- Jelisaveta Marković (1868-1953), translator from French, Latin, Norwegian, and English

== N ==
- Momčilo Nastasijević
- Dejan Nebrigić
- Matija Nenadović
- Vesna Nešić Nedić
- Svetomir Nikolajević
- Jovan Nikolić (writer)
- Jovanka Nikolić
- Milica Ninković
- Anna Novakov
- Mirjana Novaković
- Stojan Novaković
- Aleksandar Novaković
- Duško Novaković
- Branislav Nušić

== O ==
- Dositej Obradović
- Téa Obreht
- Princess Anka Obrenović
- Dejan Ognjanović
- Vida Ognjenović
- Grozdana Olujić
- Tomo P. Oraovac
- Zaharije Orfelin
- Milan Orlić

== P ==
- Jovan Pačić
- Nebojša Pajkić
- Medo Pucić
- Niko Pucić
- Vice Pucić
- Maria Palaiologina, Queen of Serbia
- Milenko Pajić
- Joanikije Pamučina
- Sima Pandurović
- Vladislav Pandurović
- Mihajlo Pantić
- Žarana Papić
- Ratko Parežanin
- Milan Paroški
- Milorad Pavić
- Gordana Petković Laković
- Milivoje Pavlović
- Miodrag Pavlović
- Slaviša Pavlović
- Zoran Pavlović
- Živojin Pavlović
- Radoslav Pavlović (pisac)
- Srba Pavlović
- Borislav Pekić
- Vaso Pelagić
- Sava Penčić
- Ljubinka Perinac Stankov
- Sreten Perović
- Muharem Pervić
- Stevan Pešić
- Zoran Pešić Sigma
- Vesna Pešić
- Radoslav Petković
- Vladislav Petković Dis
- Nevenka Petrić
- Rajko Petrov Nogo
- Petar II Petrović-Njegoš
- Rastko Petrović
- Boško Petrović
- Goran Petrović
- Ilija M. Petrović
- Milorad Petrović Seljančica
- Uroš Petrović
- Veljko Petrović (poet)
- Zoran Petrović (writer)
- Vladimir Pištalo
- Mato Pižurica
- Tešan Podrugović
- Mira Adanja Polak
- Branko Ve Poljanski
- Vasko Popa
- Raša Popov
- Đorđe Popović-Daničar
- Jovan Sterija Popović
- Milan B. Popović
- Pavle Popović
- Bogdan Popović
- Petar Popović (Surrealist)
- Vasa Popović
- Zoran Popović
- Jovan Popović (writer)
- Koča Popović (Surrealist)
- Milan Popović (songwriter)
- Petar Popović
- Dalibor Popović Pop
- Danko Popović
- Konstantin Koča Popović
- Jaša Prodanović
- Bosiljka Pušić
- Radomir Putnik (pisac)
- Nevenka Petrić
- Dušan Prelević
- Jelena Popović (1845-1930), poet
- Jelica Petrović-Pomoriščeva (1875-1960), translator

== R ==
- Jovan Radivojević
- Dušan Radojčić
- Amfilohije Radović
- Dušan Radović
- Jovan Radulović
- Andrija Radulović
- Jovan Radulović
- Jerotej Račanin
- Čirjak Račanin
- Kiprijan Račanin
- Teodor Račanin
- Simeon Račanin
- Hristifor Račanin
- Prohor Račanin
- Stevan Raičković
- Jovan Rajić
- Velimir Rajić
- Vićentije Rakić
- Slobodan Rakitić
- Risto Ratković (Surrealist)
- Svetolik Ranković
- Eva Ras
- Old Rashko
- Risto Ratković
- Marko Ristić (Surrealist)
- Ljubivoje Ršumović
- Đorđe Rajković
- Milan Rakić
- Mita Rakić
- Jara Ribnikar
- Jovan Ristić
- Marko Ristić (Surrealist)

== S ==
- Baja Saitović-Lukin
- Dušan Salatić
- Miloslav Samardžić
- Adrijan Sarajlija
- Meša Selimović
- Jovan Skerlić
- Jovanka Skerlić
- Meša Selimović
- Dejan Tiago Stankovic
- Anica Savić Rebac
- Dubravka Sekulić
- Isidora Sekulić
- Staka Skenderova
- Sofija Skoric
- Ružica Sokić
- Svetlana Spajić
- Biljana Srbljanović
- Mirjana Stefanović
- Maša Stokić
- Baja Saitović-Lukin
- Charles Simic
- Jelena Đ. Simić (1850-1930), writer
- Ljubodrag Simonović
- Ljubomir Simović
- Ljiljana Smajlović
- Dobroslav Smiljanić
- Pavle Solarić
- Jelena Popović Spasić (1876-1968), writer
- Zoran Spasojević
- Jela Spiridonović-Savić
- Vladimir Stanimirović
- Stanoje Stanojević
- Dejan Stojanović
- Ivan Stojanović
- Radosav Stojanović
- Dejan Stojiljković
- Mara Stokić
- Olivia Sudjic
- Jovan Sundečić
- Gordana Suša
- Slavenko Saletović
- Saša Popović Pop
- Milisav Savić
- Novica Savić
- Martin Segon
- Slobodan Selenić
- Elder Siluan
- Ljubodrag Simonović
- Jovan Skerlić
- Goran Skrobonja
- Djoko Slijepčević
- Pero Slijepčević
- Dušan Spasojević (pisac)
- Zoran Spasojević
- Spiridon Gopčević
- Biljana Srbljanović
- Srđan Srdić
- Stojan Srdić
- Stevan Sremac
- Milica Stojadinović Srpkinja
- Slobodan Stanišić
- Milanka Stankić
- Borisav Stanković
- Goran Stanković (pisac)
- Mirjana Stefanović
- Zoran Stefanović
- Vidosav Stevanović
- Atanasije Stojković
- Dejan Stojanović
- Radosav Stojanović

== Š ==
- Slobodan Škerović
- Milorad Popović Šapčanin
- Vojislav Šešelj
- Branimir Šćepanović
- Miladin Ševarlić
- Petar Šarić
- Miladin Ševarlić (dramatist)

== T ==
- Novica Tadić
- Živojin Tamburić
- Jovan Tanasijević
- Darko Tanasković
- Ana Tasić
- Jasmina Tešanović
- Sava Tekelija
- Teodosije Hilandarac
- Mirko Tepavac
- Steve Tesich
- Milosav Tešić
- Srđan V. Tešin
- Zorica Tijanić
- Bogdan Tirnanić
- Dušan Duda Timotijević
- Aleksandar Tišma
- Dana Todorović
- Miroljub Todorović
- Pera Todorović
- Vojislav Todorović
- Dejan Tofčević
- Novica Tadić
- George Vid Tomashevich
- Nenad Trajković (poet)
- Duško Trifunović
- Miroslav Toholj
- Dragan Tomić (writer)
- Kosta Trifković
- Duško Trifunović

== U ==
- Ognjeslav Utješenović
- Pavle Ugrinov
- Milorad Ulemek
- Milutin Uskoković
- Dragan Uskoković

== V ==
- Srdjan Valjarević
- Dušan Vasiljev
- Sonja Veselinović
- Aleksije Vezilić
- Filip Višnjić
- Milovan Vitezović
- Mihailo Vitković
- Vladan Kuzmanović
- Dušan Vukajlović
- Dragiša Vasić
- Vitomir Vasić
- László Végel
- Vukša Veličković
- Dragan Velikić
- Nikolaj Velimirović
- Vladimir Velmar-Janković
- Svetlana Velmar Janković
- Gavrilo Stefanović Venclović
- Marko Vidojković
- Jovan Stefanović Vilovski
- Stanislav Vinaver
- Čedomir Višnjić
- Milovan Vitezović
- Nada Vilotijević
- Gene Luke Vlahovic
- Svetozar Vlajković
- Gordana Vlajić
- Ljiljana Maletin Vojvodić
- Nikola Vulić
- Duška Vrhovac
- Jelena Vučetić
- Lazar Vučković
- Aleksandar Vučo (Surrealist)
- Julijana Lula Vučo (Surrealist)
- Nikola Vučo (Surrealist)
- Prvoslav Vujcic
- Nikola Vujičić
- Stojan Vujičić
- Joakim Vujić
- Jovan Vukadinović (essayst)
- Miroslav Vuksanović
- Divna M. Vuksanović
- Jelena Vukičević
- Drenka Willen

== Z ==
- Gerasim Zelić
- Jovan Zivlak

== Ž ==
- Stevan Živanović
- Radojica Živanović Noe (Surrealist)
- Nina Živančević
- Nikola Živković
- Branimir Živojinović
- Vasa Živković
- Zoran Živković (writer)
- Massuka Živojinović
