= Vladan =

- Gender: male
- Language: Serbian

Origin
- Origin: Slavic
- Meaning: vlad ("to rule, ruler")

Other names
- Alternative spelling: Serbian Cyrillic: Владан
- Variant forms: Vladin, Vladun female form Vladana, Vladanka
- See also: Vlada, Vlado, Vlade, Vladko, Vladoje, Vladeta

Vladan (pronounced [ʋlǎːdan], Serbian Cyrillic: Владан) is a Serbian masculine given name, a shorter form of Slavic dithematic names with the element vlad meaning "to rule, ruler". It is attested in Serbian society since the Middle Ages. The patronymic surname Vladanović is derived from the name. Feminine forms are Vladana and Vladanka.

It may refer to:

- Vladan Alanović (born 1967), Croatian basketballer
- Vladan Batić (1949–2010), Serbian politician and statesman
- Vladan Desnica (1905–1967), Yugoslav writer
- Vladan Đogatović (born 1984), Serbian footballer
- Vladan Đorđević (1844–1930), Serbian politician and statesman
- Vladan Grujić (born 1981), Bosnian footballer
- Vladan Jurica15th-century Albanian nobleman
- Vladan Kostić Montenegrin footballer
- Vladan Kovačević (born 1998), Serbian footballer
- Vladan Kujović (born 1978), Serbian footballer
- Vladan Lukić (born 1970), Serbian footballer
- Vladan Marković, Serbian swimmer
- Vladan Matić (born 1970), Serbian handballer
- Vladan Milosavljević (born 1980), Serbian footballer
- Vladan Milovanović (born 1970), Serbian footballer
- Vladan Pavlović (born 1984), Serbian footballer
- Vladan Radača (born 1955), Serbian coach and former footballer
- Vladan Savić (born 1979), Montenegrin footballer
- Vladan Spasojević (born 1980), Serbian footballer
- Vladan Vasilijević, Yugoslav specialist in criminal law
- Vladan Vićević (born 1967), Yugoslavian-born Salvadoran football (soccer) player
- Vladan Vukosavljević (disambiguation), several people
- Vladan Živković (1941–2022), Serbian actor

== See also ==
- Slavic names
