= Vlada =

Vladislava
- Gender: female

Origin
- Origin: Slavic

Other names
- Alternative spelling: Cyrillic: Влада
- Variant forms: Vladik, Vladirik
- See also: Vladana, Vladine, Vladun, Vladeta, Vladislava, Vladimire

Vlada is a Slavic given name, derived from the word vlada meaning "rule". It is a masculine name in Serbia and feminine name in Romania, Ukraine, Belarus, Moldova, Bulgaria and Russia. It may refer to:

- Vlada Avramov (born 1979), Serbian footballer
- Vlada Divljan (born 1958), Serbian singer
- Vlada Ekshibarova; now Vlada Katic (born 1989), Israeli-Uzbekistani tennis player
- Vlada Jovanović (born 1973), Serbian basketball coach and former player
- Vlada Kubassova (born 1995), Estonian footballer
- Vlada Nikolchenko (born 2002), Ukrainian individual rhythmic gymnast
- Vlada Stošić (born 1965), Serbian footballer
- Vlada Roslyakova (born 1987), Russian model
- Vlada, Belarusian pop singer

== See also ==
- Vladas, given name
- Vlade, given name
