= Vladeta =

- Gender: male

Origin
- Origin: Slavic
- Meaning: vlad ("to rule, ruler")

Other names
- Related names: Vladan, Vladoje, Vladin, Vladko

Vladeta (Serbian Cyrillic: Владета) is a Serbian masculine given name, derived from the Slavic element vlad meaning "to rule, ruler" and the suffix -eta. It is attested in Serbian society since the Middle Ages. The patronymic surname Vladetić (Владетић) is derived from the name. It may refer to:

- Vladeta Janković (born 1940), Serbian philologist and politician
- Vladeta Jerotić (born 1924), Serbian psychiatrist and Jungian psychologist
- Vladeta Kandić "Bata Kanda" (born 1938), Serbian musician
- Vladeta Đurić (1905–1976), Yugoslav footballer, SK Jugoslavija
- Vladeta Milićević (1898–1969), Yugoslav intelligence agent, Interpol representative, and diplomat
- Vladeta Popović Pinecki (1911–1941), Yugoslav Spanish fighter
- Vladeta Vlahović (born 1940), Serbian folklorist
- Vladeta Vuković (1928–2003), Serbian poet

== See also ==
- Slavic names

== Sources ==
- Grković, Milica (1977). Rečnik ličnih imena kod Srba. Belgrade: Vuk Karadžić.
