= Vladoje =

- Gender: male

Origin
- Origin: Slavic
- Meaning: vlad ("to rule, ruler")

Other names
- Related names: Vladan, Vladeta, Vladin, Vladko

Vladoje (Serbian Cyrillic: Владоје) is a Serbo-Croatian masculine given name, derived from the Slavic element vlad meaning "to rule, ruler" and the suffix -oje. It is attested in Serbian society since the Middle Ages. The patronymic surname Vladojević (Владојевић) is derived from the name. It may refer to:

- Vladoje (tepčija) (fl. 1326), Serbian nobleman
- Vladoje Aksmanović "Viktor Axmann" (1878–1946), Croatian architect
- Vladoje Dukat (1861–1944), Croatian academic

== See also ==
- Vladojevići, village in Bosnia
- Mladen Vladojević, Serbian magnate
- Slavic names

== Sources ==
- Grković, Milica (1977). Rečnik ličnih imena kod Srba. Belgrade: Vuk Karadžić.
