= Vlajković =

Vlajković (Serbian: Влајковић) is a Serbian surname. It may refer to:

- Svetozar Vlajković, Serbian writer
- Radovan Vlajković, Yugoslav politician
- Sava Vlajković, Serbian politician
- Slavoljub Vlajković, Yugoslav politician

== See also ==
- Vlatković (disambiguation)
