= Boško Petrović (writer) =

Serbian writer

- Бошко Петровић
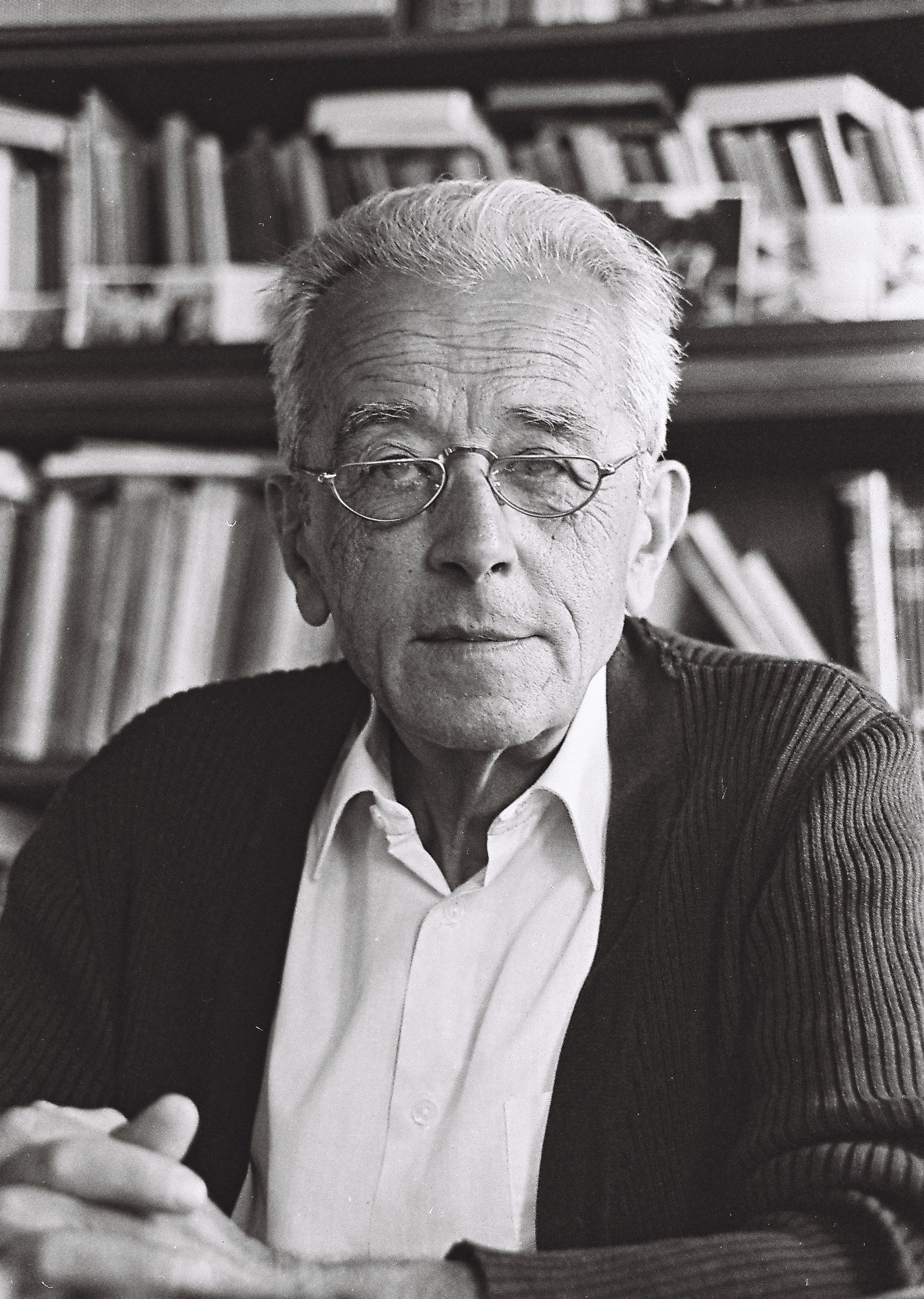
- Petrović photographed by Branko Lučić
- Born: 7 January 1915; Nagyvárad, Kingdom of Hungary, Austria-Hungary
- Died: 30 June 2001 (aged 86); Novi Sad, Serbia, FR Yugoslavia

Boško Petrović (Serbian Cyrillic: Бошко Петровић; 7 January 1915 – 30 June 2001) was a Serbian novelist and poet. He was also secretary and president of Matica Srpska.

== Biography ==
Boško Petrović was born on 7 January 1915 in Oradea Mare (Veliki Varadin), grew up in Morović, and was educated in Novi Sad and Belgrade. During World War II, he was captured and taken to a German POW camp, and after the war, he settled in Novi Sad. He worked in the publishing company Budućnost, then in the publishing company Matica Srpska, for a while as a director and then as an editor-in-chief, until his retirement in 1981. He was a member of the editorial board of the "Chronicle" of Matica Srpska (1953-1964), editor of the "Chronicle" of Matica Srpska (1965-1969), secretary of Matica Srpska (1969-1979), president of Matica Srpska (since 1991) and longtime member of the Board of the Serbian Literary Association. He was elected a corresponding member of the Serbian Academy of Sciences and Arts on 21 March 1974, and a full member on 7 May 1981. He died in Novi Sad on 30 June 2001.

== Literary career ==
Boško Petrović started his literary work in high school when he published his first poems. In addition to poems, he wrote short stories ("Earth and Sea", 1950; "Slightly Promising Clouds", 1955; "Sep", 1960; "Conversation on Secrets", 1974), novels ("Diary of a German Soldier", 1962; "Arrival at the End of Summer," 1970; "Singer I and II", 1979), essays on literature and art (Dan među slikama, 1973). He was also known as a theatre critic and a well-known translator from German into Serbian, especially the works of Thomas Mann, Erich M. Remarque, Rainer Rilke, Bertolt Brecht.

== See also ==
- List of Serbian writers
