= Vladas =

Vladas is a Lithuanian given name. Notable people with the name include:

- Vladas Česiūnas
- Vladas Drėma
- Vladas Mikėnas
- Vladas Mironas
- Vladas Petronaitis
- Vladas Tučkus
- Vladas Zajanckauskas
- Vladas Žulkus

== See also ==
- Vlada
