= Vladana =

- Gender: Female

Origin
- Origin: Slavic

Other names
- Alternative spelling: Cyrillic: Владана
- Nicknames: Vlada, Vladka, Dana
- See also: Vladanka

Vladana (Cyrillic: Владана is female given name. It is Slavic name. It is a feminine form of the name Vladan. Pronounced "vlah-dah-nah".

== Name Days ==
Czech: 30 August Slovak: 16 October

== Famous bearers ==
- Vladana Vučinić, a Montenegrin singer
- Vladana Likar-Smiljanić, an illustrator of children’s books
