= Vlade =

Vlade (Serbian: Владе) is a given name. Notable people with this name include:

- Vlade Divac (born 1968), Serbian basketball player and executive
- Vlade Đurović (born 1948), Serbian basketball coach
- Vlade Janakievski (born 1957), American football player
- Vladeta Jerotić (1924–2018), Serbian psychiatrist, psychotherapist, philosopher and writer
- Vlade Lazarevski (born 1983), Macedonian footballer

== See also ==
- Vlada, given name
