= Draginja Adamović =

Serbian poet

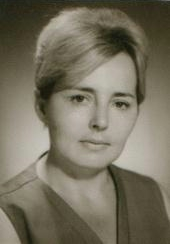
Draginja Adamović

Draginja Adamović (Serbian Cyrillic: Драгиња Адамовић; 1925–2000) was a Serbian poet.

She published three poetry books and was included in three anthologies of poems: "Poetesses of Kragujevac" (1991), "Lyrical humming of Sumadija" (2004), and "Singers of sleeping capital" (2006, 2007).

She published poems and stories in literary magazines, daily and weekly newspapers. The books "The Earth a grove to the sky" and "At the time absent" got annual rewards from The Cultural-Educational Association of Kragujevac Municipality.

She lived and worked in Kragujevac, and her son is the writer Zoran Spasojević.

== Published books ==
- „The Earth a grove to the sky“ (poetry, Kragujevac, 1977)
- „At the end of silence“ (poetry, Kragujevac, 1979)
- „At the time absent“ (poetry, Kragujevac, 1987)
