= Vlatka =

- Gender: female
- Language: Serbo-Croatian

Origin
- Origin: South Slavic
- Region of origin: Southeastern Europe

Other names
- Alternative spelling: Serbian Cyrillic: Влатка
- Variant form: Vladka (Владка)
- Related names: male form Vlatko

Vlatka (Serbian Cyrillic: Влатка) is a feminine given name of South Slavic origin. It may refer to:

- Vlatka Pokos, Croatian pop singer and former TV host
- Vlatka Oršanić, Slovene soprano singer
