= Gordana Petković Laković =

Serbian writer

- Гордана Петковић Лаковић
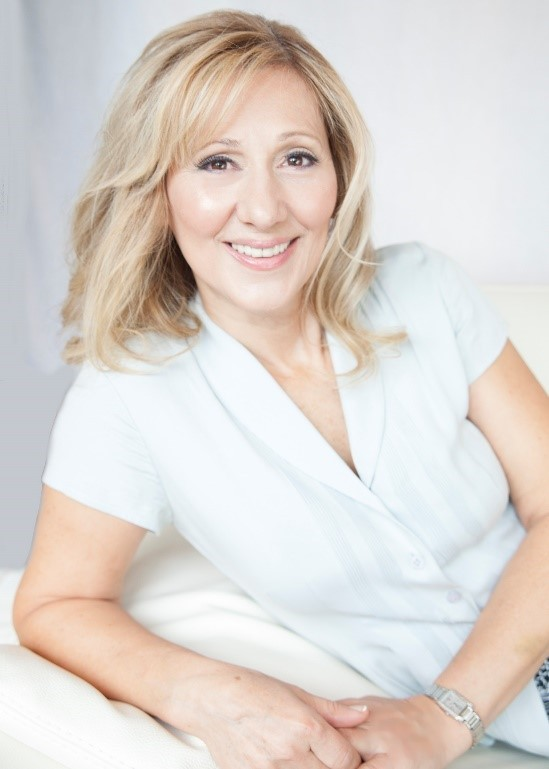
- Born: February 21, 1960 (age 66); Belgrade, FPR Yugoslavia
- Website: gordanalakovic.com

Gordana Petković Laković (Serbian: Гордана Петковић Лаковић; born February 21, 1960) is a Serbian writer from Toronto.

== Career ==
Gordana Petković Laković spent her childhood and youth in Belgrade, and in 1994 she moved with her family to Toronto. By 2023, she had published thirteen books of prose and poetry for adults and children. Her literary evenings were held in Belgrade and throughout Serbia, Republika Srpska, Croatia, Romania, Hungary, Canada, and the United States. Her play Forest Tangle (Serbian: Šumska zavrzlama) has been in the repertoire of Belgrade's Akademija 28 theatre since 2022. She founded the Caravan of Happiness literary workshop for children.

Additionally, she is engaged in journalism, amateur theater acting, and community management. In that capacity, she was one of the initiators of a campaign of renaming the upper part of Burlington Street in Hamilton, Ontario to Nikola Tesla Boulevard.

The Matica iseljenika i Srba u regionu gave her the Rastko Petrović Award for 2018, and the Cultural and Educational Community of Serbia awarded her the Golden Badge in 2019. She also received a Certificate of Appreciation from Tom Rakocevic, Member of Parliament for Humber River—Black Creek in 2021.

She is a member of the Association of Writers of Serbia, the Association of Writers of Republika Srpska, the Association of Playwrights of Serbia, the Serbian-Canadian Association of Writers "Desanka Maksimović," the Canadian Authors Association, the Matica Srpska, etc.

Gordana Petković Laković is included in the Biographical Lexicon of Serbian Writers in Diaspora 1914–2014, edited by Milena Milanović.

== Bibliography ==
=== Books for adults ===
- Kolona (Studio Znak, 2015)
- To nisam ja (Studio Znak, 2015)
- Dance of Life (author's edition, 2017)
- Zašto smo otišli (Ultimatum.rs, 2017) – as editor
- Kanadski bluz (Arte, 2019)
- Zašto smo otišli 2 – Na raskrsnici (Svet knjige, 2020) – as editor
- Zašto smo otišli 3 – Srcem u otadžbini (Čigoja štampa, 2021) – as editor

=== Books for children ===
- Neka raste naše drvo (Arte, 2019)
- Radoznalica (Arte, 2019)
- Šumska zavrzlama (Čigoja štampa and the Institute for Children's Literature, 2022)
- Dečje carstvo (Čigoja štampa and the Institute for Children's Literature, 2022)
- Little Wanna Know-It-All! (Institute for Children's Literature, 2022)
- Puteljak Veseljak (Institute for Children's Literature, 2022)
