= Vlatković =

Vlatković is derived from the South Slavic male given name "Vlatko". It may refer to:

- Uglješa Vlatković (c. 1359—after 1427), Serbian nobleman
- Ivan Vlatković (died 1612), better known as Ivo Senjanin, Croatian outlaw
- Radovan Vlatković (born 1962), Croatian horn player
- Vlatković noble family, served the Kingdom of Bosnia in Zahumlje
- Paskačić noble family, also known as Vlatković, served the Serbian Empire
