= Zorka Grandov =

Serbian economist (1947–2021)

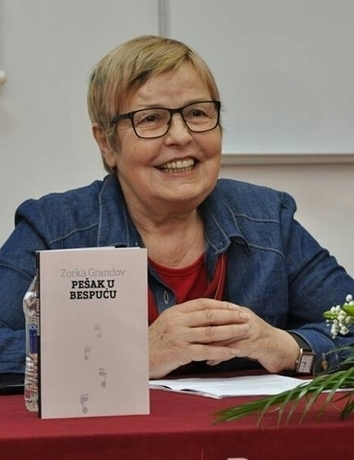
- Grandov presenting her book, 2016
- Born: 6 March 1947; Grdanovci, Socialist Federal Republic of Yugoslavia
- Died: 18 September 2021 (aged 74); Barcelona, Spain

Academic work
- Discipline: International economics, business economics, economic globalization and international business

Zorka Grandov (6 March 1947 – 18 September 2021) was a Serbian doctor of economics, professor emeritus and writer.

== Education ==
She graduated in economics from the University of Belgrade Faculty of Economics in 1969 and went on to get a magister degree. She finished her PhD studies in 1987 at the Faculty of Economics in Subotica, which belongs to the University of Novi Sad.

== Career ==
Grandov started her career in economy in 1970. She started working for the Serbian Chamber of Commerce and in the Ministry of economy in Socialist Federal Republic of Yugoslavia in 1986.

She soon started her teaching career, teaching at universities in Serbia, Bosnia and Herzegovina and Spain. While working as a professor, she has mentored a couple of dozen masters, magisters and doctors theses and has been a member of the Scientific Society of Economists of Serbia since 2002.

Grandov has participated in and organised many research programs. While working as a professor, she had participated in many exchange programs and took part in many conferences abroad. She went to Santiago and Seoul in 1997 and Singapore in 2001.

She became the editor-in-chief of the economy magazine EMC Review in 2011 and still held that position. She was also the president of the program board of the international scientific conference Economic development and Standard of living EDASOL, which takes place every year in Banja Luka.

She was the president of the program board at the scientific conference Power of Communication POWERCOMM, which was held in Belgrade in 2012.

Zorka worked as the manager in accreditation of many universities and study programs, including Union University.

== Writing ==
Zorka Grandov has published over a hundred important articles in the fields of international and business economics in national and international scientific papers. She also wrote a number of books in economic globalization, international business and trade.

Grandov also published an autobiography, A traveler without a path (Serbian: Пешак у беспућу; Pešak u bespuću).

=== Books ===
- Grandov, Z.: Jugoslovenska trgovina u tržišnoj privredi, IPC-JU, Beograd, 1990.
- Grandov, Z.: Spoljnotrgovinsko poslovanje, prvo izdanje, Trgovačko društvo BTO, Beograd, 1997. ID 58244364
- Grandov, Z.: Trgovinsko poslovanje, Trgovačko društvo BTO, Beograd, 2000., ID 88487948
- Grandov, Z.: Pregovaranje u međunarodnom biznisu, Trgovačko društvo BTO, Beograd. Zorka Grandov
- Grandov, Z.: Spoljnotrgovinsko poslovanje u globalnom okruženju, Trgovačko društvo BTO, Beograd.Zorka Grandov
- Grandov, Z.: Međunarodni biznis i trgovina, Trgovačko društvo BTO, Beograd. Zorka Grandov
- Grandov, Z.: Međunarodna ekonomija i globalizacija, Trgovačko društvo BTO, Beograd. Zorka Grandov
- Grandov, Z. Đokić, M.: Strategije planiranja i budžetiranje, Trgovačko društvo BTO, Beograd, (Naučna knjiga). Zorka Grandov
- Grandov, Z. Đokić, M., Laketa, M: Planiranje i budžetiranje, Trgovačko društvo BTO, Beograd, (Naučna knjiga). Zorka Grandov
- Grandov, Z. Đokić, M.: Trgovinski marketing menadžment, Trgovačko društvo BTO, Beograd, (Naučna knjiga). Zorka Grandov
- Grandov Z., Đokić M.: Trgovinski marketing menadžment, Panevropski univerzitet Apeiron, Banja Luka. Zorka Grandov
- Grandov Z., Đokić M.: Međunarodni biznis i trgovina, Panevropski univerzitet Apeiron, Banja Luka. Zorka Grandov

=== Articles ===
- Grandov, Z., Vidas-Bubanja, M.: Ekonomski odnosi u regionu, u svetlu povećanja izvoza, Ekonomski anali, tematski broj/10/2002., Beograd
- Grandov, Z., Vidas-Bubanja, M.: Tranzicija tržišnih institucija – dve godine posle, Ekonomski anali, tematski broj/01/2003., Beograd
- Grandov, Z.: Carinski sistem i stope kao podsticaj spoljnotrgovinskoj razmeni, Ekonomski anali, tematski broj/09/2003., Beograd
- Grandov, Z.: Spoljnotrgovinski deficit i process stabilizacije i pridruživanja SCG Evropskoj Uniji, Ekonomski anali, tematski broj/09/2004., Beograd
- Grandov, Z.: Trgovinska politika i process stabilizacije i pridruživanja EU, Ekonomski anali, tematski broj/04/2005., Beograd
- Grandov, Z.: Ekonomska kretanja u Beogradu indikacija za Srbiju, Ekonomski anali, tematski broj/12/2003., Beograd
- Grandov, Z., Đokić, M.:Značaj investicionog okruženja za plasman sranih direktnih investicija", Pravo-teorija i praksa, 7-8/ 2010, Novi Sad. . str. 23–38 UDK 339.727.22(4) BIBLID:0352-3713(2010);26;(7–8): 23–37
- Grandov, Z., Đokić, M.: Oglašavanje i zaštita potrošača, Pravo-teorija i praksa, 11-12/ 2009, Novi Sad. . str. 67- 79, UDK 336.5 BIBLID:0352-3713(2009);26;(11–12):67-79
- Grandov, Z., Ogrizović, Ž., Đokić, M.: Small and medium enterprises management, Zbornik radova, FIMEK, 2. str. 36–41., ISSN 1820-9165, UDK 65.017.2/.32
- Grandov Z., Jovanović R.: Zaštita potrošača – komparativna analiza srbije i susednih zemalja, Časopis za ekonomiju i tržišne komunikacije EMC Review, Banja Luka, 2011. UDK:33, ISSN 2232-8823. str. 9–27
- Grandov Z., Stankov B., Đokić M.: Primena statističke metode linearanog trenda na izračunavanje vrednosti ulaznih tokova SDI u Srbiji i Hrvatskoj, Časopis za ekonomiju i tržišne komunikacije EMC Review, Godina III, broj II, (2013). str. 164–178
- Grandov Z., Stankov, B., Roganović M.: Uporedna analiza faktora koji podstiču inostrane investitore na direktna ulaganja u Srbiji i Rumuniji, Visoka poslovna škola Novi Sad, Škola biznisa, naučno-stručni časopis, 2014. ISSN 1451-6551. str. 141–169
- Grandov Z., Stankov B., Đokić M.: Istraživanje zadovoljstva potrošača uslugama Delhaize grupe u Srbiji, EMC Review, Godina V, broj II, 2015. ISSN 2232-8823. str. 168–193

== Sources ==
- Zorka Grandov. A traveler without a path. 2016. ISBN 978-86-916671-1-5.
