= Marina Blagojević =

Serbian sociologist (1958–2020)

Marina Blagojević (also, Marina Šijaković-Blagojević and Marina Blagojević Hughson; 1958 — 6 June 2020) was a Serbian sociologist, gender scholar, gender expert, and feminist.

== Biography ==
Blagojević received her education at the University of Belgrade (Bachelors, 1982; Masters, 1989; Ph.D. 1990). In 1990, along with Vesna Gojkovic, Maja Korac, Andjelka Milic, Zarana Papic, and Lina Vuskovic, Blagojević founded Zenska Stranka (ZEST; "Women's Party"), a women's political party. In 1991, along with other members of the feminist activist group "Women and Society", Blagojević co-founded and served on the first board of the Women's Study Center in Belgrade, Yugoslavia. From 1994 through 1998, she was the initiator and organizer of the first feminist conference in Post-communist Countries (organized by Women's Study Center, Belgrade); in 1998, she was the initiator and organizer of the first NGO Forum in Serbia (organized by Democratic Center Foundation).

A past-president of the Sociological Association of Serbia, she was a scientific counselor at the Institute for Criminological and Sociological Research in Belgrade, as well as a director at Altera MB Research Center on Gender and Ethnicity in Budapest, Hungary. Blagoǰević has taught at Sarajevo University and Central European University, and in 2014, she was a visiting professor at the University of Graz. Her work as an international gender expert has been across various organizations, such as the European Commission, European Parliament, United Nations Development Programme, UN Women, Sida, and the International Fund for Agricultural Development. She has published more than 100 academic and 20 expert publications.

She was married to John Hughson, Professor of Sport and Cultural Studies and Director of the International Football Institute at the University of Central Lancashire, UK.

== Selected works ==
- 2009, Knowledge production at the semiperiphery : a gender perspective
