= Stevan M. Luković =

Serbian poet (1877–1902)

Stevan M. Luković (1877 – 1902) was a Serbian lyric poet.

== Biography ==
Stevan M. Luković was born in Belgrade in 1877 and died in 1902 in the same city. His friends immediately collected all his poems and published them in 1903 in a volume entitled "Pesme Stevana M. Lukovića" (Poems of Stevan M. Luković) to the delight of readers. Luković was a master of lyric poetry, in which he achieved a perfect balance of feeling and expression, of form and content. Jovan Skerlić, a close friend of Luković, wrote, "His eligaic and lyrical style is very musical and in some poems have reached a high musical effect." Lukovic's lyrics have been extensively set to music by the great masters of the Serbian art-song. Luković, Velimir Rajić, Vojislav Ilić and Danica Marković shared the same melancholy tone in their poetry, enough for Skerlić to give them the moniker -- "the melancholic quartet".

The poetry of Luković is that of a young man; his poetry was written before he was twenty-five, and though he died at that age, he had, poetically, achieved what could be expected of a man whose life was cut short. The result is a poetry of enthusiasm; he is rarely half-hearted; when he is angry, he is furious, when he is pleased, joyful, and when he is unhappy, he is thoroughly dejected. Luković's poetry is personal, the most expansive, and in his poetry his subject is always, directly, himself, and he is quite frank about it.

Luković read the French contemporary poets and was strongly influenced by the Symbolists such as Alfred de Musset and Paul Verlaine; he made some translations from French; he was soon introduced to the circle gathered in the house of Jovan Ilić, and with these friends began to make a close study of Parnassians and especially impressed by the correctness of their form.

Stevan M. Luković was among the many writers and poets to have died as their careers began to peak, only to fall victims of consumption.

== Sources ==
- Skerlić, Jovan (1921). Istorija srpske književnosti. Beograd.
