= Zoran Petrović (writer) =

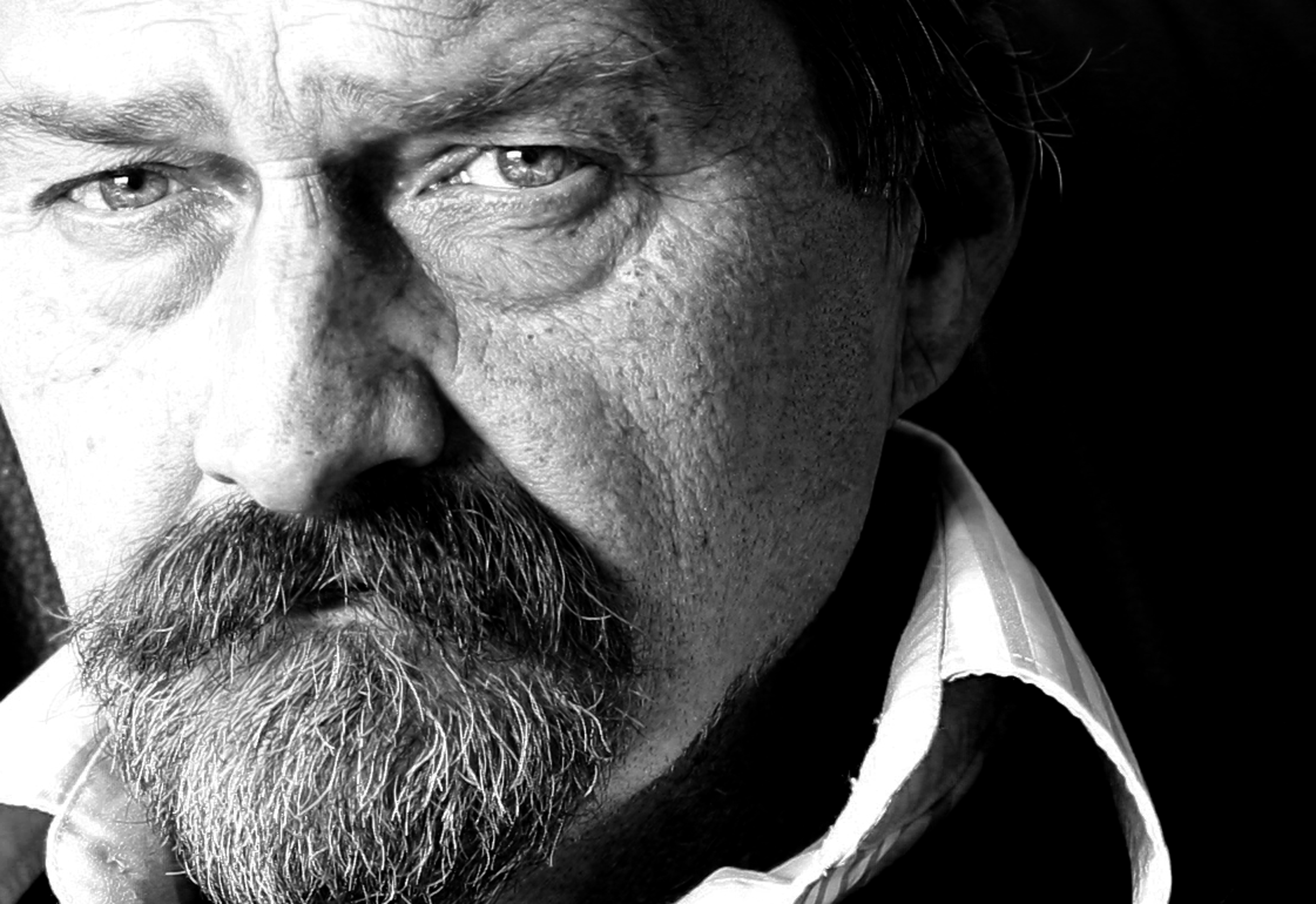
- Born: 5 March 1954; Kragujevac, FPR Yugoslavia
- Died: 25 February 2018 (aged 63); Kragujevac, Serbia
- Occupations: Writer and publicist

Zoran Petrović (Serbian Cyrillic: Зоран Петровић; 5 March 1954 – 25 February 2018) was a Serbian poet, novelist, and screenwriter.

He published a couple of poetry books, children books, novels, and two books as a publicist. He was the managing director of the oldest theater in Serbia Joakim Vujić.

In the years prior to his death, he worked as an editor for the publishing sector of the museum 21 October and as the chief editor for culture in local weekly newspaper Svetlost. He was also a columnist of Serbian newspaper Blic.

== Works ==
=== Poetry ===
- Pan i ogledalo, (1978)
- Aleksandrijska kritična masa, (1989)
- Svakodnevna molitva, (1995)
- Apsolutna nula, (1996)
- Spasiti spasioca, (1998)
- Prisutni su odsutni, (2002)
- Stav u trostavu, (2009)
- Uputstva za korišćenje besmislica (u štampi)
- Popis nestalih stvari (u štampi)
- Običnim rečima rečeno (u pripremi)

=== Children poetry books ===
- Priča o slovima, (1978)
- Pesme iz trbuha, (1983)

=== Theater Screenplays ===
- Muvoserine

==== Screenplay for children theater ====
- Magareća koža

=== Short story – books ===
- Raspadanje dekadnog sistema, (2010)

=== Opinion journalism ===
- Tajni dosije Josip Broz (Neobjavljeni arhivi Barskog kongresa)
- Vreme laži (knjiga razgovora sa Dankom Popovićem)

=== Novels ===
- Kamen blizanac, (2010)
- Poslednja narudžbina, (2010)
- Ugarak, (2011)

== Awards ==
- Miloš Crnjanski, 2011,
