= Jasmina Holbus =

Serbian interior designer and poet

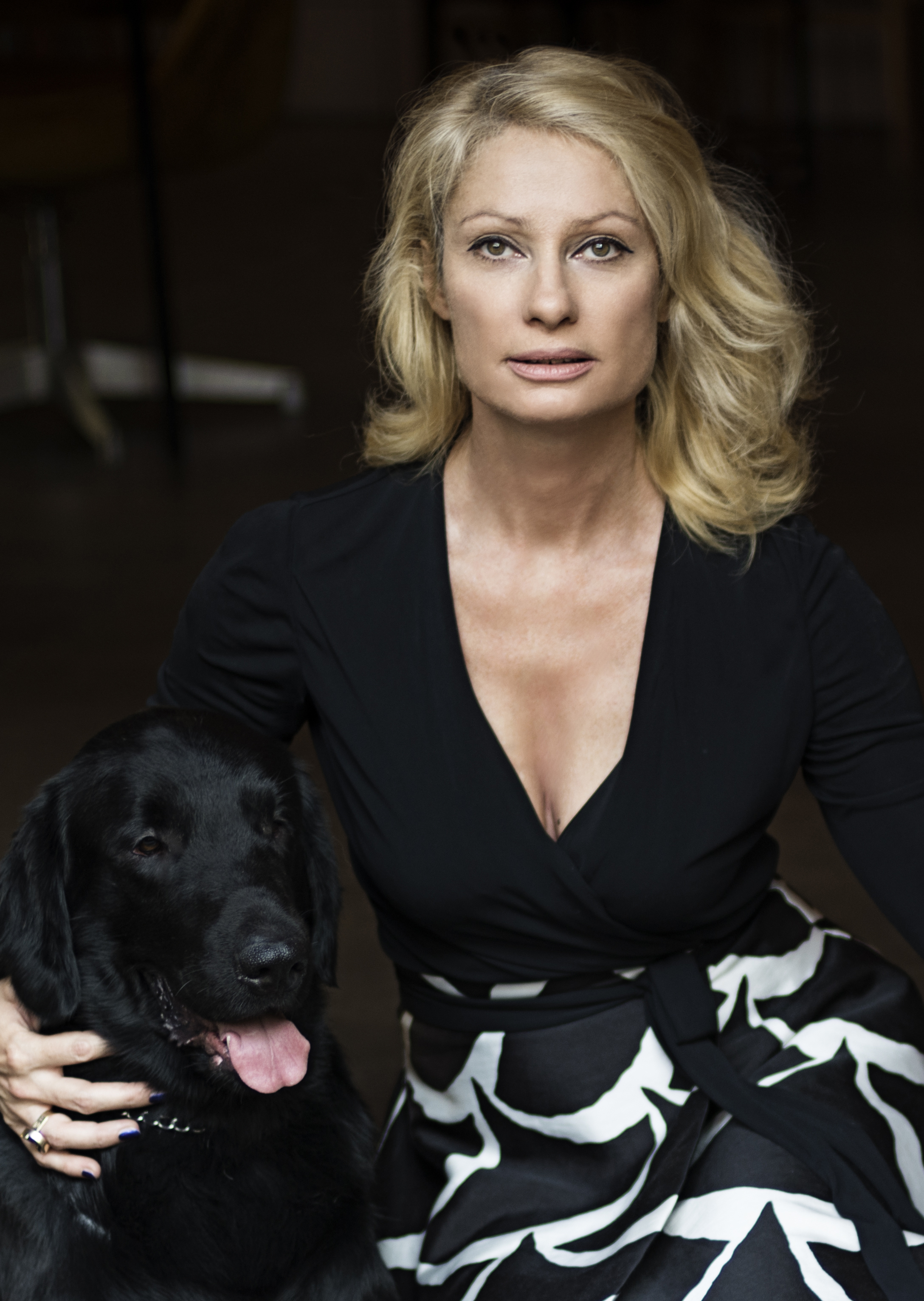
- Born: 21 November 1968 (age 57); Belgrade, PR Serbia, FPR Yugoslavia
- Occupations: Poet, designer
- Writing career
- Period: 1990–
- Genres: Poetry, stage design

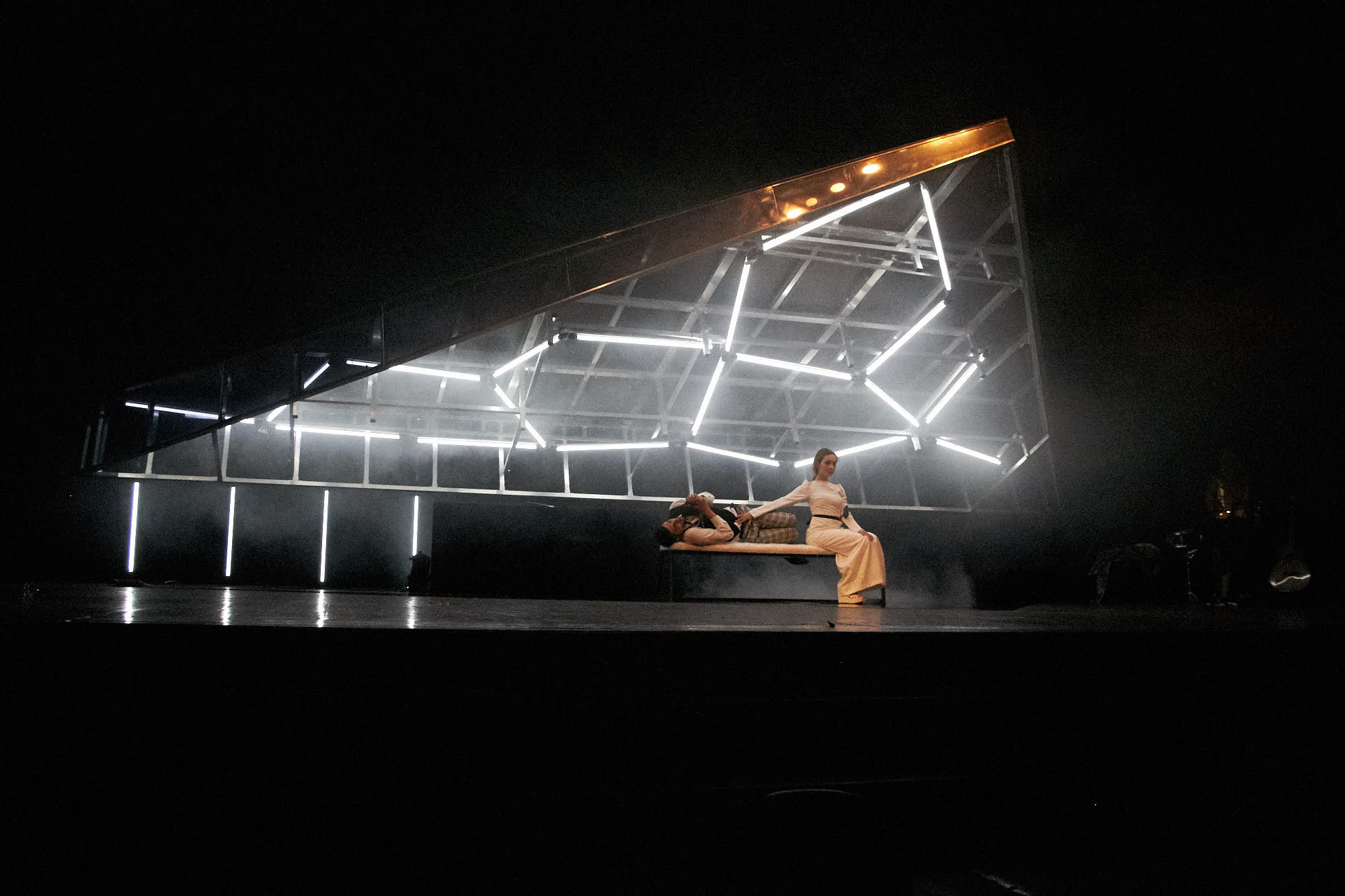
Five lives of Milutin – Atelier 212, 2018

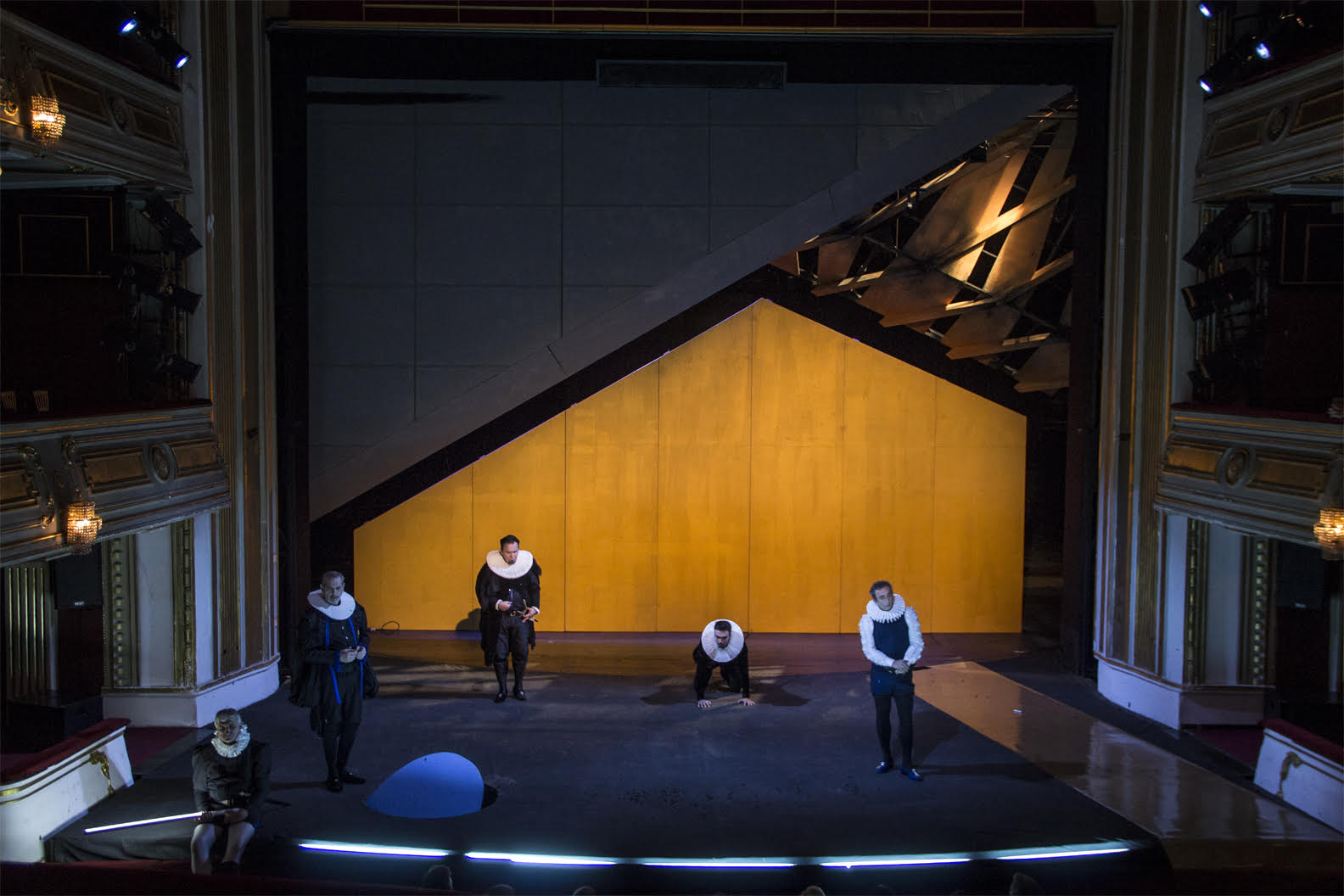
Mary Stuart – National Theatre in Belgrade, 2015

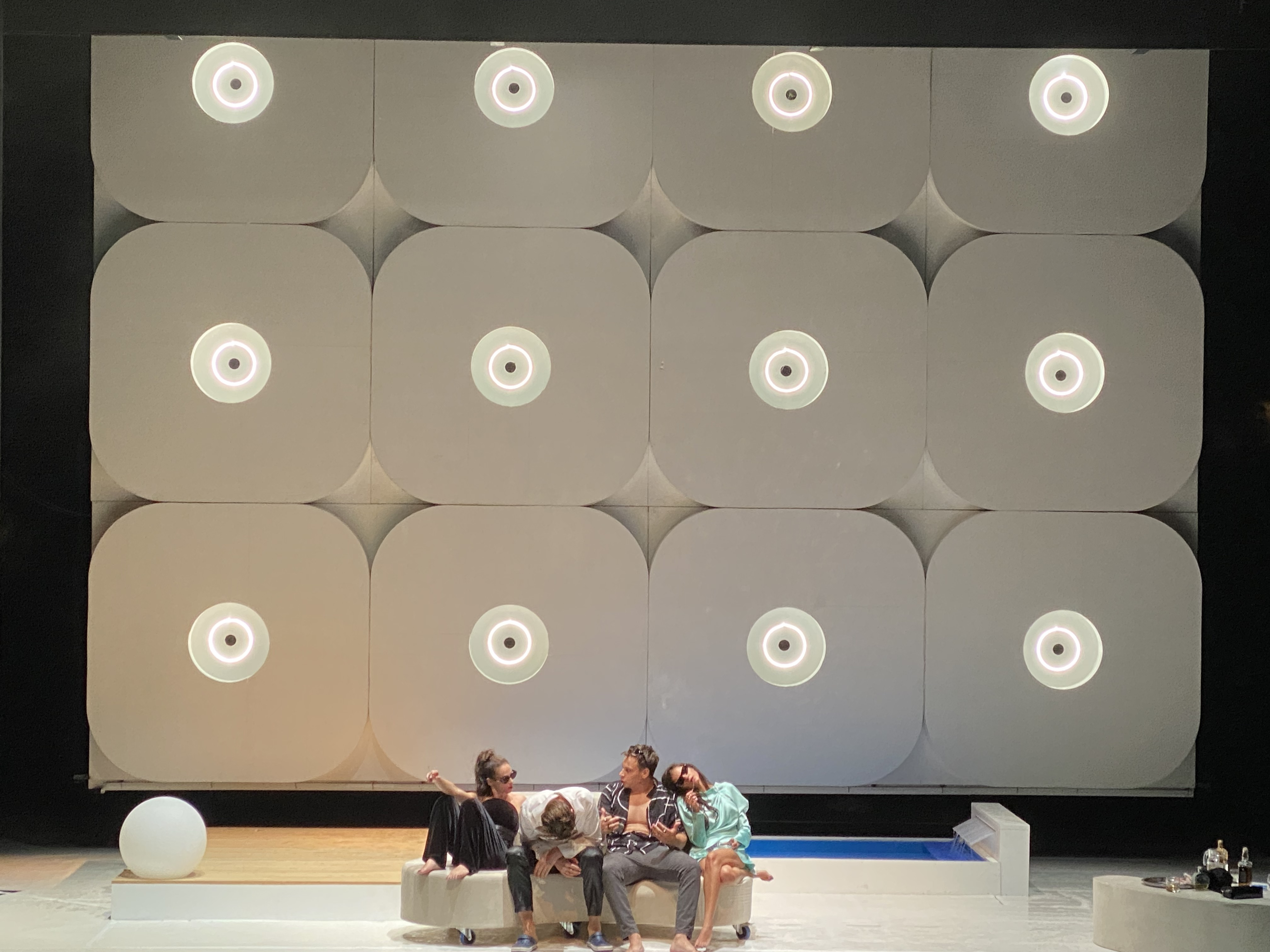
Pains of Youth - Yugoslav Drama Theatre, 2023

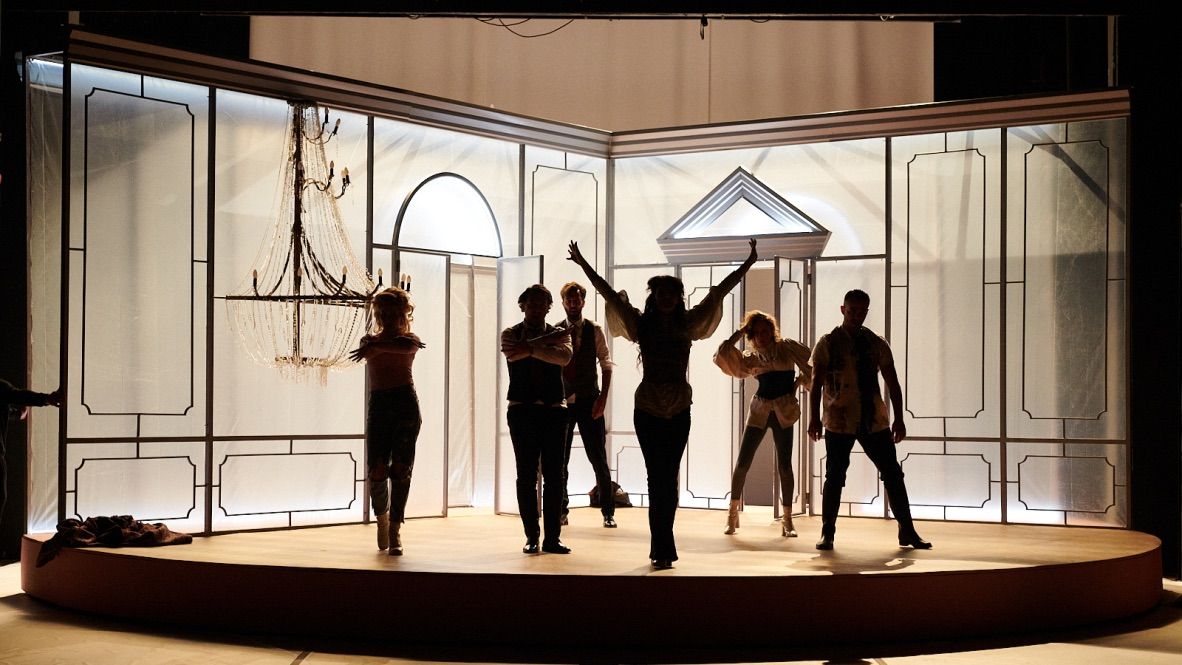
Children of the Sun - Montenegrin National Theatre, 2022

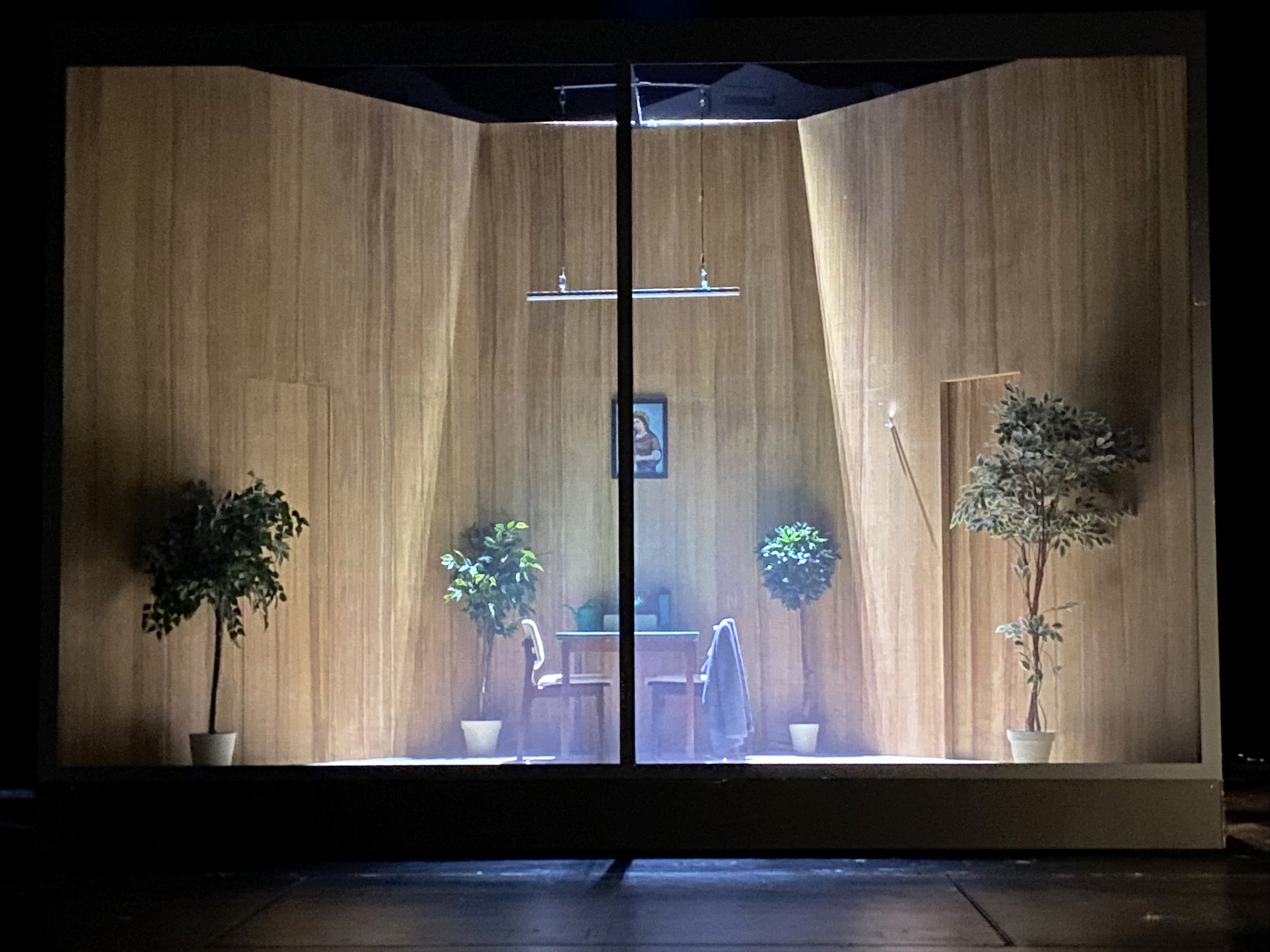
Unter Grund-Schauspielhuis Dortmund, 2023

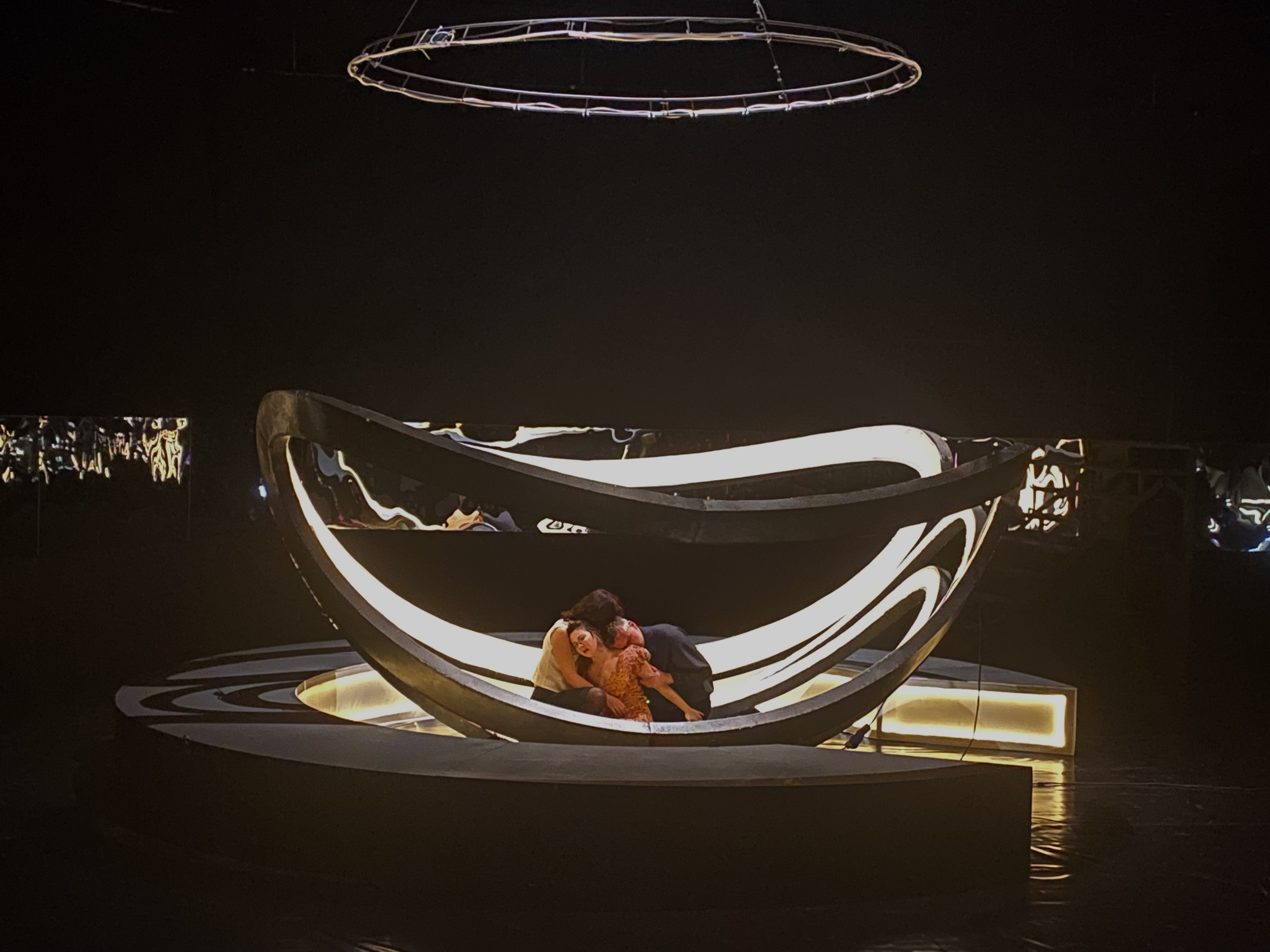
Middlesex - Serbian National Theatre, 2021

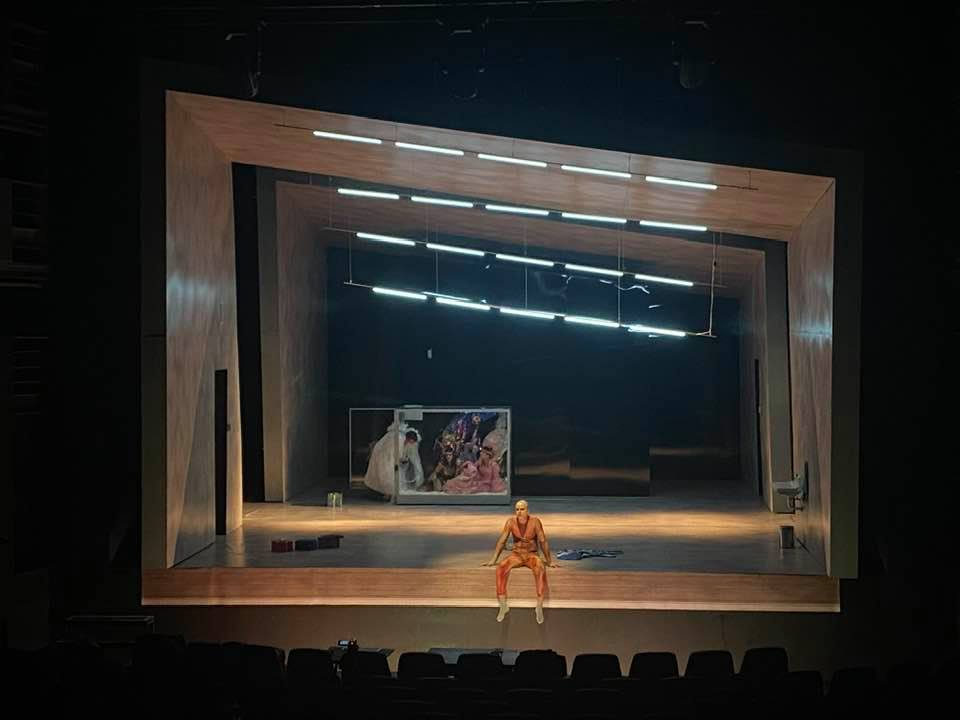
Kaspar - Yugoslav Drama Theatre, 2021

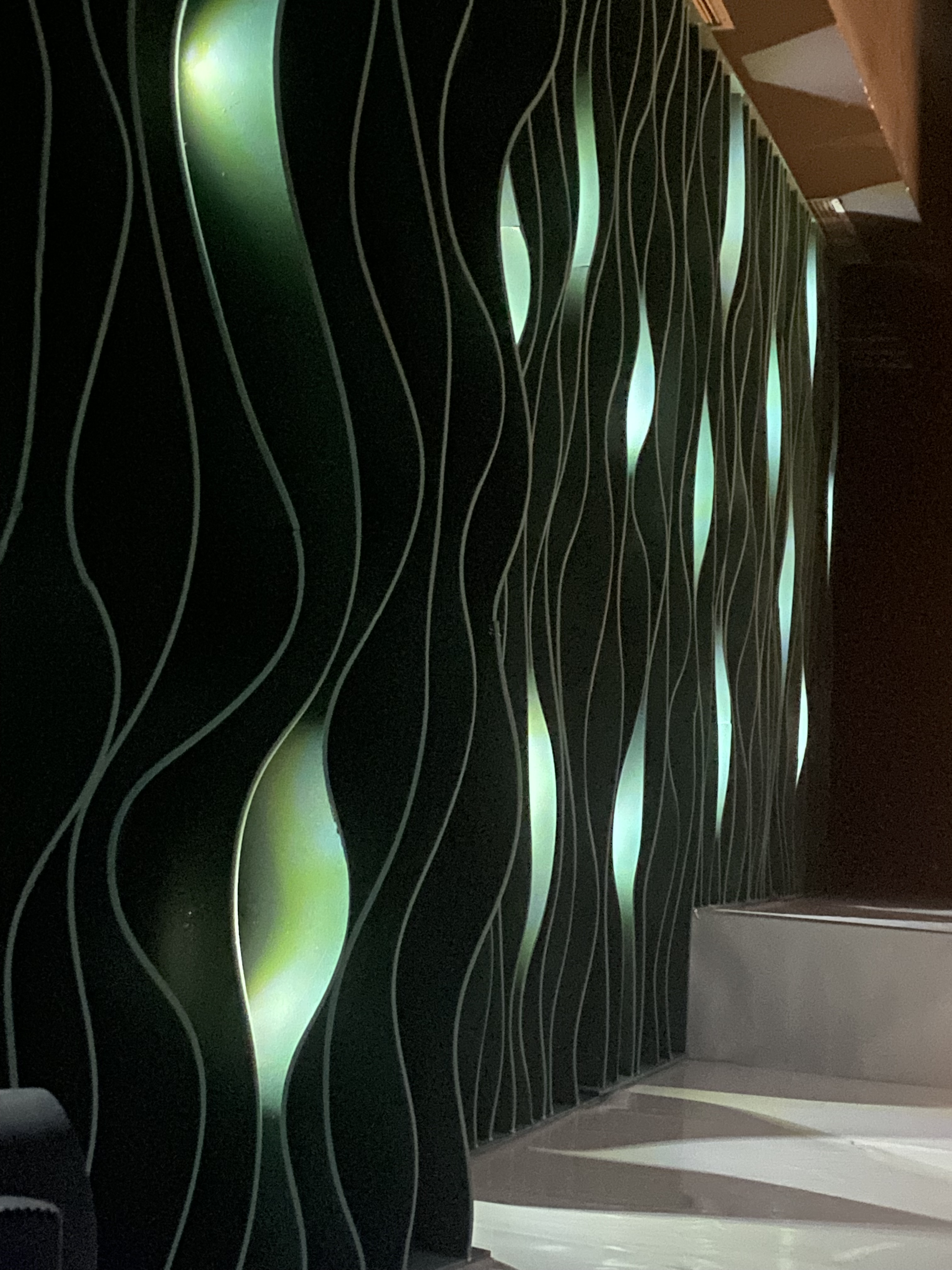
The Lustful Days of Hung Johnny - Novi Sad Theater – ÚjvidékiSzínház, 2021

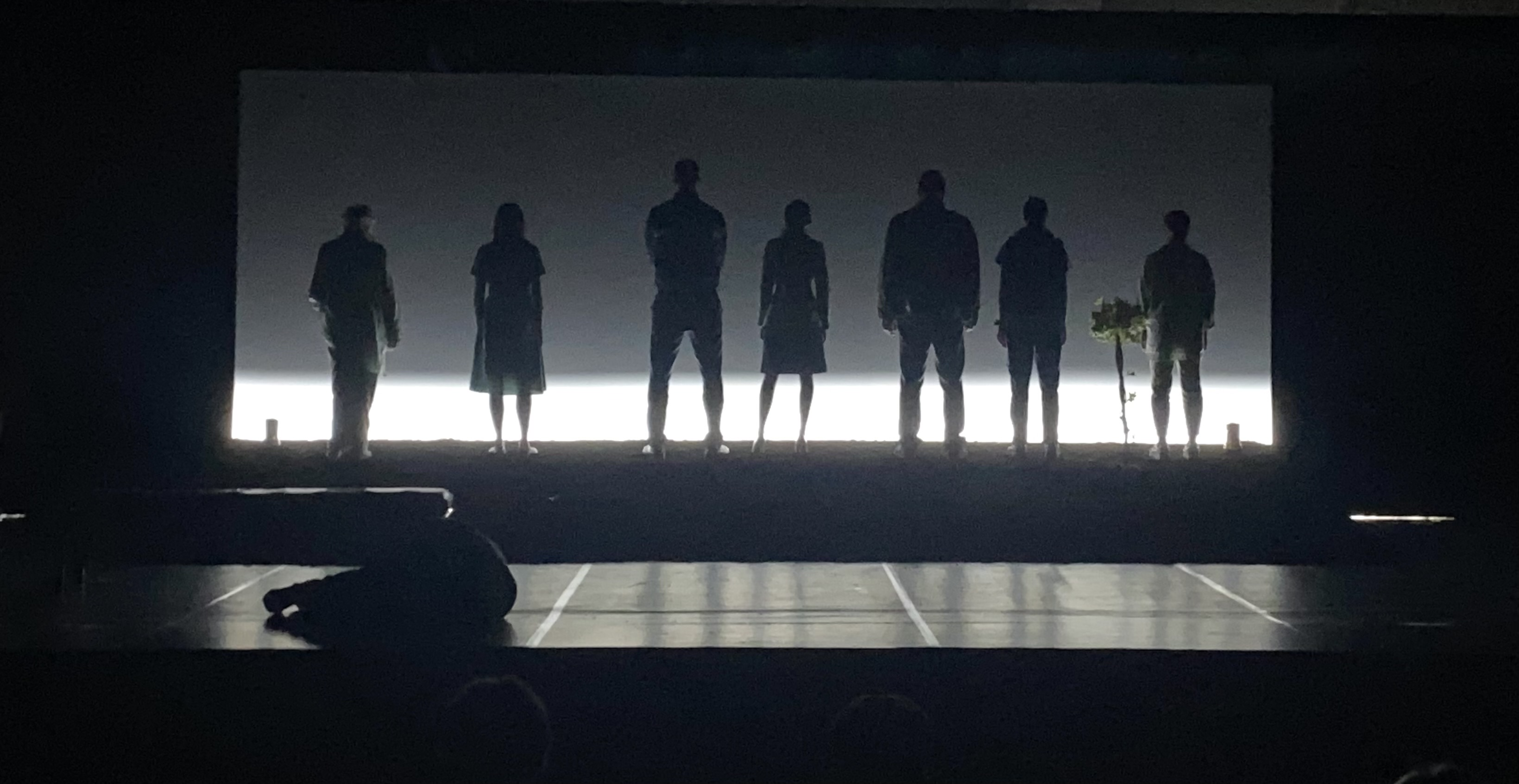
Disappearance - Atelier 212, 2024

Jasmina Holbus (born 21 November 1968) is a Serbian stage designer, poet and interior designer.

== Design work ==
Holbus graduated from Chelsea College of Arts in London in 1996 with a degree in interior design. She has been a member of the Association of Writers of Serbia since 1993 and a member of The Applied Artists and Designers Association of Serbia since 2007, holding the status of an independent artist.

She has been professionally engaged in interior design since 1997 and has designed residential and commercial spaces. Since 2015, she has been the co-owner and the director of a company which has designed and built a number of residential buildings in Belgrade.

Holbus resides and works in Belgrade. She has a son, Alex Julius Holbus, from a previous marriage to Yugoslav-Serbian ice hockey player Mirko Holbus.

== Bibliography ==
Holbus has been engaged in literary work since 1990. She took part in the Festival Voix Vives de méditerranée en méditerranée 2016, a poetry festival in Sète, France, during which her poetry was translated into French and published by Al Manar, within the 2016 edition of the poetry festival.

She has published fourteen collections of poems:

- Noći uzdaha (Nights of Sighs), Prometej, Novi Sad, 1990.(COBISS.SR 3167239)
- Ne mogu pobeći (I Can’t Escape), Prosveta, Belgrade, 1993.(COBISS.SR 51439111)
- Gde prestaje reč (Where Words Stop), Rad, Belgrade, 1994.(COBISS.SR 29573644)
- Bela (White), Plato, Belgrade, 2002.(COBISS.SR 99564812)
- Nemir (Unrest), Plato, Belgrade, 2002.(COBISS.SR 99564300)
- Šestar (Caliper), Plato, Belgrade, 2002.(COBISS.SR 99565068)
- Slagalica (Jigsaw), Plato, Belgrade, 2006.(COBISS.SR 131309324)
- Repozicija (Reposition), Plato, Belgrade, 2010.(COBISS.SR 174830860)
- Tempo, Plato, Belgrade, 2013.(COBISS.SR 218927628)
- Hipotenuza (Hypotenuse), Zlatno Runo, Belgrade, 2015.(COBISS.SR 216700428)
- Izbor (Choice), selection of poems from the previous ten published books, Zlatno Runo, Belgrade, 2015.(COBISS.SR 216700172)
- L’hypoténuse at autre poèmes, published by Al Manar, France, 2016 (ISBN 978-2-36426-074-0)
- Ampula (Ampoule), Zlatno Runo, Belgrade, 2021. (COBISS.SR-ID 46695177)
- 55 Pesama (55 Poems), Zlatno Runo, Belgrade, 2026.(COBISS.SR-ID 200094473)

== Theatre set design ==
Year	Theatre/ Ballet plays	Author	Director/ Choreographer	Theater / Production
2004	Big white plot	Dimitrije Vojnov	Miloš Lolić	Atelier 212
2006	The President and Eve of Retirement	Thomas Bernhard	Dino Mustafić	Yugoslav Drama Theatre
2006	Other side	Dejan Dukovski	Miloš Lolić	Yugoslav Drama Theatre
2007	Banat	Uglješa Šajtinc	Dejan Mijač	Yugoslav Drama Theatre
2007	Mensch Meier	Franz Xavier Kroetz	Miloš Lolić	Atelier 212
2008	Dreamers	Robert Muzil	Miloš Lolić	Yugoslav Drama Theatre
2009	A Flea in Her Ear (adaptation)	Greg Leaming	Ljubiša Ristić	Yugoslav Drama Theatre
2010	God is a DJ	Falk Richter	Miloš Lolić	Little Theatre "Duško Radović"
2011	Zoika's Apartment	Mikhail Bulgakov	Dejan Mijač	Serbian National Theatre
2012	Othello	William Shakespeare	Miloš Lolić	Yugoslav Drama Theatre
2014	The Journal of Carnojevic	Milos Crnjanski	Miloš Lolić	Yugoslav Drama Theatre
2014	Don Juan	Molière	Maša Kolar	Budva City Theatre & Bitef Dance Company
2014	Dali & Picasso	Fernando Arabal	Dimitrije Udovički	Bitef Theatre
2015	Triad	Libretista J. Holbus	Maša Kolar	Zagreb Dance Centre
2015	Mary Stuart	Friedrich Schiller	Miloš Lolić	National Theatre in Belgrade
2017	Macbeth	William Shakespeare	Miloš Isailović	XII Festival mediteranskog teatra Purgatorije
2017	Macbeth	William Shakespeare	Maša Kolar	Croatian National Theater
2017	The Wall, the Lake	Dushan Jovanovic	Miloš Lolić	Slovenian National Theater
2018	NORDOST	Torsten Buchsteiner	Jana Maričić	Bitef Teatar i Beo Art
2018	Five life's of sad Milutin	Milena Markovic	Alexandra Milavić Davies	Atelier 212
2018	Novel on London	Miloš Crnjanski	Ana Đorđević	Belgrade Drama Theater
2019	Nathan der Weise	Gotthold Ephraim Lessing	Jovana Tomić	Yugoslav Drama Theatre
2019	The Cave	Ivan Ilić & Slobodan Obradović	Jana Maričić	BELEF 2019 - Theatre Vuk
2019	La Celestina	Fernando de Rojas	Milan Nešković	Yugoslav Drama Theatre&City Theatre Budva
2019	Knives in Hens	David Harrower	Katarina Žutić	Atelier 212
2019	On the Darkening Green	Milena Marković	Jovana Tomić	National Theatre in Belgrade
2020	Motion	Dimitrije Kokanov	Jovana Tomić	Bitef Theatre
2020	The Screens	Jean Genet	Dino Mustafić	Novi Sad Theater/ Újvidéki Színház
2021	The Son	Florian Zeller	Ana Tomović	Atelier 212
2021	Kaspar	Peter Handke	Miloš Lolić	Yugoslav Drama Theatre
2021	The Lustful Days of Hung Johnny	Filip Grujić	Jovana Tomić	Novi Sad Theater – Újvidéki Színház
2021	Middlesex	Jeffrey Eugenides	Jovana Tomić	Serbian National Theatre
2022	Children of the Sun	Maxim Gorky	Jovana Tomić	Montenegrin National Theatre
2022	Holy Prada	Dimitrije Kokanov	Sanja Mitrović	Bitef Theatre
2022	Revolt. She Said. Revolt Again.	Alice Birch	Jovana Tomić	Atelier 212
2022	Yerma	Simon Stone	Ana Tomović	Montenegrin National Theatre
2023	Unter Grund	Sanja Mitrović	Sanja Mitrović	Schauspielhuis Dortmund
2023	The Loser	Thomas Bernhard A.S. Pushkin	Nataša Radulović	Yugoslav Drama Theatre
2023	Pains of Youth	Ferdinand Bruckner	Jovana Tomić	Yugoslav Drama Theatre
2023	Adam and Eve	Miroslav Krleža	Maša Kolar	Croatian National Theater in Rijeka
2024	I Dreamed That I Woke Up	Željko Hubač	Dino Mustafić	National Theatre in Belgrade
2024	Disappearance	Tomislav Zajec	Sanja Mitrović	Atelier 212
2025	Birds of a Kind	Wajdi Mouawad	Dino Mustafić	Belgrade Drama Theatre
2025	The Picture of Dorian Gray	Oscar Wilde	Nataša Radulović	Yugoslav Drama Theatre

== Participation in other projects and exhibitions ==
Holbus has been the creator of various multimedia projects in architecture and graphic design, as well as audio-video installations. She worked as the art director for the project Bojan Z. Sextet in Sava Centre, Belgrade, and the Synagogue in Novi Sad in 2013. She was the creator of video works for Bojan Zulfikarpašić's tour of his jazz piano album Shelter with a View, which toured France, Belgium, the Netherlands, and Switzerland in 2014 and 2015. She was also the author of the multimedia art research project Let's Talk, exhibited in 2016 at the Gallery Štab in Belgrade.

From the fall of 2026, Jasmina is working as the author on new multimedia research art work PROJECT 55 - Phenomenology of Bodily and Poetic Space.

== Awards ==
- 2009 - GRAND PRIX FOR BEST PLAY MIRA TRAILOVIĆ presented by BITEF Festival ″Dreamers″ by Robert Musil, directed by Miloš Lolić | production Yugoslavian Drama Theatre
- 2013 - ANNUAL AWARD FOR BEST SCENOGRAPHY presented by The Association of Fine Arts Artists & Designers of Serbia, for special artistic contribution in the production of ″Othello″ by W. Shakespeare, directed by Miloš Lolić | Yugoslav Drama Theatre
- 2017 - SPECIAL AWARD FOR ARTISTIC ACHIEVEMENT | XII Festival of Mediterranean Theater Purgatory ″Macbeth″ by W. Shakespeare, choreography by M. Isailović Production Bitef Theater (Serbia) & Cultural Center (Montenegro)
- 2018 - AWARD FOR BEST PLAY | ″Nord-Ost″ (North East) by Torsten Buchsteiner, directed by Jana Maričić | production Bitef Theater & Beo Art, Presented by audience at the Borin Theater Days, Serbia
- 2018 - ARDALION - AWARD FOR BEST SCENOGRAPHY | XXIII Yugoslavian Theater Festival (Serbia) ″Five life’s of sad Milutin″ by Milena Marković, directed by Alexandra Milavic Davies Production Atelier 212; Belgrade, Serbia
- 2019 - ANNUAL AWARD FOR THE BEST ARTISTIC ACHIEVEMENT | ″Nathan der Weise″ by Gotthold Ephraim Lessing, directed by Jovana Tomić | Yugoslavian Drama Theatre, Serbia
- 2021 - ANNUAL AWARD FOR THE BEST SET DESIGN & special artistic contribution in the production of ″Kaspar″ by Peter Handke, directed by Miloš Lolić | Yugoslavian Drama Theatre
