= Dejan Tofčević =

Dejan Tofčević (Serbian Cyrillic: Дејан Тофчевић; born on 10 June 1971 in Užice, Serbia, but spent his childhood in Bajina Bašta, Serbia) is a writer of satirical short forms such as aphorisms, short stories and poetry. He works as an air traffic controller at Podgorica airport.

== Bibliography ==
Tofčević's first book, aphorisms In Black and White (Crno na belo, 2002) was followed by Anthology of Montenegrin Aphorisms – Infreqent Particles (Antologija crnogorskog aforizma – Rijetke čestice, 2006) together with Savo Martinović and Veljko Rajković, and Prediction of The Past (Predskazanje prošlosti, 2009)

Tofčević's aphorisms have already been translated into Bulgarian, Macedonian, English and Finnish.

== Awards ==
Dejan Tofčević has won the international "Golden Helmet Award", the "Rade Brka Award", the "Žikišon Award" and the "Čivijada Award"; as well as various other awards: "The Best Aphorism Writer" and "The Best Satirist" at the Montenegrin Festival of Humour and Satire in Danilovgrad and the "Prosvjetni rad" award for short stories. Tofčević has been nominated for Politika's award for satire "Vlada Bulatović-Vib" two times.
