= Mirjana Stefanović =

Serbian writer (1939–2021)

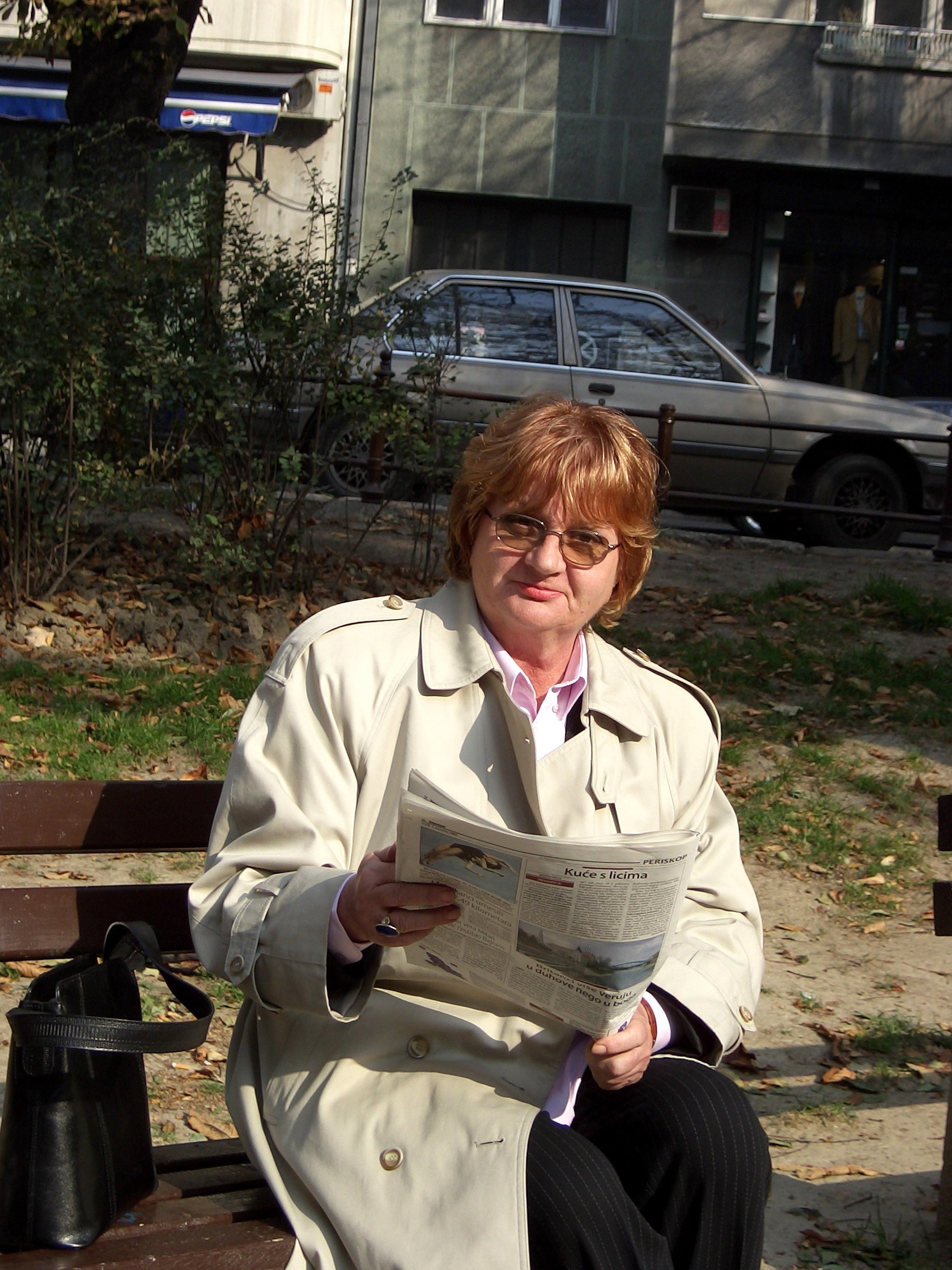
- Stefanović in 2015
- Born: 24 October 1939; Niš, Yugoslavia (now Serbia)
- Died: 10 August 2021 (aged 81); Belgrade, Serbia
- Occupations: Poet and writer
- Writing career
- Genres: Poetry and prose

Mirjana Stefanović (Serbian Cyrillic: Мирјана Стефановић; 24 October 1939 – 10 August 2021) was a Serbian writer.

== Biography ==
She had lived in Niš, Kosančić and Novi Sad, and had been living in Belgrade since 1951. She attended school in Novi Sad, Belgrade and Delhi, India. She held an M.A. in English literature.

In the 1966–1967 period she worked as a journalist, a contributor to Radio Belgrade's Third Programme, and from 1967 to 1973 she worked as a redactor for Radio Belgrade's Children's Programme. From 1974 to 1991, she worked as an editor in the Nolit publishing house. She established the Holiday edition, which she edited for sixteen years, within the framework of which she published more than fifty books for the young selected from the corpus of world and domestic literature. She also participated in editing poetry and was the editor of the Interesting Science edition. She was the editor-in-chief of the First Book edition at Matica srpska (1974–1979) and a member of the editorial staff of Letopis Matice srpske (1982–1983).

She is regarded as one of the first urban, modern Serbian women poets, who left a lasting mark in the literature during her 60 years of work.

== Works ==
=== Books for adults ===
- Voleti, poems, Matica srpska, Novi Sad, 1960.
- Odlomci izmišljenog dnevnika, prose, Maticasrpska, Novi Sad, 1961.
- Proleće na Terazijama, poems, Prosveta, Belgrade, 1967.
- Indigo, poems, Nolit, Belgrade, 1973.
- Radni dan, poems, Matica srpska, Novi Sad, 1979.
- Savetnik, prose, BIGZ, Belgrade, 1979.
- Prošireni savetnik, prose, Književna zajednica Novog Sada, Novi Sad, 1987.
- Pomračenje, poems, "Fondi Oryja Pala", New Belgrade-Kranj, 1995, second edition:Beogradski krug and Centar za antiratnu akciju, Belgrade, 1996.
- Iskisli čovek, selected poems, Nolit, Belgrade, 2003.
- O jabuci, prose, Dnevnik, Novi Sad, 2009.
- Promaja, selected and new poems, Zadužbina Desanka Maksimović, Narodna biblioteka Srbije, Belgrade, 2011.
- Škola života, selected poems, Grupa 484, Belgrade, 2012.
- Održi plamen, selected and new poems, Društvo pisaca Bosne i Hercegovine, Međunarodna književna manifestacija "Sarajevski dani poezije", Sarajevo, 2013.
- Trap, poems, Narodna biblioteka „Stefan Prvovenčani”, Kraljevo, 2018.
- Izabrane pesme, poems, Kulturni centar Vojvodine „Miloš Crnjanski”, Novi Sad, 2020.

=== Books for children ===
- Vlatko Pidžula, poems and stories, Prosveta, Belgrade, 1962, second edition: Narodna knjiga, Belgrade, 2007.
- Enca sa kredenca, poems, Radivoj Ćirpanov, Novi Sad, 1969, 1975, Veselin Masleša, Sarajevo, 1978.
- Štrickalice, stories, BIGZ, Belgrade, 1972.
- Šta da radi ova fota?, novel, Nolit, Belgrade, 1979, Glas, Banja Luka, 1989, Dnevnik, NoviSad, 2003.
- Mit érdemel az a bűnös, the Hungarian edition of the novel Šta da radi ova fota?, Forum, NoviSad, 1984.
- Drugari sa repom, four picture books with illustrations by Marko Krsmanović, Nolit, Belgrade, 1985.
- Šola za velike, stories, translation into Slovenian, Mladinska knjiga, Ljubljana, 1985.
- Čudo do čuda, stories, Vuk Karadžić, Belgrade, 1986.
- Sekino seoce, novel, IP GINKO, Ginis Yu, Belgrade, 1994.
- Zlatne ribice, poems and stories, Matica srpska, NoviSad, 1994.
- O Uglješi, poems, Prosveta, Belgrade, 1996, author's edition: Belgrade, 2000.
- Škola ispod stola, poems and stories, Portal, Belgrade, 2004.
- Prvi poljubac, selected plays for children, Bookland, Belgrade, 2010.
- Somot i svila, selected poems and stories, "Smederevska pesnička jesen", Smederevo, 2011.
- Together with Katarina Granata-Savić, she edited the book Moja majka – pisci govore o svojim majkama, Zmajeve dečje igre, Novi Sad, 2007.

=== Plays ===
- Leći na rudu, TV play, TV Belgrade, 1968.
- Beli zečevi, TV play, TV Belgrade, 1970.
- Kakav dan, TV play, TV Belgrade, 1979.
- Škola života, TV play, TV Belgrade, 1980.
- Činiti čin, an experiment in language, music composed by Dušan Radić, Radio Belgrade's Third Programme, 1965.
- Urlikologija, radio play, Radio Belgrade's Third Programme, 1968.
- Cecilija od Cimberije, theatrical play for children, the Boško Buha Theatre, Belgrade, 1969.

Radio Belgrade and other Yugoslav radio stations have broadcast a number of Mirjana Stefanović's radio plays for children; a selection of these was published in the book Prvi poljubac.

=== Translations ===
She translated the following Indian novels from English into the Serbian language:

- Thakazhi Sivasankara Pillai: Prawns, Nolit, Belgrade, 1966.
- Balachandra Rajan: The Dark Dancer, Prosveta, Belgrade, 1977.

=== Anthologies and panoramas ===
Poems and stories by Mirjana Stefanović have been included in around eighty anthologies and panoramas in Serbian and in other languages.

- Sveta Lukić, Vuk Krnjević: Posleratni srpski pesnici, Nolit, Belgrade, 1970.
- Stevan Radovanović, Slobodan Radaković: Srpske pesnikinje od Jefimije do danas, Slovo ljubve, Belgrade, 1972.
- Milovan Vitezović: Antologija savremene srpske satirične priče, Jež, Belgrade, 1980.
- Vuk Krnjević: Med resničostjo in snom, antologija srpske poezije XX stoletija, Cankareva založba, Ljubljana, 1984.
- Stevan Tontić: Moderno srpsko pjesništvo - velika knjiga moderne srpske poezije od Laze Kostića do danas, Svjetlost, Sarajevo, 1991.
- Гане Тодоровски и Паскал Гилевски: Српската поезија во XIX и XX век, Скопје, 2000.
- Radmila Lazić: Mačke ne idu u raj - antologija savremene ženske poezije, Samizdat Free B92, Belgrade, 2000.
- Bojana Stojanović Pantović: Srpske prozaide - antologija srpskih pesama u prozi, Nolit, Belgrade, 2001.
- Bojana Stojanović Pantović: Nebolomstvo, panorama srpskog pesništva kraja XX veka, Durieux, Zagreb, 2006.
- Časlav Đorđević: Srpski sonet, Službeni glasnik, Belgrade, 2009.
- Branko Matan: Povijest u stihovima, Gordogan, Zagreb, 2009.
- Ivana Maksić, Predrag Milojević: Do zuba u vremenu, Presing, Mladenovac-Belgrade, 2014.
- Božo Koprivica i Lazar Ristovski: Antologija ljubavne poezije srpske, Zillion film, Belgrade, 2012.
- Bora Ćosić: Dečja poezija srpska, edicija Srpska književnost u sto knjiiga, Matica srpska, Novi Sad, Srpska književna zadruga, Belgrade, 1965.
- Vladimir Milarić: Zeleni bregovi detinjstva, "Radivoj Ćirpanov", Novi Sad, 1970, 1977.
- Zvonimir Balog: Zlatna knjiga svjetske poezije za djecu, Nakladni zavod Matice hrvatske, Zagreb, 1975.
- Niko Grafenauer: Pa mi verjamete, izbor jugoslovanskega modernega pesništva za mladino, Mladinska knjiga, Ljubljana, 1980.
- Leonid Jahnin: Dvenadcat slonov, Detska literatura, Moscow, 1983.
- Vladimir Milarić: Roža čudotvorna, antologija sodobnega jugoslovanskega pesništva za otroke, Mladinska knjiga, Ljubljana, 1985.
- Dragan Lakićević: Antologija srpske poezije za decu, Bookland, Belgrade, 1995.
- Milovan Vitezović: Antologija svetske poezije za decu, Dereta, Belgrade, 2001.
- Raša Popov: Sto najlepših pesama za decu, YU marketing press, Belgrade, 2002.
- Pop D. Đurđev: Dva alava lava, ludoteka savremene srpske poezije za decu, Dnevnik, Novi Sad, 2003.
- Raša Popov, Pop D. Đurđev: Всичко, което растне би искало да пее, antologija srpske dečje poezije na bugarskom, Zmajeve dečje igre, Novi Sad - Niš, 2006.

== Awards and accolades ==
Her awards include:

- The Award of the Novi Sad Youth Panel for the manuscript of the book Odlomci izmišljenog dnevnika, 1959.
- The Neven Award for Vlatko Pidžula, the best children's book in Serbia in 1962.
- The Politikin zabavnik Award for Sekino seoce, the best children's book in Yugoslavia in 1994.
- The Zmajeve dečje igre Award for exceptional creative contribution to children's literature, 1995.
- The Pro Femina Award for the book of poetry Pomračenje 1997.
- The Desanka Maksimović Award for overall poetic work and contribution to Serbian poetry, 2010. On the occasion of the presentation of the award, a scientific conference dealing with the recipient's poetic opus was organised, and the conference papers were published in the collection of papers entitled Poezija Mirjane Stefanović, the Desanka Maksimović Foundation, Belgrade, 2012.
- The Zlatni ključić Smedereva Award, for lifetime achievement in the domain of children's literature, 2011.
- The Gašino zlatno pero Award, for lifetime achievement and "contribution to the carefree spirit of childhood", Lazarevac, 2012.
- The Bosanski stećak Award, given by the jury of the international literary event The Sarajevo Poetry Days, 2013. She was the first female recipient of this award, whose former recipients include Tadeusz Różewicz, Christopher Merrill, Charles Simić, Mirko Kovač, Luko Paljetak...
