= Rade Jovanović (singer) =

Serbian singer and poet

Rade Jovanović (Serbian Cyrillic: Раде Јовановић; Kruševac, Serbia, former Yugoslavia in 1971) is a Serbian singer and poet.

== Biography ==
He writes for youths and adults. Many of his poems are present in anthologies of contemporary poetry for children, also in school-books and educational reading-books. He has published eight collections of poems – five for children and three for adults. He is one of the most popular poet of younger generation among the children, parents and school teachers in his country.

Titles of his books:

- Šestica prolazi kroz grad (poems, 1993.)
- Dan za bezdan (poems, 1994.)
- Da se igra ne zaboravi (poems, 1996.)
- Sreċa se smeši tu, iza suze (poems, 1997.)
- Dok je čekam (poems, 2003.)
- Zvezdana (poems, 2005.)
- Država deteta (poems, 2006.)
- Moja omiljena knjiga (poems, 2008.)
- Lajte kere Sarengrada (novel, 2009.)
