= Vesna Nešić Nedić =

Serbian writer and journalist

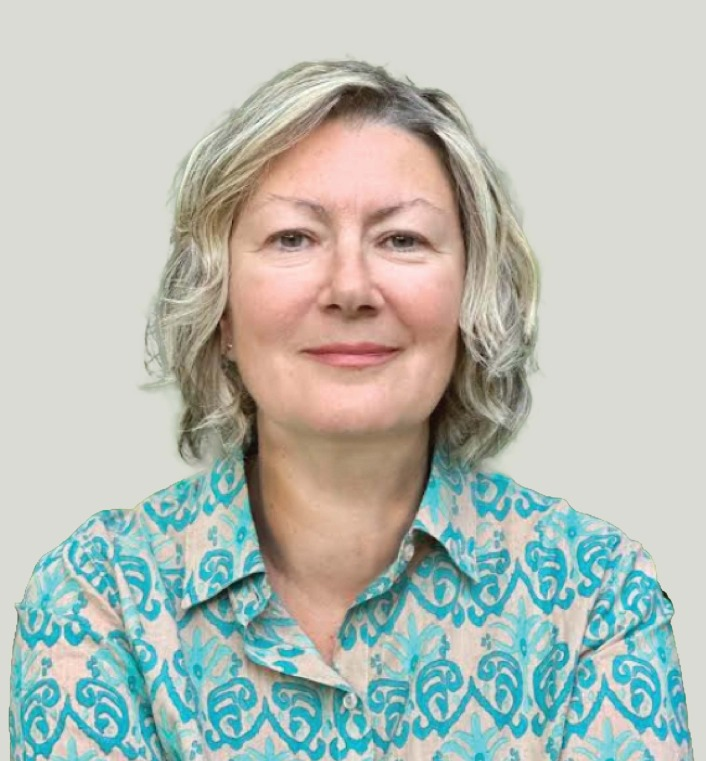
- Born: Весна Нешић Недић; December 17, 1964 (age 61); Belgrade, SFR Yugoslavia
- Website: vesnanedic.com

Vesna Nešić Nedić (Serbian Cyrillic: Весна Нешић Недић; born December 17, 1964) is a Serbian writer and journalist from Toronto, Canada.

== Life and career ==
She was born in Belgrade, where she lived until moving to Greece in 1992. In 1999, she immigrated to Toronto. Since 2014, she has been an active representative of the Serbian community in Canada. In the 1980s and 1990s, she was editing the student newspaper of the Faculty of Civil Engineering at the University of Belgrade. Then she worked for Politikin Zabavnik and Studio B, and after leaving for Canada for the Novine Toronto newspaper.

Since 2014, she has been actively engaged in journalism and writing. In 2014, together with a team of like-minded people, she came up with the idea of starting the Serbian Canadian Magazine (SAN). The first issue of the SAN magazine came in in July 2015 and is published quarterly every three months. Through the role of the magazine's Editor-in-Chief, but also independently, Vesna Nešić Nedić actively participates and organizes notable events and tries to contribute as much as possible to connecting the overall Serbian diaspora on multiple levels.

Her first published literary work, in Serbian and English, is the prose collection At the End of the World and Other Stories, for which she received a Certificate of Appreciation from Yvan Baker, Member of Parliament for Etobicoke Centre. She published the novel The White City in 2023.

The Cultural and Educational Community of Serbia awarded her the Gold Badge in 2021.

She is included in the Encyclopedia of the National Diaspora, edited by chronicler Ivan Kalauzović Ivanus.

She is a member of the Association of Journalists of Serbia.

== Literature ==
- Kalauzović, I., ed. (2025). Encyclopedia of the National Diaspora. Niš, Serbia: Impressions Publishing. ISBN 978-86-82470-02-1.
