= Svetlana Lukić =

Serbian journalist

Svetlana Lukić (born December 14, 1958) is a Serbian journalist.

She was born in Belgrade and received a degree in journalism from the Belgrade College of Political Sciences. Lukić hosted the radio show Niko kao ja on Radio Belgrade from 1987 to 1993; in 1990, she received an award from the Serbian Journalists Association for her work on this show. She was dismissed from Radio Belgrade in 1993 and joined Radio Brod, a project sponsored by the European Union, reporting on the war in the former Yugoslavia. In 1994, she joined B92 radio, as the editor for the shows Fantom slobode (Phantom of freedom) and Pescanik (the Hourglass).

In 2017, Lukić has signed the Declaration on the Common Language of the Croats, Serbs, Bosniaks and Montenegrins.

== Awards and honours ==
The show Pescanik was given the Press Freedom Award – Signal for Europe by Reporters without Borders Austria. Lukić has also received the Jug Grizelj award, the Dušan Bogavac award, the Konstantin Obradović award and the Belgrade City Journalism Award.
