= Baja Saitović-Lukin =

Baja Saitović-Lukin was a Roma Serbian writer, poet, translator, and government advisor. He was the winner of the Open Society Institute Roma Literary Award with Special Distinction.

Saitović-Lukin was born in Prokuplje in 1954. He served as an advisor for Roma issues to the Serbian Ministry of Human and Minority Rights. He died in 2017.
