= Scribe Bratko =

13th c. Serbian Orthodox scribe

Scribe Bratko (Serbian Братко), also known as Pop Bratko, was a 13th-century Serbian Orthodox presbyter and scribe who wrote the liturgical calendar book (menaion) during the rule of Stefan Vladislav I of Serbia for feudal lord Obrad. It is the oldest menaion in Serbian literature, written in the Serbian recension of Old Church Slavonic (Old Serbian).
