= Jelena Đurović =

Montenegrin journalist, writer, and political activist (born 1973)

- Jelena Djurovic
- Đurović in 2007
- Born: 13 July 1973 (age 53); Belgrade, SR Serbia, Yugoslavia
- Education: University of Arts in Belgrade (BA)
- Occupations: Journalist; writer; political activist
- Years active: 2003–present
- Spouse: Tomica Orešković (m. 2009)

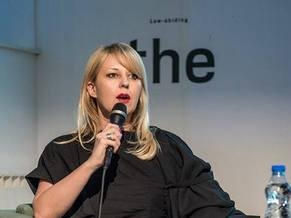
Đurović in 2015

Jelena Đurović (Serbian Cyrillic: Јелена Ђуровић; born 13 July 1973) is Montenegrin journalist, writer, feminist, LGBT activist known for her work in media, cultural and community organizations. She had worked as activist within the Jewish community of Montenegro and Serbia. She is the chairwoman of the OJC SEE board, and a member of the Council of the Montenegrin National Community of Belgrade.

== Early life and education ==
Đurović was born on July 13, 1973, in Belgrade, SR Serbia, Yugoslavia, to a Montenegrin father and a Jewish mother. She earned a bachelor of arts from the University of Arts in Belgrade.

== Literary work ==
Đurović graduated from the Department of Theater and Radio Production at the Faculty of Dramatic Arts in Belgrade. Her bachelor's thesis, Theatre in the Shadow of the Gallows, examined the programming policies of Belgrade theatres during the Slobodan Milošević presidency. Her bachelor’s thesis examined theatre programming in Belgrade during the presidency of Slobodan Milošević.

Đurović's first novel, Kingdom, was published in 2003. Excerpts from the novel were published in Voices from the Faultline, A Balkan Anthology.

Her second novel, February 30, was published in 2011.

== Journalism ==
In 1994 and 1995, Đurović worked at the Belgrade radio station Studio B, sponsored by the Soros Fund, as author and editor of the weekly radio show Time In.

In 2005, Đurović launched the AgitPop blog, a Serbian platform combining pop culture and political commentary. Đurović also contributed to several Serbian newspapers and magazines. She later worked with the editorial team of Novi Radio Beograd, a Serbian internet radio station. From 23 February 2013, her radio show was broadcast on the Serbian national radio station B92 until the station became Play Radio.

During the COVID-19 pandemic, Đurović and Rabbi Uri Ayalon from Jerusalem collaborated on A Rabbi and a Film Critic Walk into a Bar, a podcast about Jewish topics.

== Personal life and activism ==
Đurović is the founder and former vice president of the Jewish Community of Montenegro. She is the chairwoman of the OJC SEE board, and a member of the Council of the Montenegrin National Community of Belgrade. She lives in Belgrade and Podgorica.

== Selected publications ==
- Kingdom (2003)
- February 30 (2011)
