= Nenad Trajković (poet) =

Serbian poet (born 1982)

- Born: Nenad Trajković; 1 June 1982 (age 44); Pirot, Yugoslavia
- Occupation: Poet
- Spouse: Tatjana Ćuković Trajković

Nenad Trajković (born 1 June 1982) is a Serbian poet, essayist, literary critic and translator.

== Biography ==
Nenad Trajković was born in 1982 in Pirot.

He graduated from Faculty of Law, University of Kragujevac. He has published four collections of poetry, Traces- 2008, I'm Taking You to the Museum – 2011, and Wind From The Tongue – 2016 (The Rade Tomic prize) and Thinner Line of Infinity – 2019 (9th fb European poetry festival award). His works are published in many major literary magazines and national newspapers. His works were translated into English, Russian, Slovakian, German, French, Polish, Bulgarian, Spanish, Hungarian, Hindi, Turkish, Romanian, Hebrew, Greek and Macedonian. In 2013 he received a significant recognition by the publishing house "Melnik" in Bulgaria. He got the Rade Tomic Prize for 2015. He lives and works in Vranje in southern Serbia. He is an editor of the International Literary Manifestation Pisanija in Vranje.

== Bibliography ==
=== Poetry collections ===
- Traces 2008, Vranje ISBN 978-86-87391-00-0.
- I'm Taking You to the Museum 2011, Vranjske knjige, Vranje ISBN 978-86-84287-70-2.
- Wind From The Tongue 2016, Istok, Knjazevac, The Rade Tomic prize ISBN 978-86-89981-03-2
- Thinner Line of Infinity 2019, Banatski kulturni centar

=== Collections in translations by Trajkovic ===
- The Hero of the Forgotten Class (org. Heroj zaboravljene klase), Zvonko Taneski 2017 ISBN 978-86-89981-05-6
- Secret Letters, Slavica Gadžova Sviderska 2018
- The Lord in My Mind, Jovica Tasevski Eternijan 2018

=== Anthologies ===
- Моя сербская антология, Saint Petersburg, Russia, 2018
- World Poetry, Mongolia,2018
- ¿Qué pasa contigo Venezuela?, Venezuela, 2018
- Whispers of Soflay: Yearly Anthology of Poetry, Pakistan, 2018
- Gracias a la vida, Chile, 2018.
- Од А до Ш / Von A bis Z, 9th centuries of Serbian poetry, bilingual edition in German and Serbian language, 2017.
- Between Two Worlds, Niš, 2012.
- Arte Versus, Belgrade, 2013.
- A Soaring Street, Inđija, 2014.
- My Love, I Am Calling You With a Longing, Mrkonjić Grad, 2014.
- Lepenicko Djurdjevdarje, Kragujevac, 2015.

=== Literary magazines ===
- Poem, England
- Picaroon Poetry, England
- Zlatna greda, Serbia
- Balkan Poetry Today, England
- Letopis Matice srpske, Serbia
- Koraci, Serbia
- Bagdala, Serbia
- Književne novine, Serbia
- Polja, Serbia
- Gradina, Serbia
- Stremljenja, Serbia
- Istok, Serbia
- Sent, Serbia
- Trag, Serbia
- Literarni otisak, Serbia
- Bdenje, Serbia
- Dometi, Serbia
- Eckermann
- Savremenik, Serbia
- Sovremenost, Republic of Macedonia
- Rast, Republic of Macedonia
- Branuvanje, Republic of Macedonia
- Свежий взгляд, Russia
- Romboid Slovakia
- Ријеч, Република Српска
- Modern Literature, India
- Duane's PoeTree
- Random Poem Tree, Trinidad and Tobago
- Advaitam Speaks Literary, India
- Azahar, Spain
- Voices de la Luna, United States
- Detectiv Cultural, Romania
- The Pangolin Review, Mauritania

== Awards ==
- Publishing House Melnik, Bulgaria – 2013.
- The Rade Tomic Prize, Serbia – 2015
- Campionatul Mondial de Poezie, special prize by the jury, Sinaia, Romania, 2018
- European FB festival, 2018
