= Savo Martinović =

Savo Martinović (Serbian Cyrillic: Саво Мартиновић; born 1935 in Danilovgrad, Zeta Banovina, Yugoslavia) is a Montenegrin-Serbian satirist. He lives in Belgrade, Serbia since the 1950s. He is a member of the brotherhood of Serbian writers.

== Quotes ==
- "Beograđanin sam više od pola vijeka, kako bi rekao Beštić, a to nije malo. Sekciji i Krugu pripadam, jer sam među svojima."
