= Vladan Vukosavljević =

Vladan Vukosavljević may refer to:

- Vladan Vukosavljević (basketball) (born 1984), Serbian basketball player
- Vladan Vukosavljević (politician) (born 1962), Serbian politician
