= Zoran Spasojević =

Serbian writer

- Born: January 22, 1949; Kragujevac, Socialist Republic of Serbia, SFR Yugoslavia
- Died: August 5, 2025 (aged 76); Kragujevac, Serbia

Zoran Spasojević

Zoran Spasojević (Serbian Cyrillic: Зоран Спасојевић; born January 22, 1949, in Kragujevac, died August 5, 2025, in Kragujevac), was a Serbian writer.

== Biography ==
He has had published fourteen books and one compact disc.

He is also the author of the screenplay for a television comedy serial Without a Title (2000) and a radio drama Short history of alternating standing and falling (2004).

He has been published in more than seventy anthologies and collections of poetry, short stories, short drama and satire.

In addition to writing, he makes digital graphics and mail art works. His digital graphics can be seen in numerous internet magazines, newspapers and books.

He has received many awards for his works.

He is a member of the Association of drama writers of Serbia and the Association of Serbian writers.

== Book ==
- The Gift of Emptiness (poetry, Kragujevac, 1986)
- Farewell suit (short stories, Belgrade, 1997)
- Hunger (poetry, Kragujevac, 1998),
- Short Stories without Any Trouble (short stories - first edition, Belgrade, 2003)
- America has a hole (drama trilogy, Belgrade, 2003)
- Short Stories without Any Trouble (short stories - second expanded edition, Belgrade, 2006)
- Reservation Serbia (short drama, Belgrade, 2006)
- Gavrilo's Principle (comedy, Belgrade, 2008)
- Do you love me, Jakove (comedy, Belgrade, 2008)
- Here the rabbit drinks water (short satire, Belgrade, 2008)
- A little night mail (e-mail art, Kragujevac, 2009)
- My man (comedy, Belgrade, 2010)
- Hat (short stories, Belgrade, 2018)
- Stories (short stories, Belgrade, 2018)

== CD-ROM ==
- Circus (graphics, books and texts - Kragujevac 2006).
