= Vladana Likar-Smiljanić =

Vladana Likar-Smiljanić (Serbian Cyrillic: Владана Ликар-Смиљанић; born 18 July 1943 in Belgrade) is a Serbian engineer, educator and book illustrator and writer.

In the former Yugoslavia, Likar-Smiljanić illustrated children's books, of which hundreds of thousands of copies were sold. Her books were sold also in Spain, Italy, the United States, Germany, the Soviet Union. She initially became well known for her page "Cica's Corner" in popular Yugoslav magazine for entertainment, Politikin Zabavnik. Her first illustrations appeared in The Treasury of Children's Poems by Jova Jovanović Zmaj.

After her successful debut, Likar-Smiljanić illustrated more than twenty books, that were almost as popular as her first book. She was collecting counting songs for the hide and seek game of many nations, and illustrated those in one of her favorites "Counting Songs". Vladana both wrote and illustrated her last book "Princess Milly" that was devoted to her younger daughter Milče. Milče was a frightened little girl, and the stories of this book were weaved to encourage her to handle whatever situations she would encounter.

Likar-Smiljanić's main profession was teaching and researching at the University of Belgrade Faculty of Electrical Engineering. For her research, she examined the properties of various materials, in particular their complex permeability and permittivity at high frequencies. She published papers in international journals. Vladana is a coauthor of two textbooks in the area of microwave communications.

Likar-Smiljanić's political work during Milošević governance in Serbia is another aspect of her contribution to the society. It was noted by Human Rights Watch, and Helsinki Committee for Human Rights.

She became a director of the computing center at the School of Electrical Engineering of Belgrade University in 2001, that was quite devastated at the time by the anti-university politics during the previous decade.

== Biography ==
Born in Belgrade, her father Dušan, a medical doctor, was talented in arts and helped Vladana's love for arts to develop. She became proficient in drawing, painting and sculpture. She decided to enroll in the electrical engineering program at Belgrade University but continued to draw.

She initially drew cartoons for the students' magazine "Electron". While working for "Electron", Vladana met her husband Mića. After she completed her degree, she became a teaching assistant at the School of Electrical Engineering of Belgrade University and took a break from drawing.

Vladana gave birth to her daughter Aleksandra in 1970, and found new inspiration in illustrating Aleksandra and her friends. She became an illustrator of a well-known magazine for youth Politikin Zabavnik. She worked for the magazine for the next twenty one years. In 1973, the editors of Politikin Zabavnik recommended Vladana to illustrate The Treasury of Children's Poems by Jova Jovanović Zmaj. After this she illustrated more than twenty books for children: Sparrow Rayko, Most Beautiful Fables, Counting Songs, For Your Birthday, Princess Milly, and others. At the same time, she was teaching and researching at the School of Electrical Engineering. She defended her PhD thesis in the area of optical communications.

When Slobodan Milošević came to power and made unreasonable demands, which she refused to support, she was not allowed to enter her school building workplace for two years. She started the correspondence with the list of a thousand alumni around the world (most of whom were her former students), informing them about events during this time period. The correspondence was published in An E-mail has Arrived. Her political engagement was reported by Helsinki Committee for Human Rights, and other non-government organizations. When Milošević was ousted, she returned to the university. In 2001, she became a director of the computing center of the School of Electrical Engineering.

== Illustrated books for children ==
- "The Treasury of Children's Poems" by Jova Jovanović Zmaj
- "Most Beautiful Fables for Children" by Dositej Obradović
- "Counting Songs" by Vladana Likar Smiljanić
- "For Your Birthday" by Snežana Kićović Pejaković
- "Fairytales from a Little Wood" by Snežana Kićović Pejaković
- "Baby was Born" by Snežana Kićović Pejaković
- "The Dragon" Jovan Jovanović Zmaj
- "Guess Songs" Tankosava Petrović
- "Puss in Boots" by Charles Perrault
- "Cindarella" by Brothers Grimm
- "Pinocchio" by Carlo Collodi
- "What's the time?"
- "The Wolf and Seven Young Kids" by Brothers Grimm
- "Three Little Pigs" by James Orchard Halliwell-Phillipps
- "Hansel and Gretel" by Brothers Grimm
- "Little Red Riding Hood" by Brothers Grimm
- "Sparrow Rayko" by Snežana Kićović Pejaković
- "Most Beautiful Fables" by Jean de La Fontaine
- "Princess Milly" by Vladana Likar Smiljanić
