= Vlatko =

- Gender: male
- Language: Serbo-Croatian

Origin
- Origin: South Slavic
- Region of origin: Southeastern Europe

Other names
- Alternative spelling: Serbian Cyrillic: Влатко
- Variant form: Vladko (Владко)
- Related names: female form Vlatka

Vlatko (Cyrillic: Влатко) is a masculine given name of South Slavic origin.

Notable people with the name include:

- Vlatko Andonovski (born 1976), football manager
- Vlatko Blažević (born 1994), Croatian football player
- Vlatko Čančar (born 1997), Slovenian professional basketball player
- Vlatko Đolonga (born 1976), Croatian football defender
- Vlatko Drobarov (born 1992), Macedonian professional footballer
- Vlatko Dulić (1943–2015), Croatian theatre, TV and film actor, theatre director
- Vlatko Glavaš (born 1962), Bosnian football coach and a former player
- Vlatko Gošev (born 1974), retired Macedonian football midfielder
- Vlatko Grozdanoski (born 1983), Macedonian footballer
- Vlatko Hercegović (1428–1489), the second and the last Herzog of Saint Sava
- Vlatko Ilievski (1985–2018), Macedonian pop rock singer and actor
- Vlatko Konjevod (1923–2005), Yugoslav and later Bosnian football manager and player
- Vlatko Kostov (born 1965), former Yugoslav and Macedonian football midfielder
- Vlatko Kovačević (born 1942), Croatian and Yugoslavian grandmaster of chess
- Vlatko Lazić (born 1989), Dutch professional footballer
- Vlatko Lozanoski (born 1985), Macedonian singer
- Vlatko Maček (1879–1964), politician in the Kingdom of Yugoslavia
- Vlatko Marković (1937–2013), football player & manager, president of Croatian Football Federation
- Vlatko Mitkov (born 1981), Macedonian handball player
- Vlatko Nedelkov (born 1985), former Macedonian professional basketball Guard
- Vlatko Novakov (born 1978), retired Macedonian football defender
- Vlatko Paskačić, 14th century Serbian nobleman
- Vlatko Pavletić (1930–2007), Croatian politician and academic
- Vlatko Rajković (born 1959), politician in Serbia
- Vlatko Ratković (born 1965), politician in Serbia
- Vlatko Sokolov (born 1973), Macedonian wrestler
- Vlatko Stefanovski, ethno-rock jazz fusion guitar player from Macedonia
- Vlatko Stojanovski (born 1997), Macedonian professional footballer
- Vlatko Vedral (born 1971), physicist
- Vlatko Vladičevski, Macedonian former professional basketball player
- Vlatko Vuković, Grand Duke of Hum (died 1392), Bosnian medieval noble

== See also ==
- Vlatka
- Vlatković
- Vlatkovići
