= Vladeta Jerotić =

Serbian writer

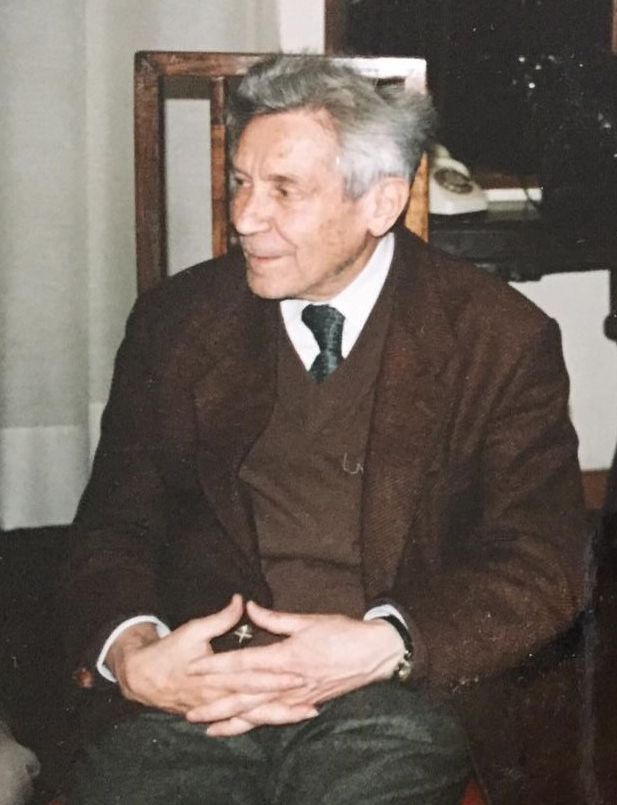
- Born: 2 August 1924; Belgrade, Kingdom of Serbs, Croats and Slovenes
- Died: 4 September 2018 (aged 94); Belgrade, Serbia
- Occupations: Psychiatrist, psychotherapist, philosopher and writer

Vladeta Jerotić (Serbian Cyrillic: Владета Јеротић; 2 August 1924 – 4 September 2018) was a Serbian psychiatrist, psychotherapist, philosopher and writer.

== Biography ==
Vladeta Jerotić grew up as the only child of an official of the Royal Court of Audit (Glavna kontrola) in Zadarska Street of the old Belgrade quarter Kosančićev venac. He attended the primary school and the gymnasium in his native place and graduated with maturity diploma in 1942. The young man could not continue his education at the university, because the academic institution was closed in the years of the German occupation during World War II in Yugoslavia.

In his memoirs, he described his parental home as non-nationalist, non-chauvinist and non-communist, and that no one from his whole family joined Tito’s Partisans or Mihailović's Chetniks. Jerotić remained true to this principle and he never became a member of the Communist Party or any other political organization. In 1945, he began studying at the Medical Faculty and obtained his doctorate as MD in 1951. He specialized in neuropsychiatry and psychotherapy and spent several years for further professional training in Germany, Switzerland and France. During his stay in Bern, the young doctor had written contact with Hermann Hesse in 1959, which is listed and archived in the inventory and the collection of the Swiss Literary Archives. In 1961, he came back to Belgrade and worked at the institute of occupational health. In 1963, he moved to the Dragiša Mišović hospital in Dedinje and became appointed chief of the department for psychiatry in 1971–85.

Since 1985, he lectured for more than a decade on pastoral psychology at the Faculty of Orthodox Theology of the University of Belgrade. In 2000, he was elected as a member of Serbian Academy of Sciences and Arts in the Department of Language and Literature, where he became a corresponding member in 1994. He was honorary president of the Serbian Analytical Society and a member of the International Association of Applied Psychology. Jerotić received the 2003 Isidora Sekulić Award for his autobiography Putovanja, zapisi, sećanja: 1951–2000 (Voyages, Notes, Memories) and the Dositej Obradović Award 2014 for his life achievement. Over and above that, he was honored with numerous other prizes in recognition of his work since 1982.

== Religious views ==
He can be described as a believing Christian of the Serbian Orthodox religion, but he always wisely exerted the principles of respect, tolerance and openness towards other religions, based on the long-term knowledge from his psychological work. Jerotić described the human psyche as divided into three "parallelly and continuously active" layers based on beliefs and traditions from either paganism, the Old Testament or the New Testament.

Jerotić often compared and combined beliefs and teachings from different religions: "A man/woman is spiritually restless when she/he both loves and hates one and the same person (his/her child, spouse) sometimes or for a long while. She/he is unhappy when his/her love remains unrequited, she/he is then capable of turning into hate the love previously felt, unhappy when in fear of the loss of a loved one, deeply sorrowful and restless when the loss actually occurs. On the basis of this truth, the great Indian philosopher Buddha grounded his philosophical teaching incorporating the four truths and the eightfold path to salvation. However, one thing remains clear to the Christian and the psychologist that people shall remain restless as long as they love and hate."

== Death and legacy ==
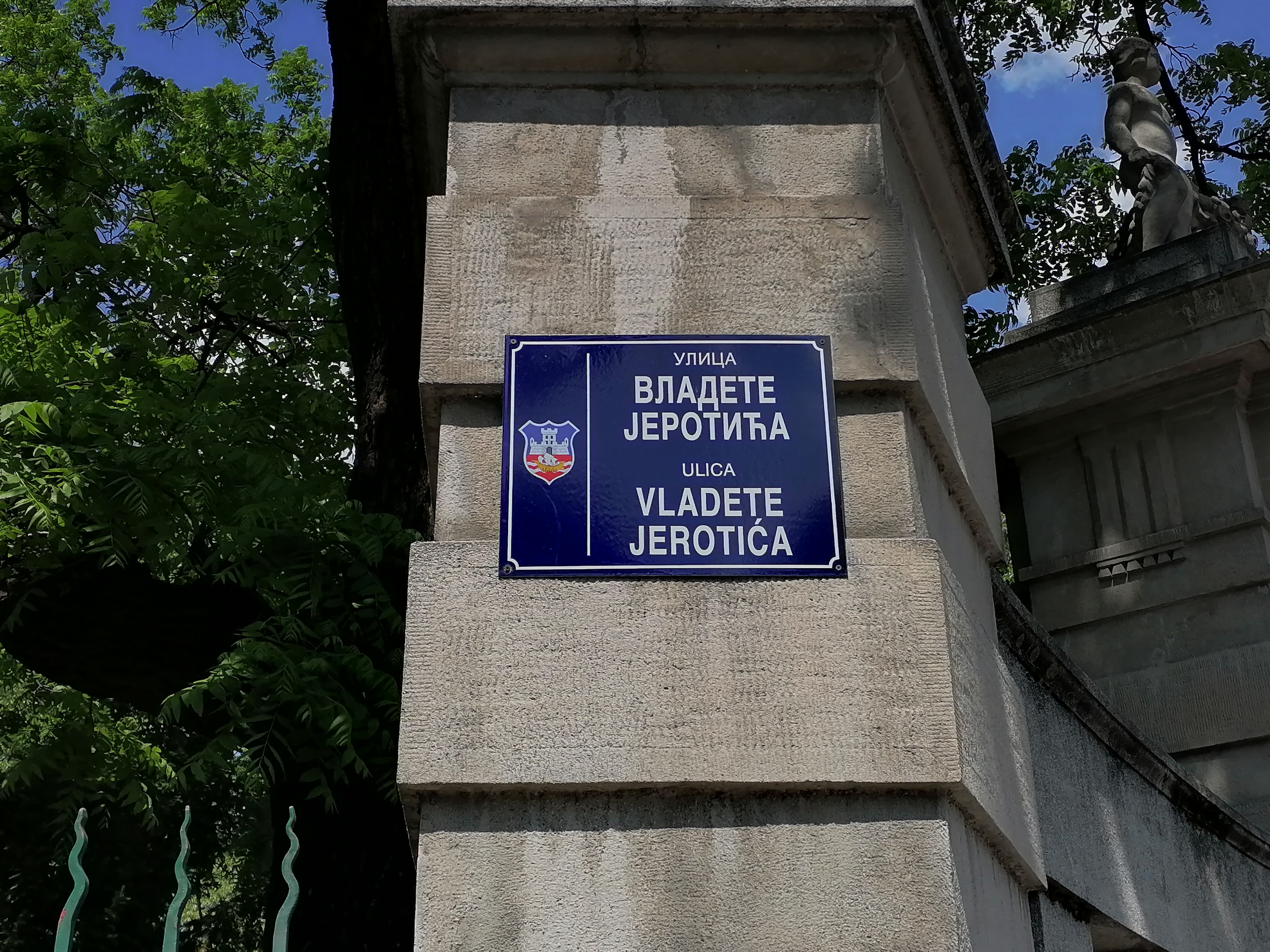
A part of Dalmatinska Street in Belgrade, from Takovska to George Washington, was named after Jerotić in 2021

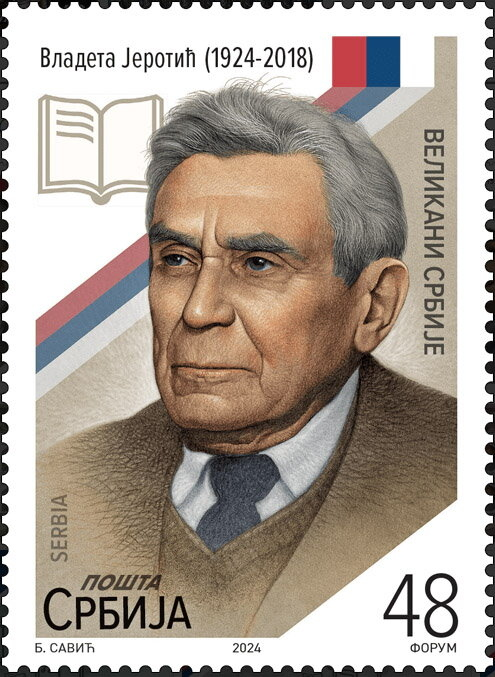
Jerotić on a 2024 stamp of Serbia

Jerotić died on 4 September 2018 in Belgrade at the age of 94 and the numerous obituaries in the Serbian media appreciated his personality, integrity and philanthropy and presented the respect and importance that the Serbian society and its public pay tribute to him. He was buried in the New Cemetery.

In 2007, the Jerotić Foundation (Zadužbina Vladete Jerotića) was established, which manages and preserves the extensive legacy of his lifetime achievement, consisting of more than over 500 publications, including about 200 studies and articles in scientific journals.

== Selected works ==
- Sigmund Frojd: Iz kulture i umetnosti (Sigmund Freud: From Culture and Art; partially translated by Vladeta Jerotić), Matica srpska, Novi Sad 1969.
- Ličnost mladog narkomana (Personality of a young drug addict), Institute for alcoholism and drug addiction, Belgrade 1974.
- Psihoanaliza i kultura (Psychoanalysis and Culture), Beogradski izdavačko-grafički zavod, Belgrade 1974.
- Bolest i stvaranje: patografske studije (Illness and Creation: Phatographic Studies), Beogradski izdavačko-grafički zavod, Belgrade 1976.
- Sigmund Frojd: Autobiografija (Sigmund Freud: Autobiography; partially translated by Vladeta Jerotić), Matica srpska, Novi Sad 1976.
- Između autoriteta i slobode (Between Authority and Freedom), Prosveta, Belgrade 1980.
- Neurotične pojave našeg vremena (Neurotic Phenomena of Our Time), Kolarčev narodni univerzitet, Belgrade 1981.
- Neuroza kao izazov (Neurosis As Challenge), Medicinska knjiga, Belgrade 1984.
- Psihodinamika i psihoterapija neuroza (Psychodynamics and Psychotherapy of Neurosis; with Milan Popović), Nolit, Belgrade 1984.
- Čovek i njegov identitet: psihološki problemi savremenog čoveka (The Human’s Identity: the psychological problems of modern human being), Dečje novine, Gornji Milanovac 1988, ISBN 86-367-0145-7.
- Jung između Istoka i Zapada (Jung between East and West), Prosveta, Belgrade 1990, ISBN 86-07-00472-7.
- Mistička stanja, vizije i bolesti (Mystical Conditions, Visions and Illnesses), Dečje novine, Gornji Milanovac 1991,ISBN 86-367-0542-8.
- Putovanje u oba smera (Trip In Both Directions), Plato, Belgrade 1992, ISBN 86-447-0005-7.
- Samo dela ljubavi ostaju (Just the Work of Love Remains; preface by monk Mitrophan of Hilandar), Novi dani, Belgrade 1994.
- Putovanja, zapisi, sećanja: 1951-2000 (Voyages, Notes, Memories), Srpska književna zadruga, Belgrade 2003, ISBN 86-379-0815-2.
- 50 pitanja i 50 odgovora: iz hrišćansko-psihoterapeutske prakse (50 questions and 50 answers: from Christian psychotherapeutic practice), Ars Libri, Belgrade 2003, ISBN 86-7588-014-6.
- Psihoterapija i religija (Psychotherapy and Religion), Ars Libri, Belgrade 2006, ISBN 86-7588-081-2.
- Jung entre l'Orient et l'Occident, Éditions L'Âge d'Homme, Lausanne 2012, ISBN 978-2-8251-4200-4.

== Awards ==
- Zahvalnica Matice srpske 1982 (Matica srpska Letter of Gratitude)
- Povelja bolnice "Dr Dragiša Mišović“ 1983 (Charter of Honor of "Dr Dragiša Mišović“ Hospital)
- Povelja Srpskog lekarskog društva 1993 (Charter of Honor of Serbian Medical Society)
- Đorđe Jovanović Award 1994
- Laza Kostić Award 1997
- Order of St. Sava (First Grade) 2001
- Isidora Sekulić Award 2003
- Dositej Obradović Award 2014
- Teodor Pavlović Award 2015
- Velika povelja Brankovog kola 2017 (Grand Charter of Honor of Branko's Circle)
- Feast of the Presentation Order, posthumously awarded, 2019
