= 2008 UEFA European Under-19 Championship qualification =

UEFA U-19 Championship 2008 (qualifying round) was the first round of qualifications for the final tournament of 2008 UEFA European Under-19 Championship. 52 teams were split into 13 groups of 4 and teams in each group played each other once. The top two teams in each group and the two best third-placed teams will enter UEFA U-19 Championship 2008 (Elite Round).

== Group 1 ==
Team	Pld	W	D	L	GF	GA	GD	Pts
Portugal (H)	3	3	0	0	5	2	+3	9
Belarus	3	2	0	1	8	3	+5	6
Republic of Ireland	3	1	0	2	4	4	0	3
Andorra	3	0	0	3	1	9	−8	0

(H) Hosts
2007-11-01

Republic of Ireland	0 – 2	Belarus
	Report	Radevich 37'; Vitus 82'

Estádio do Varzim Sport Club, Póvoa de Varzim
Referee: Dejan Filipović (Serbia)

2007-11-01

Portugal	1 – 0	Andorra
Romeu Ribeiro 73'	Report

Estádio do Clube Desportivo Trofense, Trofa
Referee: Ante Vučemilović-Šimunović Jr. (Croatia)

2007-11-03

Republic of Ireland	3 – 0	Andorra
Carey 24' (pen.); Hutton 72'; Daly 81'	Report

Estádio do Rio Ave FC, Vila do Conde
Referee: Ante Vučemilović-Šimunović Jr. (Croatia)

2007-11-03

Belarus	1 – 2	Portugal
Yuzvovich 8'	Report	Coelho Lopes 43'; Miguel Vítor 85'

Estádio Municipal Dr. José Vieira de Carvalho, Maia
Referee: Fredy Fautrel (France)

2007-11-06

Portugal	2 – 1	Republic of Ireland
Adrien Silva 13'; Carvalhas 21'	Report	Mcdermott 40'

Estádio do Varzim Sport Club, Póvoa de Varzim
Referee: Fredy Fautrel (France)

2007-11-06

Andorra	1 – 5	Belarus
Valls 4'	Report	Varankow 10' (pen.), 18'; Matsveenka 22'; Yuzvovich 45'; Orosa 57' (o.g.)

Padroense FC, Padrao Légua
Referee: Dejan Filipović (Serbia)

== Group 2 ==
Team	Pld	W	D	L	GF	GA	GD	Pts
Hungary (H)	3	3	0	0	11	2	+9	9
Switzerland	3	1	1	1	8	4	+4	4
Kazakhstan	3	1	0	2	3	13	−10	3
Wales	3	0	1	2	3	6	−3	1

(H) Hosts
2007-10-08

Switzerland	1 – 1	Wales
Gavranovic 47'		87' I. Jones

Városi Stadion, Tatabánya
Referee: Bjorn Kuipers (Netherlands)

2007-10-08

Hungary	6 – 0	Kazakhstan
Birtalan 22', 24'; Dudás 28'; Nagy 77'; Busai 79'; Nikházi 86'

Stadion Sóstói, Székesfehérvár
Referee: Cristina Dorcioman (Romania)

2007-10-10

Switzerland	6 – 1	Kazakhstan
Schürpf 4', 43'; Unal 27', 67'; Gavranovic 53', 63'		Serdyukov 59'

Városi Stadion, Tatabánya
Referee: Marcin Borski (Poland)

2007-10-10

Wales	1 – 3	Hungary
Partington 45'		3' Busai; 63', 76' Németh

Stadion Sóstói, Székesfehérvár
Referee: Bjorn Kuipers (Netherlands)

2007-10-13

Hungary	2 – 1	Switzerland
Nikházi 86'; Koman 85'		8' Frei

Városi Stadion, Tatabánya
Referee: Marcin Borski (Poland)

2007-10-13

Kazakhstan	2 – 1	Wales
Goloveshkin 47'; Zabrodin 67'		57' C.Jones

Stadion Sóstói, Székesfehérvár
Referee: Cristina Dorcioman (Romania)

== Group 3 ==
Team	Pld	W	D	L	GF	GA	GD	Pts
England (H)	3	3	0	0	14	2	+12	9
Iceland	3	2	0	1	6	6	0	6
Belgium	3	1	0	2	6	6	0	3
Romania	3	0	0	3	0	12	−12	0

(H) Hosts
2007-10-12

Belgium	4 – 0	Romania
Wuytens 6'; De Pauw 63', 75'; Vansimpsen 90'

Bootham Crescent, York
Referee: Aydınus (Turkey)

2007-10-12

England	5 – 1	Iceland
Brandy 46'; Carroll 58'; Henry 62'; Pearce 72'; Sinclair 77'		52' A. E. Gunnarsson

Keepmoat Stadium, Doncaster
Referee: Jilek (Czech Republic)

2007-10-14

Romania	0 – 6	England
		3' Clark; 31', 70', 86' Obadeyi; 39' Chandler; 52' Brandy

Glanford Park, Scunthorpe
Referee: Muñiz Fernández (Spain)

2007-10-14

Belgium	1 – 3	Iceland
De Pauw 14'		1' G. T. Sigurdsson; 11' K. Jónsson; 79' Jósefsson

Spotland Stadium, Rochdale
Referee: Jilek (Czech Republic)

2007-10-17

England	3 – 1	Belgium
Obadeyi 30'; Henry 71'; Pearce 78'		76' Odjidja-Ofoe

Glanford Park, Scunthorpe
Referee: Muñiz Fernández (Spain)

2007-10-17

Iceland	2 – 0	Romania
Jósefsson 13'; G. T. Sigurdsson 73'

Keepmoat Stadium, Doncaster
Referee: Aydınus (Turkey)

== Group 4 ==
Team	Pld	W	D	L	GF	GA	GD	Pts
France	3	2	1	0	9	2	+7	7
Greece	3	2	1	0	8	3	+5	7
Slovenia	3	1	0	2	3	3	0	3
Luxembourg (H)	3	0	0	3	1	13	−12	0

(H) Hosts
2007-10-26

Slovenia	3 – 0	Luxembourg
Kokol 7'; Cabrillon 39' (o.g); Omladič 90'

Stade rue Henri Dunant, Beggen
Referee: Kever (Switzerland)

2007-10-26

France	2 – 2	Greece
Schneiderlin 5'; Ngog 74'		24' Matsoukas; 86' (pen.) Pavlis

Stade John Grün, Mondorf-les-Bains
Referee: Moen (Norway)

2007-10-28

Slovenia	0 – 1	Greece
		70' Barboudis

Stade rue Henri Dunant, Beggen
Referee: Kever (Switzerland)

2007-10-28

Luxembourg	0 – 5	France
		27' (pen.) Schneiderlin; 30' Poujol; 32' Ngog; 41' Andreu; 59' Dedola

Stade de la Frontière, Esch-sur-Alzette
Referee: Todorov (Bulgaria)

2007-10-31

France	2 – 0	Slovenia
Bakar 86'; Ngog 88'

Stade de la Frontière, Esch-sur-Alzette
Referee: Moen (Norway)

2007-10-31

Greece	5 – 1	Luxembourg
Pavlis 6', 47', 80'; Matsoukas 54'; Boutzikos 66'		44' Leite

Stade John Grün, Mondorf-les-Bains
Referee: Todorov (Bulgaria)

== Group 5 ==
Team	Pld	W	D	L	GF	GA	GD	Pts
Spain (H)	3	1	2	0	3	1	+2	5
Albania	3	1	1	1	2	3	−1	4
Serbia	3	1	1	1	5	3	+2	4
Liechtenstein	3	0	2	1	0	3	−3	2

(H) Hosts
2007-10-18

Serbia	3 – 0	Liechtenstein
Ma. Nikolić 17'; Milenović 59'; Milojević 68'

La Forana, Alginet
Referee: Hinriksson (Iceland)

2007-10-18

Spain	2 – 0	Albania
Nsue 23'; Juan Hernández 53'

La Forana, Alginet
Referee: Chapron (France)

2007-10-20

Albania	2 – 1	Serbia
Bushati 2', 6'		72' Kojic

Luis Suñer Picó, Alzira
Referee: Collum (Scotland)

2007-10-20

Spain	0 – 0	Liechtenstein

Luis Suñer Picó, Alzira
Referee: Hinriksson (Iceland)

2007-10-23

Serbia	1 – 1	Spain
Vuković 10'		58' Aarón

El Collao, Alcoy
Referee: Chapron (France)

2007-10-23

Liechtenstein	0 – 0	Albania

La Forana, Alginet
Referee: Collum (Scotland)

== Group 6 ==
Team	Pld	W	D	L	GF	GA	GD	Pts
Israel	3	3	0	0	5	0	+5	9
Sweden (H)	3	2	0	1	5	2	+3	6
Finland	3	1	0	2	3	3	0	3
Macedonia	3	0	0	3	1	9	−8	0

(H) Hosts
2007-10-12

Israel	3 – 0	Macedonia
Kapiloto 10'; Ron 14'; Asher 90+1'

Svartavallen, Boxholm
Referee: Kulbakov (Belarus)

2007-10-12

Sweden	2 – 0	Finland
P. Johansson 45+1'; Fagerberg 64'

Motala Idrottspark, Motala
Referee: Gräfe (Germany)

2007-10-14

Sweden	3 – 1	Macedonia
Salomonsson 12'; Fagerberg 23'; Landgren 45'		31' Ivanovski

Svartavallen, Boxholm
Referee: McKeon (Republic of Ireland)

2007-10-14

Finland	0 – 1	Israel
		80' Ron

Vifolkavallen, Mjölby
Referee: Kulbakov (Belarus)

2007-10-17

Israel	1 – 0	Sweden
Asher 90+3'

Vifolkavallen, Mjölby
Referee: Gräfe (Germany)

2007-10-17

Macedonia	0 – 3	Finland
		38' (o.g.) Petrov; 76' Mattila; 90+3' Sumusalo

Motala Idrottspark, Motala
Referee: McKeon (Republic of Ireland)

== Group 7 ==
Team	Pld	W	D	L	GF	GA	GD	Pts
Lithuania (H)	3	1	2	0	7	3	+4	5
Armenia	3	1	2	0	3	2	+1	5
Poland	3	1	2	0	6	1	+5	5
San Marino	3	0	0	3	0	10	−10	0

(H) Hosts
2007-10-20

Poland	5 – 0	San Marino
Wysocki 17'; Colonna 31' (o.g.); Kursa 59'; Kupisz 80'; Łuczak 86'

Sūduva stadium, Marijampolė
Referee: Georgiev (Bulgaria)

2007-10-20

Armenia	2 – 2	Lithuania
Mkhitaryan 20'; Gyozalyan 74'		57', 65' Novikovas

S. Darius and S. Girėnas Stadium, Kaunas
Referee: Whitby (Wales)

2007-10-22

Armenia	1 – 0	San Marino
Chilingaryan 45+2'

Sūduva stadium, Marijampolė
Referee: Whitby (Wales)

2007-10-22

Lithuania	1 – 1	Poland
Eliosius 90+1'		90+3' Krychowiak

S. Darius and S. Girėnas Stadium, Kaunas
Referee: Schörgenhofer (Austria)

2007-10-25

Poland	0 – 0	Armenia

Sūduva stadium, Marijampolė
Referee: Schörgenhofer (Austria)

2007-10-25

San Marino	0 – 4	Lithuania
		26', 61' Eliosius; 59' Skrockas; 77' (pen.) Novikovas

S. Darius and S. Girėnas Stadium, Kaunas
Referee: Georgiev (Bulgaria)

== Group 8 ==
Team	Pld	W	D	L	GF	GA	GD	Pts
Norway	3	3	0	0	6	1	+5	9
Netherlands	3	2	0	1	5	4	+1	6
Latvia	3	1	0	2	2	4	−2	3
Georgia (H)	3	0	0	3	1	5	−4	0

(H) Hosts
2007-10-18

Norway	2 – 0	Latvia
Khalili 18'; Flo 34' (pen.)

Poladi Stadium, Rustavi
Referee: Mikołajewski (Poland)

2007-10-18

Netherlands	2 – 1	Georgia
de Jong 83'; Hootkoop 86'		12' Targamadze

Mikheil Meskhi Stadium, Tbilisi
Referee: Vad (Hungary)

2007-10-20

Netherlands	2 – 0	Latvia
Wijnaldum 22'; Matić 84' (pen.)

Tamaz Stephania Stadium, Bolnisi
Referee: Vad (Hungary)

2007-10-20

Georgia	0 – 1	Norway
		49' Kind Bendiksen

Mikheil Meskhi Stadium, Tbilisi
Referee: Stavrev (Macedonia)

2007-10-23

Norway	3 – 1	Netherlands
Khalili 15'; Flo 31' (pen.); Aas 51'		11' de Jong

Poladi Stadium, Rustavi
Referee: Mikołajewski (Poland)

2007-10-23

Latvia	2 – 0	Georgia
Siņeļņikovs 55'; Kalnins 75'

Mikheil Meskhi Stadium, Tbilisi
Referee: Stavrev (Macedonia)

== Group 9 ==
Team	Pld	W	D	L	GF	GA	GD	Pts
Turkey	3	2	1	0	5	1	+4	7
Bulgaria (H)	3	1	1	1	1	2	−1	4
Denmark	3	1	1	1	2	1	+1	4
Faroe Islands	3	0	1	2	1	5	−4	1

(H) Hosts
2007-10-10

Turkey	3 – 1	Faroe Islands
Firat 15'; Kiraz 29'; Yildirim 76'		7' Holm

Gradski Stadion Nessebar, Nesebar
Referee: Nikolaev (Russia)

2007-10-10

Denmark	0 – 1	Bulgaria
		71' Aleksandrov

Naftex Stadium, Burgas
Referee: Wouters (Belgium)

2007-10-12

Faroe Islands	0 – 2	Denmark
		7' Povlsen; 88' Kjær

Gradski Stadion Nessebar, Nesebar
Referee: Wouters (Belgium)

2007-10-12

Turkey	2 – 0	Bulgaria
Kurt 3'; Yildirim 12'

Naftex Stadium, Burgas
Referee: Strahonja (Croatia)

2007-10-15

Denmark	0 – 0	Turkey

Gradski Stadion Nessebar, Nesebar
Referee: Strahonja (Croatia)

2007-10-15

Bulgaria	0 – 0	Faroe Islands

Naftex Stadium, Burgas
Referee: Nikolaev (Russia)

== Group 10 ==
Team	Pld	W	D	L	GF	GA	GD	Pts
Slovakia	3	3	0	0	9	2	+7	9
Cyprus (H)	3	1	1	1	4	7	−3	4
Austria	3	1	0	2	2	4	−2	3
Northern Ireland	3	0	1	2	2	4	−2	1

(H) Hosts
2007-10-30

Austria	1 – 0	Northern Ireland
Burgstaller 90+2'

Pafiako Stadium, Paphos
Referee: Blom (Netherlands)

2007-10-30

Slovakia	5 – 1	Cyprus
Ujcik 11', 17', 70'; Stoch 64', 85' (pen.)		28' Xenofontos

Municipal Stadium, Geroskipou
Referee: De Marco (Italy)

2007-11-01

Austria	1 – 2	Cyprus
Pranter 72'		86' (pen.), 90+1' (pen.) Efrem

Pafiako Stadium, Paphos
Referee: Banari (Moldova)

2007-11-01

Northern Ireland	1 – 2	Slovakia
Frizzel 87'		29' (pen.) Stoch; 79' Kubik

Peyia Municipa, Paphos
Referee: Blom (Netherlands)

2007-11-04

Slovakia	2 – 0	Austria
Stoch 51'; Boszorád 90+3'

Municipal Stadium, Geroskipou
Referee: De Marco (Italy)

2007-11-04

Cyprus	1 – 1	Northern Ireland
Pantos 77'		14' Little

Peyia Municipa, Paphos
Referee: Banari (Moldova)

== Group 11 ==
Team	Pld	W	D	L	GF	GA	GD	Pts
Ukraine	3	3	0	0	6	1	+5	9
Moldova (H)	3	1	1	1	2	2	0	4
Azerbaijan	3	1	1	1	2	3	−1	4
Scotland	3	0	0	3	0	4	−4	0

(H) Hosts
2007-10-26

Scotland	0 – 1	Moldova
	Report	87' Andronic

Zimbru Stadium, Chişinău
Referee: Stalhammar (Sweden)

2007-10-26

Ukraine	3 – 0	Azerbaijan
Kravets 20'; Kovalyov 40'; Politylo 59'	Report

District Sport Complex, Orhei
Referee: Skomina (Slovenia)

2007-10-28

Ukraine	2 – 1	Moldova
Kovalyov 52'; Zozulya 64'	Report	82' Andronic

Zimbru Stadium, Chişinău
Referee: Sipailo (Latvia)

2007-10-28

Azerbaijan	2 – 0	Scotland
Soltanov 48', 67'	Report

District Sport Complex, Orhei
Referee: Skomina (Slovenia)

2007-10-31

Scotland	0 – 1	Ukraine
	Report	87' Shakhov

District Sport Complex, Orhei
Referee: Stalhammar (Sweden)

2007-10-31

Moldova	0 – 0	Azerbaijan
	Report

Zimbru Stadium, Chişinău
Referee: Sipailo (Latvia)

== Group 12 ==
Team	Pld	W	D	L	GF	GA	GD	Pts
Russia (H)	3	3	0	0	11	2	+9	9
Germany	3	2	0	1	15	5	+10	6
Bosnia and Herzegovina	3	0	1	2	3	11	−8	1
Estonia	3	0	1	2	3	14	−11	1

(H) Hosts
2007-09-24

Germany	8 – 1	Bosnia and Herzegovina
Naki 10'; Gebhart 43' (pen.); Choupo-Moting 60'; Vrančić 61'; Diekmeier 63', 76'; Fischer 71', 73'		85' Vidović

Krylia Sovetov Stadium, Moscow
Referee: Kari (Finland)

2007-09-24

Russia	7 – 0	Estonia
Ionov 9'; Prudnikov 29', 39', 49'; Ryzhov 45'; Gorbatenko 81'; Alborov 88'

Spartak Stadium, Schelkovo
Referee: Yıldırım (Turkey)

2007-09-26

Germany	5 – 1	Estonia
Naki 10', 74'; Choupo-Moting 33'; Gebhart 47' (pen.); Morozov 64' (o.g.)		90' Tšurilkin

Spartak Stadium, Schelkovo
Referee: Kari (Finland)

2007-09-26

Bosnia and Herzegovina	0 – 1	Russia
		44' Fomin

Moskvich Stadium, Moscow
Referee: Olsiak (Slovakia)

2007-09-29

Russia	3 – 2	Germany
Fomin 24'; Gorbatenko 34'; Gagloev 69'		13' Choupo-Moting; 27' Naki

Krylia Sovetov Stadium, Moscow
Referee: Olsiak (Slovakia)

2007-09-29

Estonia	2 – 2	Bosnia and Herzegovina
Jegorov 64'; Morozov 90'		61' Vidović; 80' Galesic

Moskvich Stadium, Moscow
Referee: Yıldırım (Turkey)

== Group 13 ==
Team	Pld	W	D	L	GF	GA	GD	Pts
Italy (H)	3	3	0	0	8	2	+6	9
Croatia	3	2	0	1	6	4	+2	6
Montenegro	3	1	0	2	5	5	0	3
Malta	3	0	0	3	0	8	−8	0

(H) Hosts
2007-11-10

Croatia	3 – 0	Malta
Krizman 13', 81'; Bodul 74'

Comunale, Jesi
Referee: Guliyev (Azerbaijan)

2007-11-10

Italy	3 – 1	Montenegro
Viola 18' (pen.); Raggio Garibaldi 47'; Poli 77'	Report	57' Jovetić

Comunale, Castelfidardo
Referee: Jorge Sousa (Portugal)

2007-11-12

Croatia	2 – 1	Montenegro
Krizman 86'; Antunovic 90+3'		31' Bogdanović

Comunale, Castelfidardo
Referee: Rubinos Perez (Spain)

2007-11-12

Malta	0 – 2	Italy
		17' Morbidelli; 28' (pen.)Okaka Chuka

Comunale, Jesi
Referee: Sousa (Portugal)

2007-11-15

Italy	3 – 1	Croatia
Viola 3'; Mazzarani 11'; Eusepi 20'		56' (pen.) Bagaric

Comunale, Castelfidardo
Referee: Rubinos Perez (Spain)

2007-11-15

Montenegro	3 – 0	Malta
Becirovic 5'; Novovic 69', 85'

Comunale, Jesi
Referee: Guliyev (Azerbaijan)

== Best third-placed teams ==
Grp	Team	Pld	W	D	L	GF	GA	GD	Pts
7	Poland	3	1	2	0	6	1	+5	5
5	Serbia	3	1	1	1	5	3	+2	4
9	Denmark	3	1	1	1	2	1	+1	4
11	Azerbaijan	3	1	1	1	2	3	−1	4
3	Belgium	3	1	0	2	6	6	0	3
13	Montenegro	3	1	0	2	5	5	0	3
1	Republic of Ireland	3	1	0	2	4	4	0	3
6	Finland	3	1	0	2	3	3	0	3
4	Slovenia	3	1	0	2	3	3	0	3
10	Austria	3	1	0	2	2	4	−2	3
8	Latvia	3	1	0	2	2	4	−2	3
2	Kazakhstan	3	1	0	2	3	13	−10	3
12	Bosnia and Herzegovina	3	0	1	2	3	11	−8	1

== See also ==
- 2008 UEFA European Under-19 Championship
- 2008 UEFA European Under-19 Championship elite qualification
