= Radovan =

- Pronunciation: Czech: [ˈradovan] Serbo-Croatian: [râdoʋaːn]
- Gender: Male

Origin
- Origin: Slavic
- Meaning: The joyful one

Radovan (Serbian Cyrillic: Радован) is a Slavic male given name, derived from the passive adjective radovati ("rejoice"), itself from root rad- meaning "care, joy". It is found in Serbia, North Macedonia, Bosnia and Herzegovina, Croatia, Montenegro, Czech Republic, Slovakia, Russia, Ukraine, and Bulgaria. It has been recorded in Serbia since the High Middle Ages.

Male variations and diminutives (and nicknames) include Radovanče, Radan, Radánek, Rade, Rado, Radič, Radko, Radvan, Radúz, Radek, and cognates Radomir, Radomil and Radoslav. Female forms include Radka, Radana, Radomirka, Radmila, Radica.

Namedays include 13 January in Croatia, and 14 January in Slovakia and Czech Republic.

== Notable people ==
- Radovan (master), 13th-century Croatian sculptor and architect
- Radovan Jelašić, Serbian economist
- Radovan Jovićević, Serbian composer, producer and musician
- Radovan Karadžić, Bosnian Serb politician and convicted war criminal
- Radovan Krejčíř, Czech organized crime boss and convicted criminal
- Radovan Lukavský, Czech actor and theatrical pedagogue
- Radovan Sloboda (ice hockey), Slovak ice hockey player
- Radovan Sloboda (politician), Slovak politician and sports administrator
- Radovan Vujović, Serbian actor
- Radovan Zogović, Montenegrin poet

== Fictional characters ==
- Prince Radovan, character in the Czech fairy-tale Princezna se zlatou hvězdou
- Radovan, the main hero of the Czech TV-serial (Večerníček) Radovanovy radovánky

== See also ==
- all pages named Radovan
- Radovanović

== Sources ==
- Grković, Milica (1977). Rečnik ličnih imena kod Srba. Belgrade: Vuk Karadžić.
