= Radomir (given name) =

- Pronunciation: Serbo-Croatian: [râdomiːr] Czech: [ˈradomiːr]
- Gender: male

Origin
- Origin: Slavic
- Meaning: rad ("care, joy") + mir ("famous, peace" or "world")

Other names
- Variant forms: Radomír, Radimir, Ratomir, Radomyr, Radomira (f)
- Nicknames: Radek, Radko, Mirek, Mirko, Rada (f), Radka (f), Mirka (f)
- Related names: Radosław, Radoslav

Radomir (Cyrillic: Радомир) is a Slavic masculine given name. The etymology of the original form of the name, Radomer, is from rat (old Slavonic for "war"), and mer ("merit, ability"), i.e. "able warrior". However, modern popular understanding in most Slavic languages would link the name to rad ("happy, willing") and mir ("peace, world, fame").

The name Radomir is popular in Bulgaria and Serbia. It is also used in the Czech language, with the spelling Radomír.

The feminine form of the name is Radomira or Radomíra. Nicknames for the name include Radek, Radko, Mirek, Mirko, Rado, Racho, Rada (f), Radka (f), Mirka (f). A nickname derived from Radomir is Rasha.

== Notable people with the name ==
- Gavril Radomir of Bulgaria, medieval tsar
- Radomir Antić (1948–2020), Serbian football player and manager
- Radomir Belaćević (1929–2005), Serbian film director and actor
- Radomír Blažík (born 1954), Czechoslovak sprint canoeist
- Radomír Chýlek (born 1967), Czech footballer
- Radomir Đalović (born 1982), Montenegrin football player
- Radomir Damnjanović Damnjan (1935–2025), Serbian-Italian painter and conceptual artist
- Radomir Đorđević (born 1940), professor of philosophy at the University of Belgrade
- Radomir Drašović (born 1997), Serbian water polo player
- Radomír Heizer (born 1987), Slovak ice hockey player
- Radomir Koković (born 1984), Serbian footballer
- Radomír Kolář (1924–1993), Czech painter and graphic artist
- Radomir Konstantinović (1928−2011), Serbian writer and philosopher
- Radomir Kovačević (1954–2006), Serbian Olympic judoka and coach
- Radomir Kuzmanović (born 1963), Serbian politician
- Radomir Lazović (born 1980), Serbian politician and activist
- Radomir Lukić (1914–1999), Serbian jurist and scholar of philosophy
- Radomir Marković (1921–2010), Serbian actor
- Radomir Marković (born 1946), Serbian intelligence officer
- Radomir Mihailović (born 1950), Serbian rock guitarist, also known as Točak
- Radomir Milosavljević (born 1992), Serbian footballer
- Radomir Naumov (1946–2015) Serbian politician and engineer
- Radomir Nikolić (born 1976), Serbian politician
- Radomir Novaković (born 2000), German–Serbian footballer
- Radomir Opačić (born 1997), Serbian kickboxer
- Radomir Pavitchevitch (1908–2005), French legionnaire, veteran of World War II
- Radomir Petković (born 1986), Serbian professional wrestler
- Radomir Putnik (1847–1917), Serbian Field Marshal (vojvoda) and Chief of General Staff in the Balkan Wars and World War I
- Radomir Radović (1951–1984), Yugoslav civil engineering technician and trade unionist
- Radomir Radulović (born 1960), Serbian footballer
- Radomir Reljić (1938–2006), Serbian painter
- Radomir Samardžić (born 1978), Serbian taekwondo athlete
- Radomir Šaper (1925–1998), Serbian professor
- Radomir Savić (born 1956), Bosnian footballer
- Radomír Šimůnek (disambiguation) Sr. and Jr., father and son Czech cyclo-cross cyclists
- Radomir Šušnjar (born 1955), Bosnian Serb convicted war criminal
- Radomir Todorov (born 1980), Bulgarian footballer
- Radomír Vašek (born 1972), Czech tennis player
- Radomir Vukčević (1941–2014), Yugoslav footballer

== See also ==
- Radomir (disambiguation)
- Radimir Čačić, Croatian politician
- Ratomir Dujković (born 1946), Serbian football player and manager
- Radomira "Radka" Zrubáková (born 1970), Slovak tennis player
