= Radoslav =

Slavic masculine given name

- Pronunciation: Czech: [ˈradoslaf] Slovak: [ˈradɔsɫau̯] Serbo-Croatian: [râdoslaʋ]
- Gender: masculine

Origin
- Language: Slavic
- Meaning: "eager glory"
- Region of origin: Slavic Europe

Other names
- Short forms: Radan, Radek, Radič
- Derived: rad- ("happy, eager, to care") and slava ("glory, fame")
- Related names: Radoslava (f), Radosław, Radosav, Radič, Radu

Radoslav (Cyrillic: Радослав) is a common Slavic masculine given name, derived from rad- ("happy, eager, to care") and slava ("glory, fame"), both very common in Slavic dithematic names. It roughly means "eager glory". It is known since the Middle Ages. The earliest known Radoslav was a 9th-century Serbian ruler.

The feminine form of the name is Radoslava.

== Notable people with the name ==
=== Royalty and nobility ===
- Radoslav of Serbia, Prince of Serbia (r. 800–822)
- Radoslav of Duklja, Prince of Duklja (r. 1146–48)
- Radoslav, Lord of Hum (fl. 12th century)
- Stefan Radoslav (c. 1192 – c. 1234), king of Serbia from 1228 to 1233
- Radoslav Babonić (fl. 1264–95), Croatian–Hungarian magnate
- Radoslav Hlapen (fl. 1350–71), Serbian magnate
- Radoslav, 13th–14th-century Bulgarian sebastokrator
- Radoslav Pavlović Radinović (died 1441), Bosnian nobleman
- Radoslav Čelnik, 16th-century duke (voivode) of Srem

=== Other ===
- Radoslav (painter), Serbian 15th-century painter
- Radoslav Anev (born 1985), Bulgarian footballer
- Radoslav Antl (born 1978), Slovak handball player
- Radoslav Apostolov (born 1997), Bulgarian footballer
- Radoslav Augustín (born 1987), Slovak footballer
- Radoslav Bachev (born 1981), Bulgarian footballer
- Radoslav Batak (born 1977), Montenegrin footballer
- Radoslav Bečejac (born 1941), Yugoslav footballer
- Radoslav Boychev (born 1981), Bulgarian politician
- Radoslav Bratić (1948–2016), Serbian writer, playwright and editor
- Radoslav Brzobohatý (1932–2012), Czech actor
- Radoslav Brđanin (1948–2022), Serbian war criminal
- Radoslav Ciprys (born 1987), Slovak footballer
- Radoslav Cokić (born 1958), Serbian politician
- Radoslav Dimitrov (born 1988), Bulgarian footballer
- Radoslav Ďuriš (born 1974), Slovak wheelchair curler
- Radoslav Filipović (born 19 August 1997), Serbian water polo player
- Radoslav Glavaš (junior) (1909–1945), Herzegovinian Croat Franciscan and fascist collaborator
- Radoslav Glavaš (senior) (1867–1913), Herzegovinian Croat Franciscan
- Radoslav Gondoľ (born 1991), Slovak footballer
- Radoslav Harman, Slovak mathematician
- Radoslav Hecl (born 1974), Slovak ice hockey player
- Radoslav Holúbek (born 1975), Slovak hurdler
- Radoslav Iliev (born 2000), Bulgarian footballer
- Radoslav Illo (born 1990), Slovak ice hockey player
- Radoslav Kasabov (born 1938), Bulgarian wrestler
- Radoslav Katičić (1930–2019), Croatian linguist, historian and culturologist
- Radoslav Kirilov (born 1992), Bulgarian footballer
- Radoslav Komitov (born 1977), Bulgarian footballer
- Radoslav Konstantinov (born 1983), Bulgarian cyclist
- Radoslav Kováč (born 1979), Czech footballer and manager
- Radoslav Kratina (1928–1999), Czech designer, photographer
- Radoslav Kropáč (born 1975), Slovak ice hockey player
- Radoslav Kráľ (born 1974), Slovak footballer
- Radoslav Kunzo (1974–2023), Slovak footballer
- Radoslav Kvapil (born 1934), Czech pianist and composer
- Radoslav Lopašić (1830–1893), Croatian historian
- Radoslav Lorković (born 1958), Croatian born musician
- Radoslav Lukaev (born 1982), Bulgarian tennis player
- Radoslav Látal (born 1970), Czech footballer
- Radoslav Malenovský (born 1986), Slovak sport shooter
- Radoslav Marjanović (born 1989), Serbian politician
- Radoslav Mihaljević (fl. 1426–1436), Serbian magnate
- Radoslav Milenković (born 1958), Serbian actor and theatre director
- Radoslav Milojičić (born 1984), Serbian politician
- Radoslav Mitrevski (born 1981), Bulgarian footballer
- Radoslav Momirski (1919–2007), Yugoslav football manager
- Radoslav Nenadál (1929–2018), Czech writer and translator
- Radoslav "Rasho" Nesterović (born 1976), Slovenian basketball player
- Radoslav Novaković (born 1978), Serbian rugby league player
- Radoslav Pantaleev (born1993), Bulgarian boxer
- Radoslav Pavlović (born 1954), Serbian writer
- Radoslav Peković (born 1994), Serbian basketball player
- Radoslav Procházka (born 1972), Slovak lawyer and former politician
- Radoslav Radev (born 1960), Bulgarian diver
- Radoslav Radić (1890–1946), Bosnian Serb Chetnik commander
- Radoslav Radulović (born 1972), Bosnian footballer
- Radoslav Rangelov (born 1985), Bulgarian footballer
- Radoslav Rančík (born 1979), Slovak basketball player
- Radoslav Rashkov (born 1987), Bulgarian footballer
- Radoslav Rochallyi (born 1980), Slovak writer
- Radoslav Rogina (born 1979), Croatian road bicycle racer
- Radoslav Rosenov, Bulgarian boxer
- Radoslav Samardžić (born 1970), Serbian footballer
- Radoslav Shandarov (born 1996), Bulgarian tennis player
- Radoslav Školník (born 1979), Slovak footballer
- Radoslav Sloboda, Slovak ice hockey player
- Radoslav Stojanović (handball) (born 1978), Macedonian handball player and coach
- Radoslav Stojanović, professor of law at the University of Belgrade and politician
- Radoslav Suchý (born 1976), Slovak ice hockey player
- Radoslav Suslekov (born 1974), Bulgarian boxer
- Radoslav Svoboda (born 1957), Czechoslovak ice hockey player
- Radoslav Terziev (born 1994), Bulgarian footballer
- Radoslav Tsonev (born 1995), Bulgarian footballer
- Radoslav Tybor (born 1989), Slovak ice hockey player
- Radoslav Uzunov (born 2006), Bulgarian footballer
- Radoslav Vanko (born 1983), Slovak model
- Radoslav Vasilev (born 1990), Bulgarian footballer
- Radoslav Velikov (born 1983), Bulgarian freestyle wrestler
- Radoslav Večerka (1928–2017), Czech linguist and university professor
- Radoslav Yankov (born 1990), Bulgarian snowboarder
- Radoslav Zabavník (born 1980), Slovak footballer
- Radoslav Zdravkov (born 1956), Bulgarian footballer
- Radoslav Zhivkov (born 1999), Bulgarian footballer
- Radoslav Židek (born 1981), Slovak snowboarder
- Radoslav Zlatanov (born 1987), Bulgarian track and field athlete

== See also ==
- Radoslav Gospel, 1429 manuscript by Serbian scribe
- Radosav, alternative form of the name
- Radosław (given name), Polish form
- Radoslava, feminine form of the name
- Radosavljević, patronymic surname
- Radič
