= Kalenić =

Kalenić may refer to:

- Kalenić (Belgrade), an urban neighborhood of Belgrade, Serbia
  - Kalenić market, one of major open markets in Belgrade, Serbia
- Kalenić (Ub), a village near Ub in Central Serbia
- Kalenićki Prnjavor, a village near Rekovac in Central Serbia
  - Kalenić Monastery, a Serbian Orthodox monastery
- Kalenići, village near Požega in Central Serbia
