= Rastislalić noble family =

Serbian noble family

Rastislalić
- Country: Serbian Empire; Kingdom of Hungary
- Founded: before 1352
- Final ruler: Radič Branković
- Titles: Lord (domesticus)
- Estate: Braničevo
- Dissolution: 1379 (Eviction)

The Rastislalić family (Растислалић) was a Serbian noble family that held lands in the Braničevo region of Serbia in the 14th century, initially under the Serbian crown and later under the Hungarian. They held župas of Braničevo and Kučevo.

== History ==
During the rule of Stefan Uroš IV Dušan 'the Mighty' (r. 1331-1355), Branko Rastislalić (d. 1352) gained control of the Braničevo region. He was accidentally killed in a hunting accident by voivode Vuk Kosača, starting a feud between the two families. His relatives avenged his death in 1359, when they murdered Vuk.

Over the years, the feud continued between the two families. While Emperor Stefan Uroš V 'the Weak' was at war with the self-proclaimed Emperor of Serbs and Greeks — Simeon Uroš Nemanjić, the Rastislalić turned to the other side of the Danube, where Hungarian-ruled territory in Mačva was held by Ban Nicholas I Garay. A Hungarian band was sent to take care of the enemies in Braničevo, and they became vassals of the Kingdom of Hungary. In 1359, perhaps at their invitation, Louis I of Hungary marched into Serbia and defeated Uroš V.

Radič Branković was the last landed feudal lord of this family; he was evicted in 1379 by Knez Lazar who invaded Braničevo, after conquering lands of Nikola Altomanović and consolidated the power of Moravian Serbia.

The family issued a regional currency, the "Helmet dinars" one of only three to be created prior to the end of the Serbian Empire in 1371.

== Members ==
- Branko Rastislalić, domesticus of Podunavlje (d. 1352), Serbian crown
  - Radič Branković, Lord of Braničevo -1379, under Hungarian crown
- Brajko, nobleman
- Raosav, nobleman
- Radoslav Rastislalić
