= Radic =

Radic may refer to:

- Radić, South Slavic surname
- Radič, Serbian medieval given name
- Radíč, a village in Czechia
