= Radičević (surname) =

Radičević (Serbian: Радичевић) is a Serbian surname derived from a masculine given name Radič. Notable people with the surname include:

- Branko Radičević (1824–1853), Serbian poet
- Jovanka Radičević (born 1986), Montenegrin handball player
- Nikola Radičević (born 1994), Serbian basketball player
