= Mirko Đorđević =

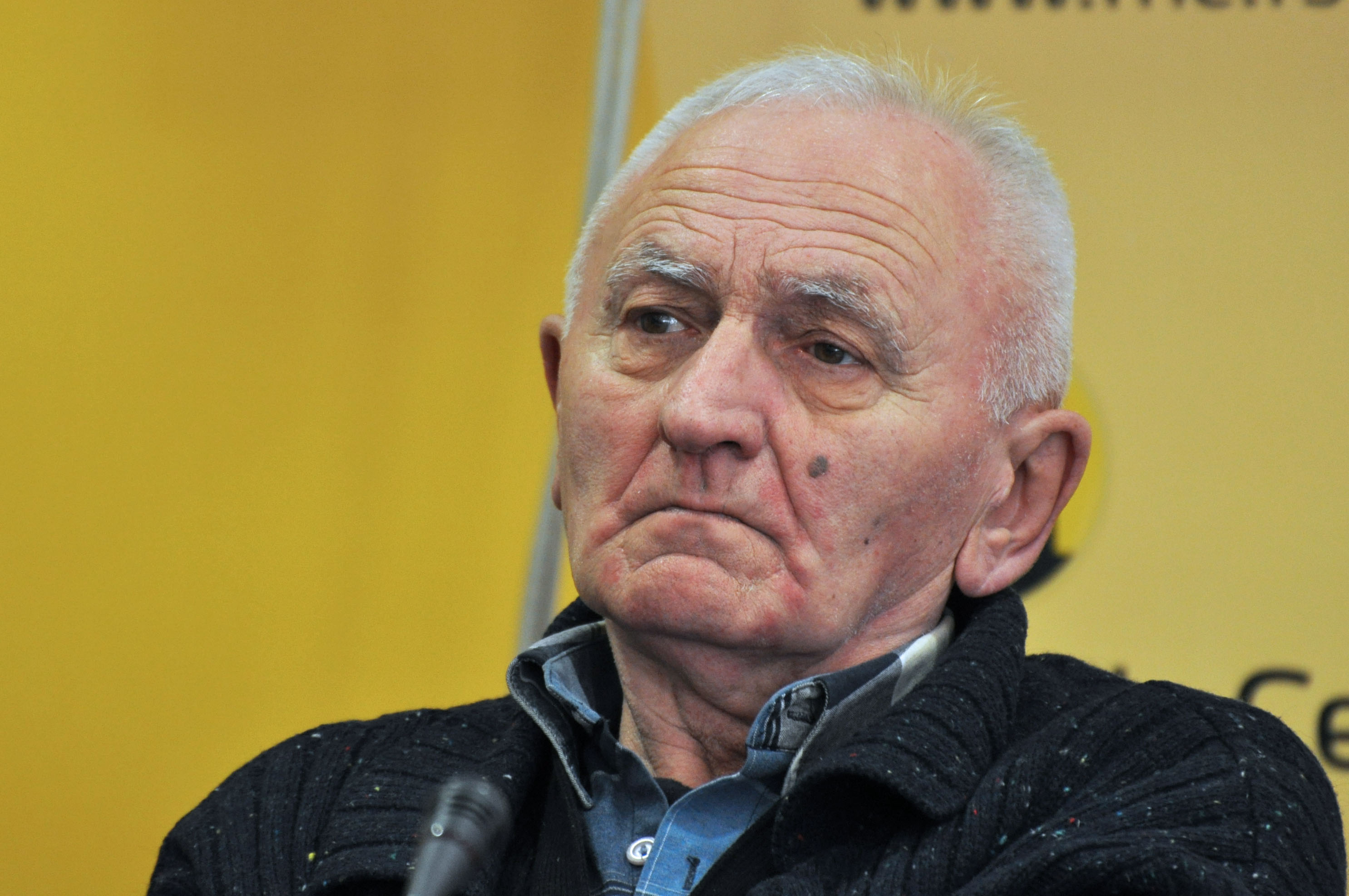
- Born: 29 November 1938 Brod, Kingdom of Yugoslavia
- Died: 18 April 2014, (aged 75), Šimanovci, Serbia
- Occupation: Author, professor
- Spouse: Mira Đorđević
- Children: 2 (son and daughter)

Mirko Đorđević (Serbian-Cyrillic: Мирко Ђорђевић; 29 November 1938, Brod – 18 April 2014, Šimanovci) was a Serbian publicist and editorial-staff-member of Republika magazine. Although Christian, he was heterodox in his Christology, a critic of the Serbian Orthodox Church, its nationalism and advocate for secularism. Đorđević was an opponent of political intolerances in Serbian society.

== Biography ==
Đorđević was born in the Belčine mahala, located in the Crna Trava municipality, a part of the Jablanica District, on 29 November 1938 to Čedomir and Rajinka Đorđević. In 1964, Đorđević graduated from the University of Belgrade Faculty of Philology, having previously studied Yugoslavian Literature. He received his master's degree in 1975 and became a Serbo-Croatian teacher in a Šimanovci primary school. He also taught Serbo-Croatian Language and Literature at the Belgrade Pedagogical Academy before he had retired.

He was married to Mirjana, with whom he had two children, a son and a daughter, respectively called Aleksandar and Ksenija. Đorđević died in 2014, aged 75.

== Points of view ==
=== Criticism of the Serbian Orthodox Church ===
Đorđević championed ecumenism and, having vociferously opposed the right-wing nikolajevci (followers of Nikolaj Velimirović) and justinovci (followers of Justin Popović) factions within the Serbian Orthodox Church (hereafter SPC), pushed for evangelisation, not clericalisation, terming those in favour of the latter as "captives of phyletism". He considered the SPC to be a surrogate for the Central Committee of the League of Communists of Yugoslavia in post-Titoist Yugoslavia. Staunchly opposed to Milošević, Đorđević found himself disheartened by the ostensible support of the SPC for his regime. Ultimately, Đorđević believed the Church to be a salvific institution and as such, disqualified from becoming too involved with local politics.

=== Historical Jesus ===
While remaining true to the traditional Christian belief in regard to Jesus' divinity, exemplified by the title Son of God, Đorđević was quick to add that Jesus was the Son of God "much like the rest of us" thus repudiating the traditionally prevalent Christological notion of dyophysitism. Đorđević didn't believe Jesus committed any of the miracles attributed to him in the New Testament. Upon criticising Anti-Semitism, he besought the Christians of Serbia not to be swayed by Anti-Semitism, reminding them that both Jesus and his Apostles have all been Jewish. He also believed that Jesus had been in a romantic relationship with Mary Magdalene and opted for a figurative interpretation of his resurrection, rather than a literal one.

== Bibliography (selection) ==
- Осмех богиње Клио (The Smile of the Goddess Clio), Belgrade 1986.
- Знаци времена (Signs of Times), Belgrade 1998.
- Слобода и спас: хришћански персонализам (Freedom and Salvation: Christian Personalism), Belgrade 1999.
- La Voix d'une autre Serbie : L'Anti-journal (The Voice of Another Serbia: The Anti-Journal), Saint-Maur-des-Fossés 1999.
- Ратни крст српске цркве (The Crusade of Serbian Church), Belgrade 2001.
- Легенда о трулом Западу (Legend of the Rotten West), Belgrade 2001.
- Кишобран патријарха Павла: критика паланачког ума (Umbrella of Patriarch Pavle: Criticism on Provincial Mind), Belgrade 2010.
