= Radosav =

Slavic masculine given name

- Gender: masculine

Origin
- Language: Slavic

Other names
- Related names: Radoslav, Radosław

Radosav (Cyrillic: Paдocaв) is a Montenegrin masculine given name. Notable people with the name include:

- Radosav Aleksić (born 1986), Serbian footballer
- Radosav Bulić (born 1977), Montenegrin retired footballer
- Radosav Spasojević (born 1992), Montenegrin basketballer
- Radosav Petrović (born 1989), Serbian footballer
- Radosav Stojanović (born 1950), Serbian writer

== See also ==
- Radoslav, given name
- Radosavljević, patronymic surname
