= Morbidelli (surname) =

Morbidelli is an Italian surname that may refer to the following notable people:

- Alessandro Morbidelli (astronomer) (born 1966), Italian astronomer
- Alessandro Morbidelli (footballer) (born 1989), Italian footballer
- Emiliano Morbidelli (born 1977), Italian long-distance runner and road racing cyclist
- Franco Morbidelli (born 1994), Italian motorcycle racer
- Gianni Morbidelli (born 1968), Italian racing driver
- Pasqualino Morbidelli (1948–2020), Italian boxer
