= Boychev =

Boychev is a surname. Notable people with the surname include:

- Hristo Boychev (born 1950), Bulgarian novelist
- Lachezar Boychev (born 1957), Bulgarian rower
- Nikola Boychev (born 1979), Bulgarian footballer
- Radoslav Boychev (born 1981), Bulgarian politician
