= Kulig (surname) =

Kulig is a surname found predominantly in Poland. It may refer to:

- Curtis Kulig (born 1981), American artist
- Damian Kulig (born 1987), Polish basketball player
- Janusz Kulig (born 1967), Polish rally driver
- Joanna Kulig (born 1982), Polish actress
- Kim Kulig (born 1990), German footballer
- Przemysław Kulig (born 1980), Polish footballer
