= Radosław (given name) =

Male given name

- Pronunciation: Polish: [raˈdɔ.swaf]
- Gender: male
- Language: Polish

Origin
- Region of origin: Poland

Other names
- Related names: Radoslav, Radomir

Radosław (Polish: [raˈdɔ.swaf]) is a Polish masculine given name, derived from the Slavic elements radŭ ("happy, willing") and slava ("glory"). It is a variant of the Slavic name Radoslav.

== Notable people with the name ==
- Radosław Baran (born 1989), Polish wrestler
- Radosław Biliński (born 1972), Polish footballer
- Radosław Chruściński (born 1991), Polish pair skater
- Radosław Cielemęcki (born 2003), Polish footballer
- Radosław Cierzniak (born 1983), Polish footballer
- Radosław Fogiel (born 1982), Polish politician
- Radosław Gilewicz (born 1971), Polish football pundit and former player
- Radosław Gil (born 1997), Polish volleyball player
- Radosław Gołębiowski (born 2001), Polish footballer
- Radosław Gruk (born 1971), Polish diplomat
- Radosław Horbik (born 1977), Polish freestyle wrestler
- Radosław Janukiewicz (born 1984), Polish footballer
- Radosław Jasiński (born 1971), Polish footballer
- Radosław Jedynak (1982), Polish chess grandmaster
- Radosław Kaim (born 1973), Polish actor
- Radosław Kanach (born 1999), Polish footballer
- Radosław Kawęcki (born 1991), Polish swimmer
- Radosław Kałużny (born 1974), Polish footballer
- Radosław Król (born 1975), Polish politician
- Radosław Kursa (born 1989), Polish footballer
- Radosław Majdan (born 1972), Polish footballer and television personality
- Radosław Majecki (born 1999), Polish footballer
- Radosław Majewski (born 1986), Polish footballer
- Radosław Marcinkiewicz (born 1986), Polish freestyle wrestler
- Radosław Matusiak (born 1982), Polish footballer
- Radosław Michalski (born 1969), Polish footballer
- Radosław Mroczkowski (born 1967), Polish football manager and former player
- Radosław Murawski (born 1994), Polish footballer
- Radosław Nijaki (born 1982), Polish tennis player
- Radosław Ostrowski (1887–1976), also known as Radasłaŭ Astroŭski, Belarusian collaborator with Nazi Germany
- Radosław Panas (born 1970), Polish volleyball player
- Radosław Parda (born 1979), Polish politician
- Radosław Pindiur (born 1988), Canadian-Polish footballer
- Radosław Piwowarski (born 1948), Polish film director, screenwriter and actor
- Radosław Popławski (born 1983), Polish long-distance runner
- Radosław Pruchnik (born 1986), Polish footballer
- Radosław Romanik (born 1967), Polish cyclist
- Radosław Rybak (born 1973), Polish volleyball player
- Radosław Seweryś (born 2004), Polish footballer
- Radosław Sikorski (born 1963), Polish politician and journalist
- Radosław Sobolewski (born 1976), Polish footballer and football manager
- Radosław Sylwestrzak (born 1992), Polish footballer
- Radosław Słodkiewicz (born 1976), Polish body builder
- Radosław Trojan (born 1992), Polish acrobatic gymnast
- Radosław Truszkowski (born 1978), Polish Greco-Roman wrestler
- Radosław Wiśniewski (born 1992), Polish footballer
- Radosław Wojtaszek (born 1987), Polish chess grandmaster
- Radosław Zawrotniak (born 1981), Polish fencer
- Radosław Zbierski (born 1988), Polish volleyball player
- Radosław Zmitrowicz (born 1962), Polish-Ukrainian Roman Catholic bishop
- Jan Mazurkiewicz (1896–1988), codename Radosław, colonel of Armia Krajowa and a general in the People's Army of Poland

== See also ==
- Radoslav (given name)
- Radomir (given name)
- Polish name
- Slavic names
