= Alessandro Morbidelli =

Alessandro Morbidelli may refer to:

- Alessandro Morbidelli (footballer) (born 1989), Italian football/soccer player
- Alessandro Morbidelli (astronomer) (born 1966), astronomer and planetary scientist
