= Radomir =

Radomir may refer to:

== People ==
- Radomir (given name), a Slavic male given name
- Gavril Radomir of Bulgaria (died 1015), Tsar of Bulgaria

== Places ==
- Radomir (Cetinje), a village in Cetinje Municipality, Montenegro
- Radomir (mountain), a mountain peak on the Bulgarian/Greek border
- Radomir (town), a town in Pernik Province, Bulgaria
- Radomir Municipality, a municipality in Pernik Province, Bulgaria
- Radomir, a village in Dioști Commune, Dolj County, Romania
