= Radosavljević =

Radosavljević (Serbian Cyrillic: Радосављевић) is a Serbian surname, a patronymic derived from the given names Radoslav and Radosav. Notable people with the name include:

- Artemije Radosavljević (1935–2020)k Serbian Orthodox bishop
- Aleksandar Radosavljević (footballer born 1979), Slovenian footballer and coach
- Aleksandar Radosavljević (footballer born 1982), Serbian footballer
- Daša Radosavljević (born 1996)k Serbian dancer and beauty pageant titleholder
- Dejan Radosavljević (born 1979), Serbian footballer
- Dragan Radosavljević (born 1982), Serbian footballer
- Goran Radosavljević (born 1957), Serbian former police colonel general
- Ivica Radosavljević (born 1983), Swiss-Serbian basketball player
- Jana Radosavljević (born 1996), New Zealand footballer of Serbian descent
- Lazar Radosavljević (born 1991), Serbian professional basketball player
- Ludovic Radosavljevic (born 1989), French rugby player of Serbian descent
- Marija Radosavljević (born 1927), Yugoslav shot putter
- Miloš Radosavljević (footballer) (born 1988), Serbian footballer
- Miloš Radosavljević (politician) (1889–1944), Serbian politician
- Nenad Radosavljević (born 1961), Kosovo Serb politician, administrator, and media owner
- Nikola Radosavljević (born 1968), Serbian killer
- Nikola Radosavljević (politician) (born 1975), Serbian politician
- Nedeljko Radosavljević (born 1965), Serbian historian
- Panta Radosavljević (1876–1941), Serbian army officer
- Predrag "Preki" Radosavljević (born 1963), Serbian-born American soccer player and coach
- Sanja Radosavljević (born 1994), Serbian handball player
- Stefan Radosavljevic (born 2000), Faroe Islands footballer of Serbian descent
- Zoran Radosavljević (footballer) (born 1968), Serbian footballer
- Zoran Radosavljević (pilot) (1965–1999), Yugoslav fighter pilot
