= Radoslava =

Slavic feminine given name

- Pronunciation: Serbo-Croatian: [râdoslaʋa]
- Gender: feminine

Origin
- Language: Slavic

Other names
- Derived: rad- ("happy, eager, to care") and slava ("glory, fame")
- Related names: Radoslav (m)

Radoslava (Cyrillic: Радослава) is a Slavic feminine given name, derived from the Slavic elements rad- ("happy, eager, to care") and slava ("glory, fame"). It is the feminine form of Radoslav.

Notable people with the name include:

- Radoslava Bachvarova (born 1987), Bulgarian basketball player
- Radoslava Georgieva (born 1976), Bulgarian diver
- Radoslava Slavcheva (born 1984), Bulgarian footballer
- Radoslava Mavrodieva (born 1987), Bulgarian athlete
- Radoslava Topalova (born 1980), Bulgarian tennis player
- Radoslava Vorgić (born 1985), Serbian opera singer

== See also ==
- Radoslav, male form of the name
- Slavic names
