= Radan, Iran =

Radan (Persian: رادان) in Iran may refer to:

- Raddan, Isfahan Province
- Raran, Iran, Isfahan Province
- Radan, Sistan and Baluchestan
