= Mrągowo =

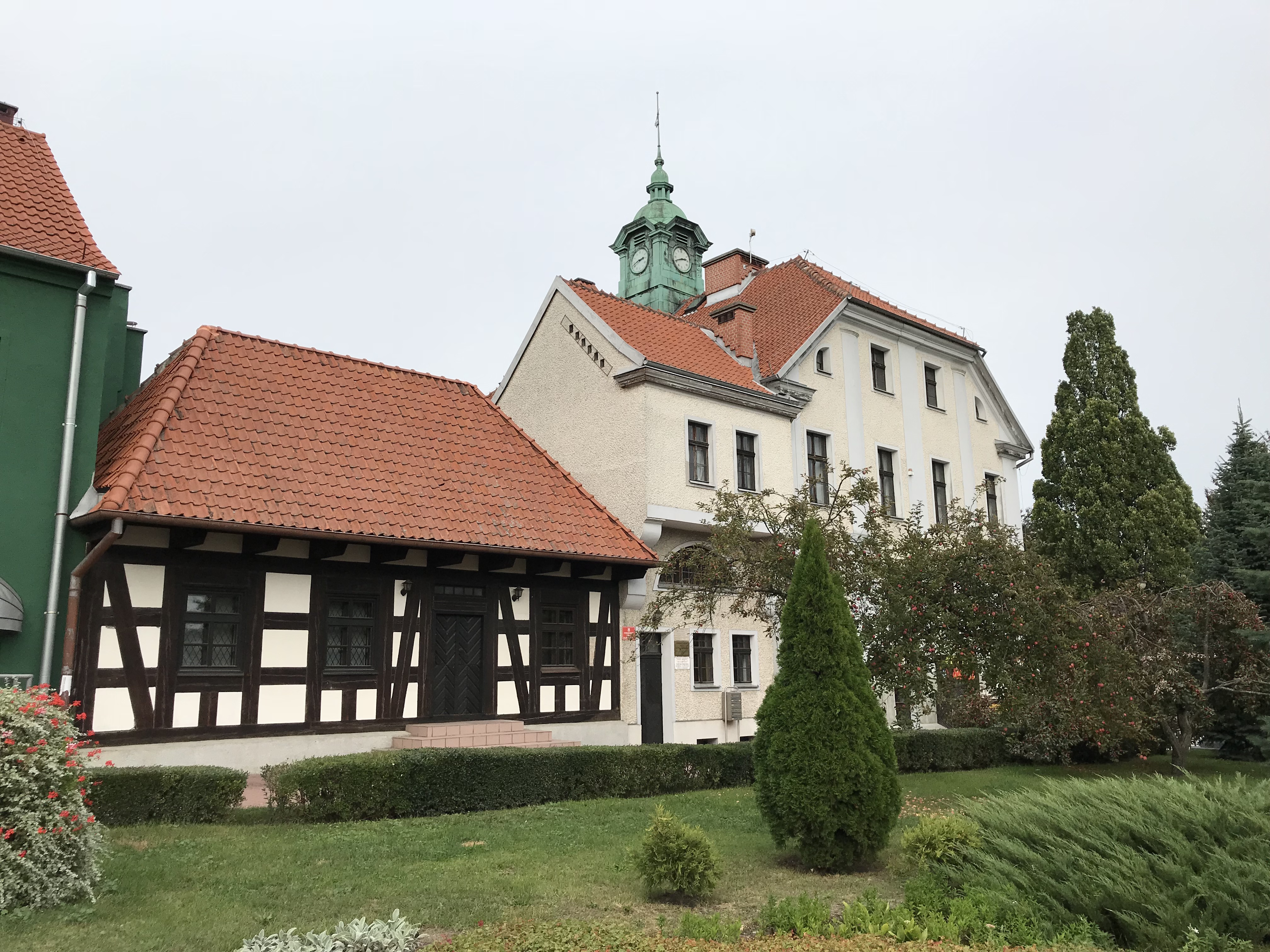
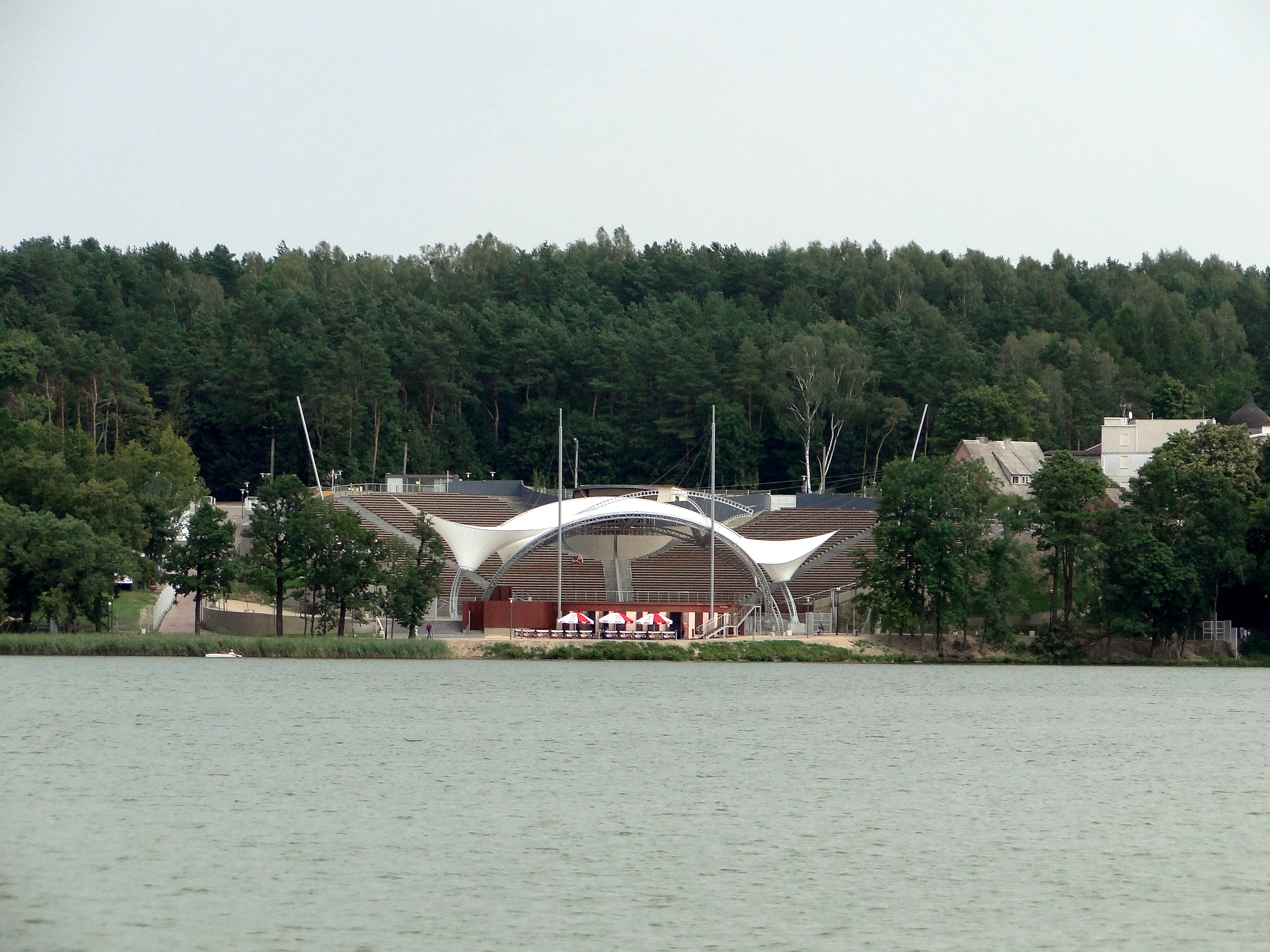
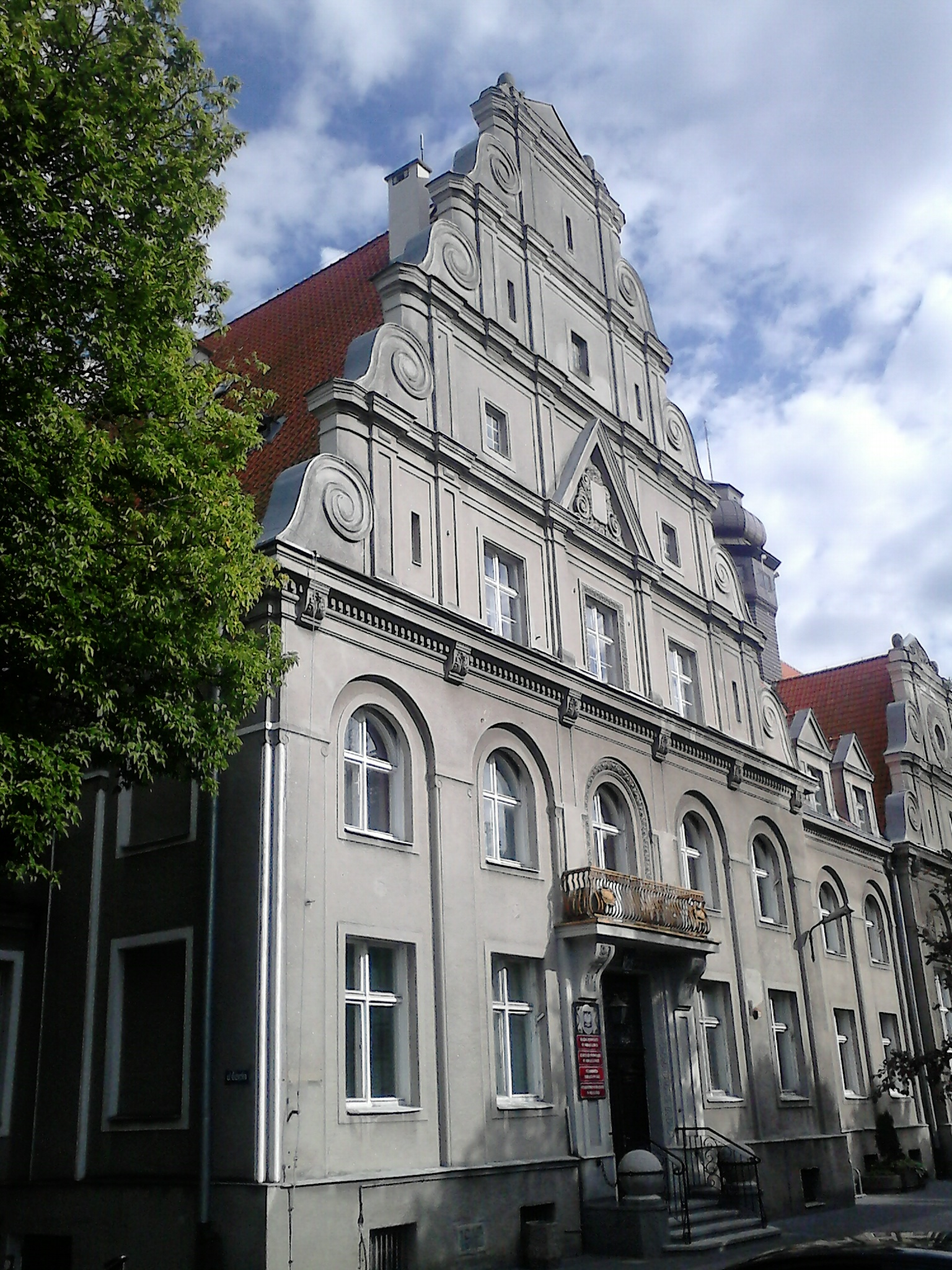
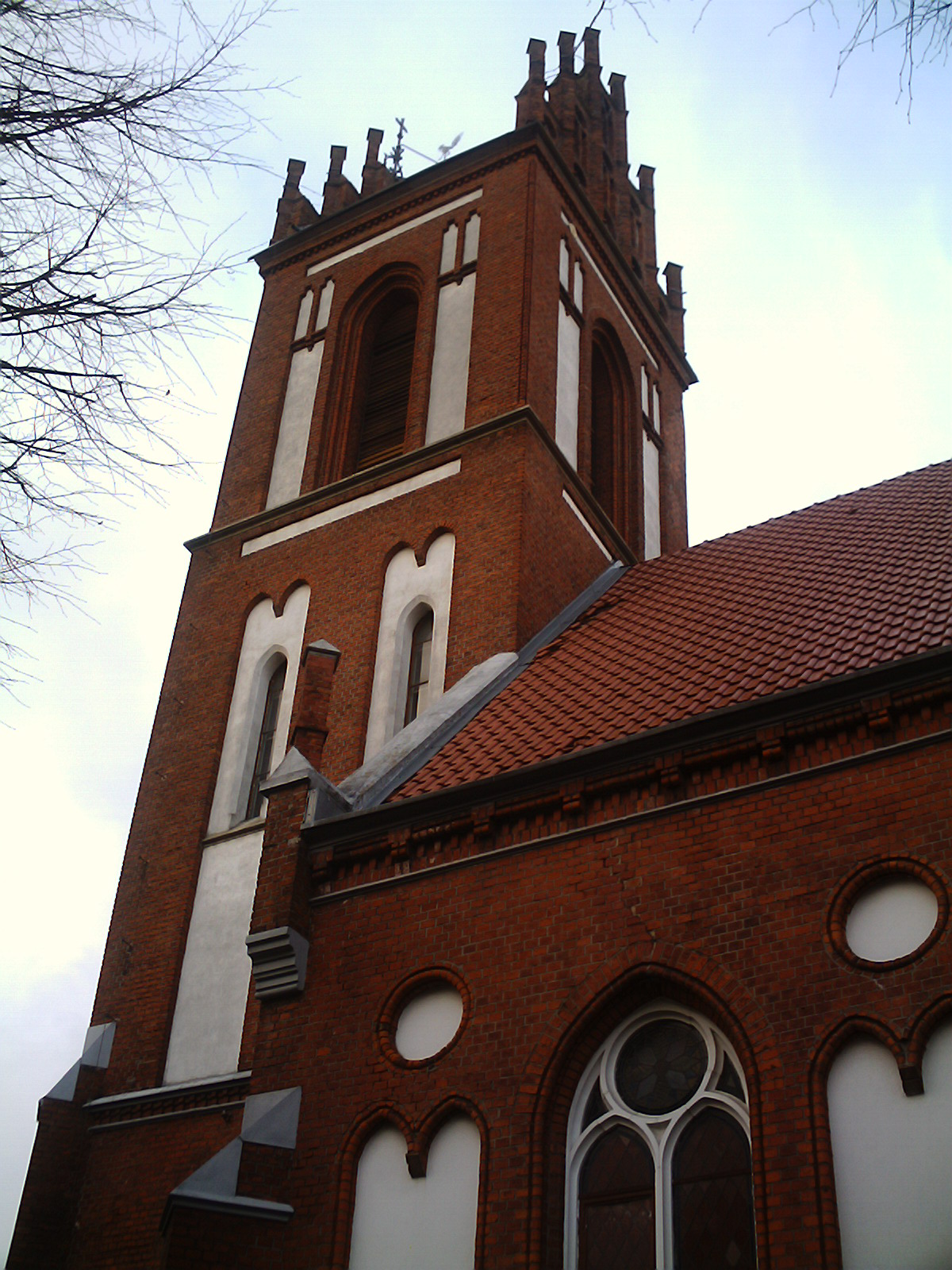
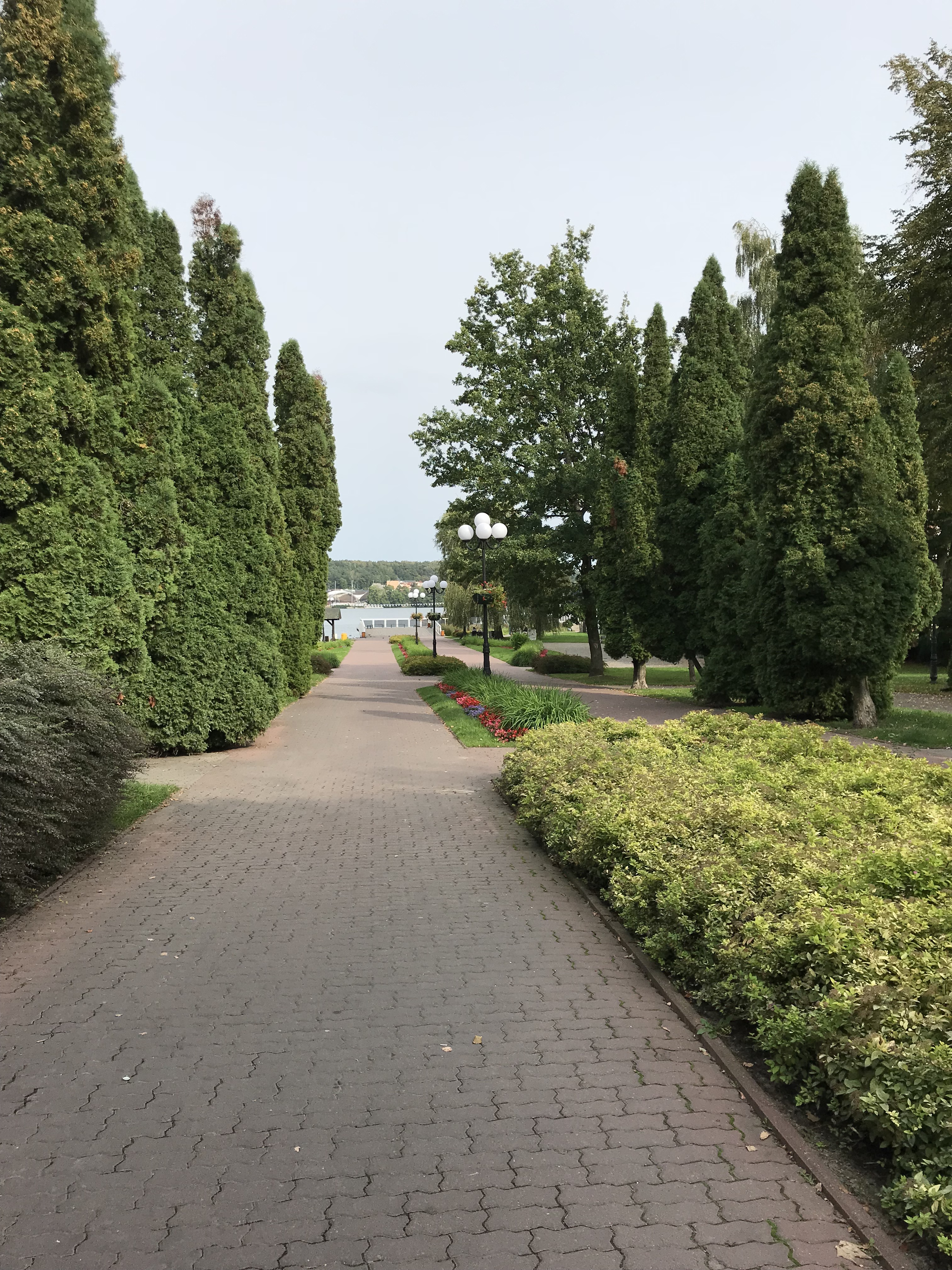
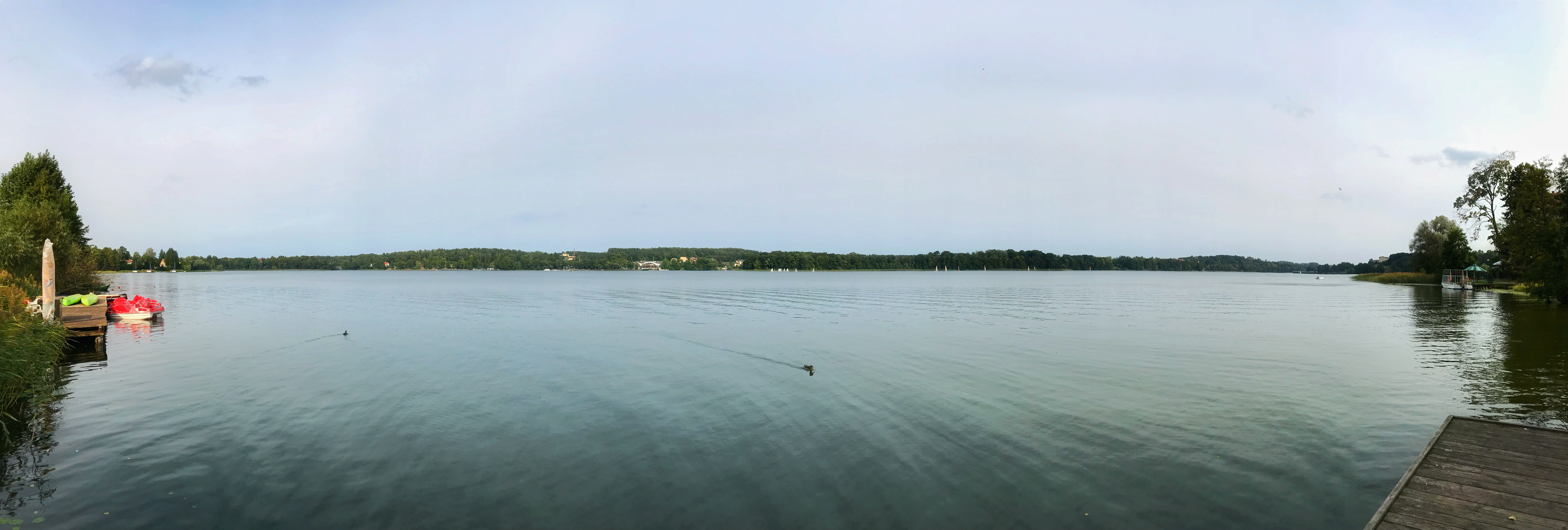
- Town Hall Amphitheater District office Saint Adalbert Church Promenade Lake Czos

- Flag Coat of arms

- Location within Poland
- Coordinates: 53°52′N 21°18′E
- Country: Poland
- Voivodeship: Warmian-Masurian
- County: Mrągowo
- Gmina: Mrągowo (urban gmina)
- Established: 1348
- Town rights: 1444

Government
  - Mayor: Jakub Doraczyński

Area
  - Total: 14.8 km^{2} (5.7 sq mi)
- Highest elevation: 200 m (660 ft)
- Lowest elevation: 20 m (66 ft)

Population (2025)
  - Total: 20,339
  - Density: 1,370/km^{2} (3,560/sq mi)
- Time zone: UTC+1 (CET)
  - Summer (DST): UTC+2 (CEST)
- Postal code: 11-700 to 11-709
- Area code: +48 89
- Car plates: NMR
- Website: mrągowo.pl

Mrągowo [mrɔŋˈɡɔvɔ] (until 1947 Polish: Ządźbork [ˈʐɔɲd͡ʑbɔrk]; German: Sensburg [ˈzɛnsbʊʁk]) is a resort town in the Warmian-Masurian Voivodeship of northeastern Poland, with 20,399 inhabitants (2025). It is the capital of Mrągowo County and the seat (though not part of) the Gmina Mrągowo. The town is located in the ethnographic region of Masuria, within the Masurian Lake District, about 60 km (37 mi) east of Olsztyn.

It is situated on the shores of lakes Czos, Sutapie Małe, Sołtysko, Czarne, Juno and Piecuch.

== History ==
=== Middle Ages ===
Around 1348, the Teutonic Knights constructed a wooden fortress near present-day Mrągowo named Sensburg, derived from Old Prussian senas meaning "old", therefore maybe at the site of a former Prussian castle. The settlement that began to develop nearby was first mentioned in a 1397 deed and probably had already received Kulm town rights between 1404 and 1407, although it is verified that Grand Master Konrad von Erlichshausen affirmed town rights in 1444. In 1454 it was incorporated to Poland by King Casimir IV Jagiellon upon the request of the anti-Teutonic Prussian Confederation, and after the subsequent Thirteen Years' War it was a part of Poland as a fief. To the town's Polish population it was known as Ządźbork.

=== Modern era ===
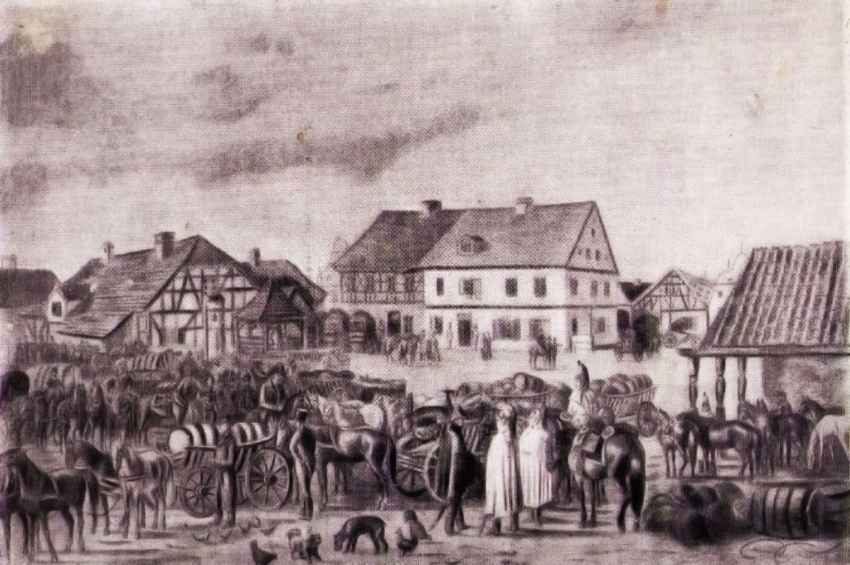
Italian troops at the Market Square in 1812 (by Albrecht Adam)

Ządźbork became part of the Duchy of Prussia, a vassal state of Poland, in 1525. In the 15th and 16th centuries, the town suffered through fires and plagues.

Part of the Kingdom of Prussia since 1701, the town was incorporated into the Province of East Prussia after its creation in 1773. It was heavily devastated during the Napoleonic Wars. It remained mostly a small hamlet in the largely rural area around it. Agriculture, fishing and the richness of the surrounding forests provided the sources of income for the local population. Just like all of Masuria the district was inhabited mainly by Poles, and town itself had majority Polish population in 1816 however in the 19th century their percentage began to decrease due to Germanisation, removal of the Polish language from schools and the pressure of the local German administration (from 86% in 1825 to 59% in 1890). The town became the county seat in 1818, with its first Landrat (country executive) being August von Lyśniewski. The Polish secret resistance was active and smuggled weapons through the town to the Russian Partition of Poland during the January Uprising. In August 1863, the Prussians discovered the activity, carried out arrests of local resistance members and seized a shipment of weapons headed to the town. In 1871 Sensburg became part of the German Empire during the Prussian-led unification of Germany. In 1897 the town became connected to the railway system, which went from Bischofsburg (Biskupiec) to Rastenburg (Kętrzyn/Rastembork). In 1903 the city received a donation from Edward Pałasz to acquire its own forest, where it then built recreational facilities.

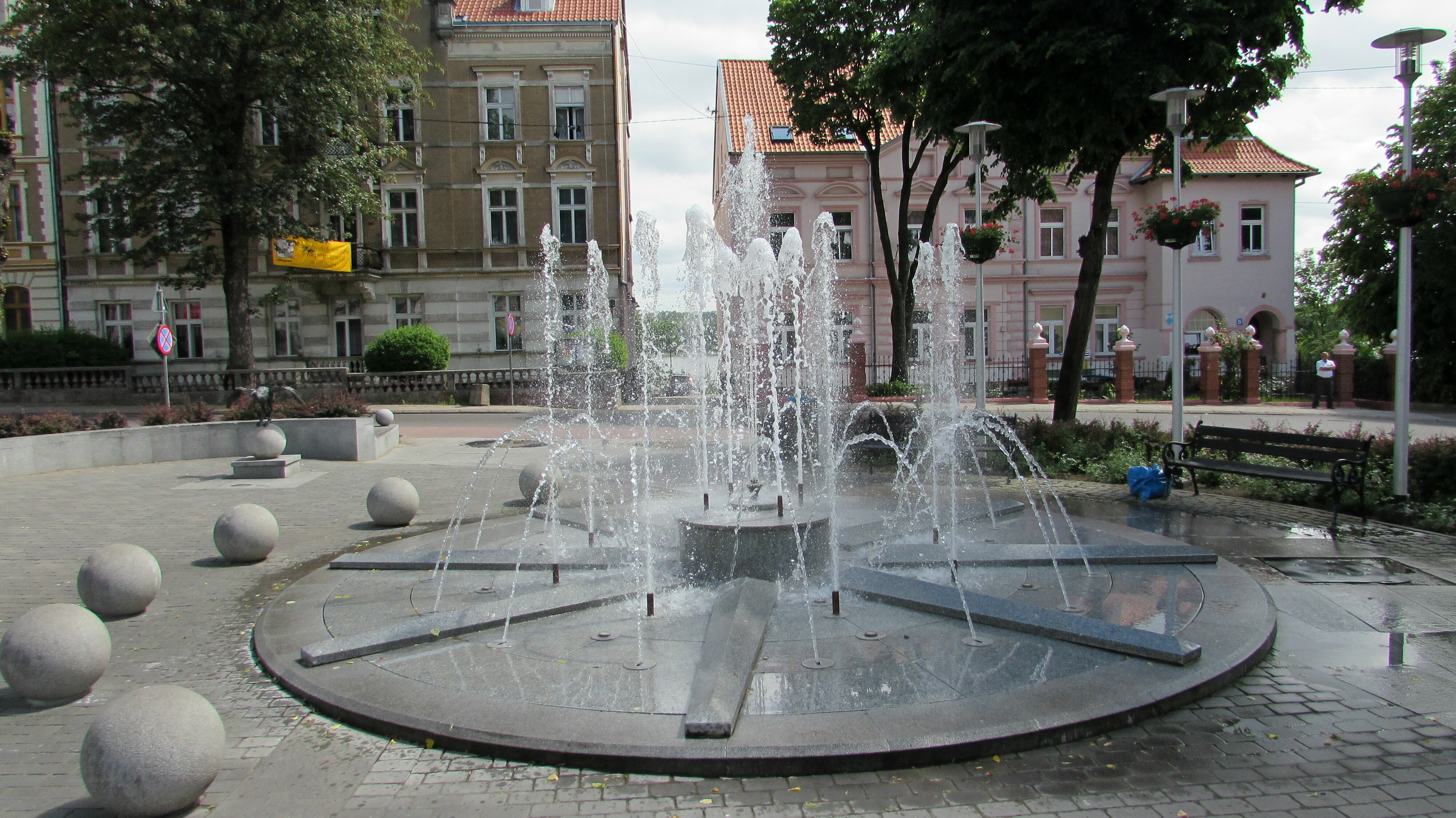
Fountain on the main square

Following World War I, as a condition of the Treaty of Versailles, the League of Nations held the East Prussian plebiscite on 11 July 1920 to determine if the people in the southern districts of East Prussia wanted to remain within the Free State of Prussia and Germany or to join the Second Polish Republic. Before the vote German nationalists engaged in brutal excesses, which remained unhindered by meagre presence of Allied forces; a Scottish regiment only once visited the city, and only to demonstrate a music orchestra. The plebiscite resulted in 3,660 votes for Germany and none for Poland.

At the end of World War II the town was occupied by the Red Army during the East Prussian Offensive, losing almost 20% of its buildings in the fighting.

From 1945 to 1947 the city was known by the historic Polish name Ządzbork. The city's name was changed to the current Mrągowo in 1947, in honor of Polish pastor, writer and translator Krzysztof Celestyn Mrongovius (1764–1855), a noted defender of the Polish language in Masuria.

The local populace was mostly spared expulsion due to their Polish ethnicity, but many resisted being treated as Poles. The 1940-50s saw repeated measures implemented to force the locals to sign that they were Poles, or to receive Polish identity cards. People who declined were often interned.

After the war, Mrągowo remained a rural town with approximately 10,000 inhabitants; this number stayed almost constant until the late 1980s. In the following decade, mostly due to economic and political changes, the town gained some influence in the region and grew quickly into a regional center for economic business and tourism. Recently, Mrągowo has tried to regain some of its former beauty and to represent the region.

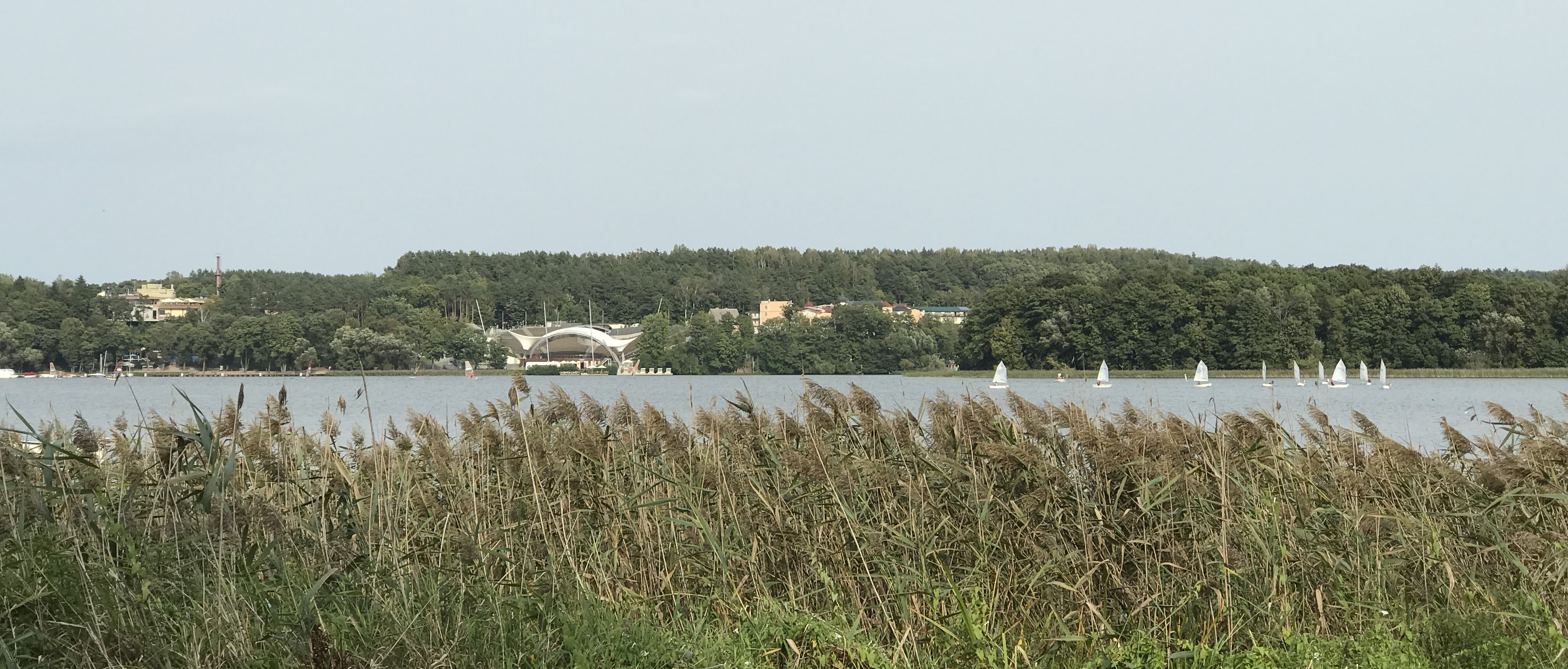
Lake Czos

== Coat of arms ==
The town's coat of arms derives from a regional story of the 15th century. It claims that when a group of local farmers was being threatened by predators, the townspeople tracked down a fearsome bear. They were only able to shoot it in its paw, and it managed to flee to Rastembork. Only upon its arrival there did the bear succumb to its injuries. The bear's paw was brought back to Ządźbork and is honored in the coat of arms.

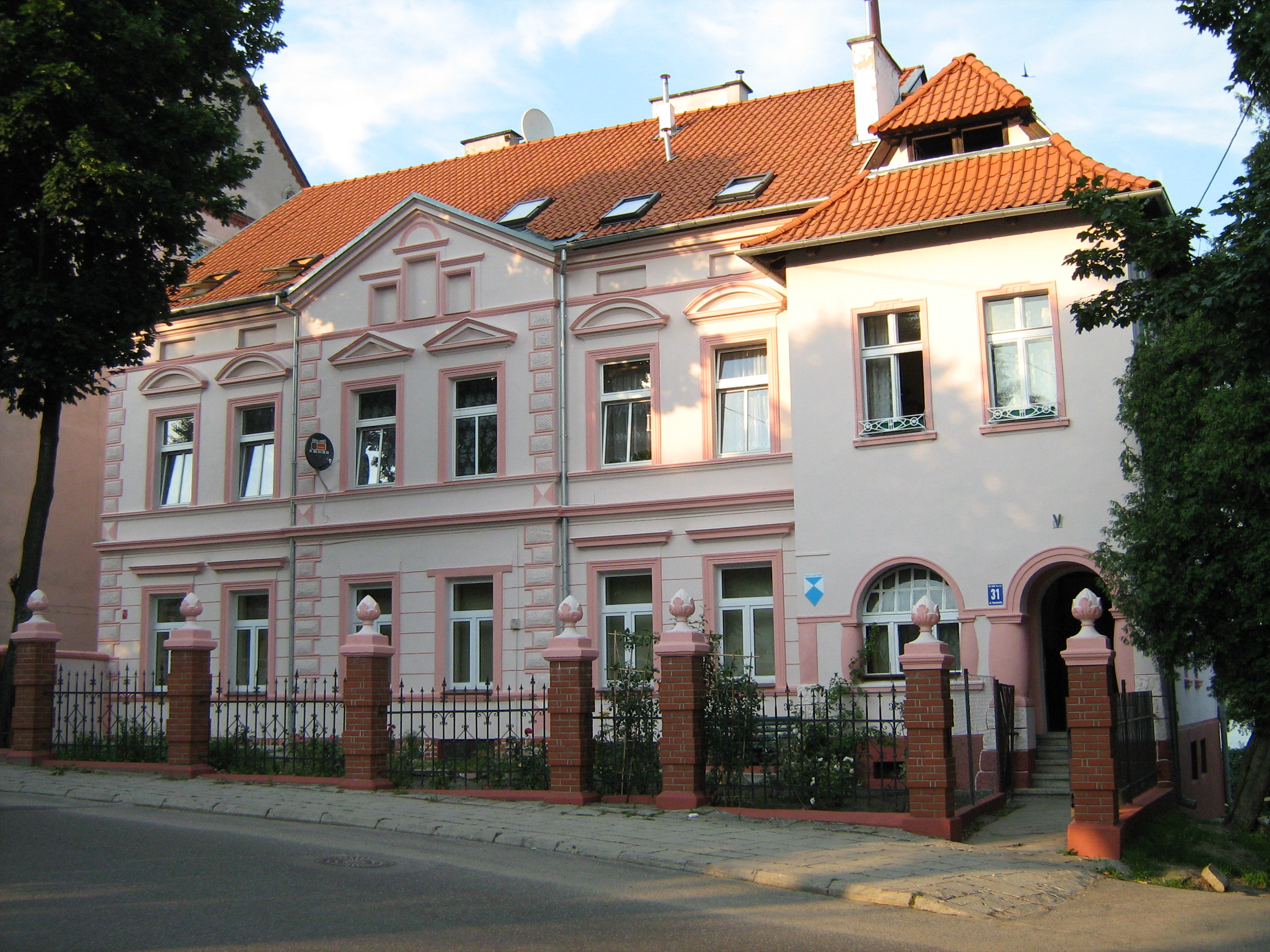
Example of a historic house in Mrągowo

== International relations ==
=== Twin towns — Sister cities ===
Mrągowo is twinned with:

- Grünberg, Germany, since 1993
- Limanowa, Poland, since 2006
- Hațeg, Romania, since 2014

=== Former twin towns ===
- Zelenogradsk, Russia

== Notable people ==
- Przemysław Kulig (b. 1980), Polish footballer
- Natalia Nykiel (b. 1995), Polish singer
- Joachim Philipkowski (b. 1961), soccer player
- Radosław Pindiur (b. 1988), Canadian-Polish footballer
- Georg Riedel (1676–1738), German composer
