= Republika (Serbian magazine) =

Republika was a Serbian magazine, published from 1989 to 2015 in Belgrade.

The magazine was started by a group of Yugoslavian intellectuals, members of the Association for Yugoslav Democratic Initiative. The periodical has been published by the cooperative Res Publica. The first editor-in-chief was its founder Nebojša Popov until 2010, his successor was Zlatoje Martinov and one of the editorial staff members was Mirko Đorđević.
