= Radek =

Radek is a masculine Christian name of Slavic origin. It is often the nickname of Radovan, Ctirad and Radoslav. It is used as a surname and given name. Notable people with the name include:

== Given name ==
- Radek Baborák, Czech conductor and French horn player
- Radek Bejbl, Czech footballer
- Radek Bělohlav, Czech ice hockey player
- Radek Bonk, Czech ice hockey player
- Radek Dosoudil, Czech footballer
- Radek Duda, Czech ice hockey player
- Radek Dvořák, Czech ice hockey player
- Radek Faksa, Czech ice hockey player
- Radek Jaroš, Czech mountaineer and author
- Radek John, Czech publicist, author and writer
- Radek Martínek, Czech ice hockey player
- Radek Pilař, Czech painter
- Radek Sikorski, Polish politician
- Radek Smoleňák, Czech ice hockey player
- Radek Štěpánek, Czech tennis player
- Radek Polak, Czech Professional Food Eater

=== Fictional characters ===
- Radek Zelenka, character in Stargate:Atlantis

== Surname ==
- Karl Radek (1885–1939), Bolshevik and international Communist leader
- General Ivan Radek, fictional communist terrorist leader of Kazakhstan in the movie Air Force One
- Viktor Radek, fictional character from the computer games Sin Episodes: Emergence

== Articles ==
- Articles beginning with "Radek"
