= Radič =

Radič (Serbian Cyrillic: Радич) is a Serbian masculine given name, popular in the Middle Ages. It is derived from the Slavic word root rad- ("happy, eager, to care"), with the Slavic suffix -ič, a diminutive of Radoslav, Radomir, etc. Notable people with the name include:

- Radič Branković (fl. 1352–79), Serbian Imperial lord of Braničevo
- Radič Crnojević (fl. 1392–96), Serbian lord of Upper Zeta
- Radič Sanković (fl. 1391–1404), Bosnian lord of Nevesinje
- Radič, Grand Čelnik (fl. 1413–41), magnate of the Serbian Despotate
- Radič Božić (fl. 1502–28), last Serbian Despot
- Radič Petrović (1738–1816), Serbian Revolutionary

== See also ==
- Radić, Serbo-Croatian surname
- Radičević
- Radičevac
- Radičevci
