= Radomir Đorđević =

Radomir Đorđević Радомир Ђорђевић
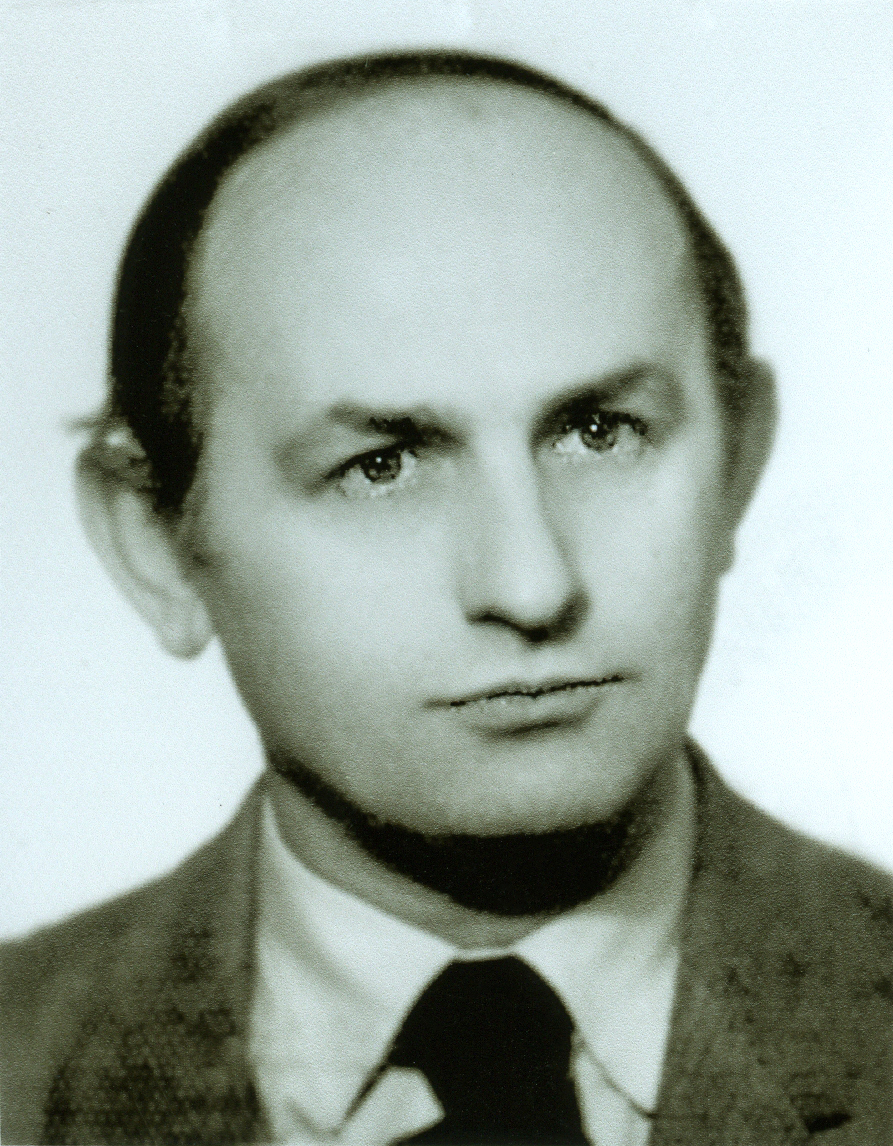
- Born: November 17, 1940 (age 85); Brod (Belčine), Crna Trava, Kingdom of Yugoslavia
- Education: University of Belgrade, Faculty of Physics

Radomir Č. Đorđević – Pule (Serbian Cyrillic: Радомир Ч. Ђорђевић – Пуле) (born 17 November 1940 in Brod (Belčine) in Crna Trava) is a retired professor of philosophy at the University of Belgrade.

== Biography ==
Đorđević – Pule completed his secondary school in Belgrade, where he also obtained his undergraduate degree in philosophy. After graduation, he was elected assistant at the Institute of Social Sciences before joining academia on 1 October 1965 at the Faculty of Physics in Belgrade, where he spent his entire working life. Additionally, he taught philosophy at the Tenth Grammar School in Belgrade (1964), the Faculty of Technology and Metallurgy (1971), the Faculty of Philology (1981-1985), the Land Forces Military Academy (1976-1978), the Faculty of Sciences at the University of Kragujevac (first as a teaching assistant for a short period of time and then, in the late eighties and early nineties as a professor). Aside from the modules Introduction to Philosophy and the Philosophy of Science, he held a special course of lectures in Philosophy of the Slavs at the Faculty of Philosophy at the University of Montenegro in Nikšić (2001-2004). He was the head of both the Department of Physics Education Methodology and the Department of History and Philosophy of Physics in the period 1985-2003. During the preparation of his Ph.D. thesis, he went on a study visit to Poland. He completed his Ph.D. at the Faculty of Philosophy in Nis on the topic The Role of Hypotheses in Science (1980).

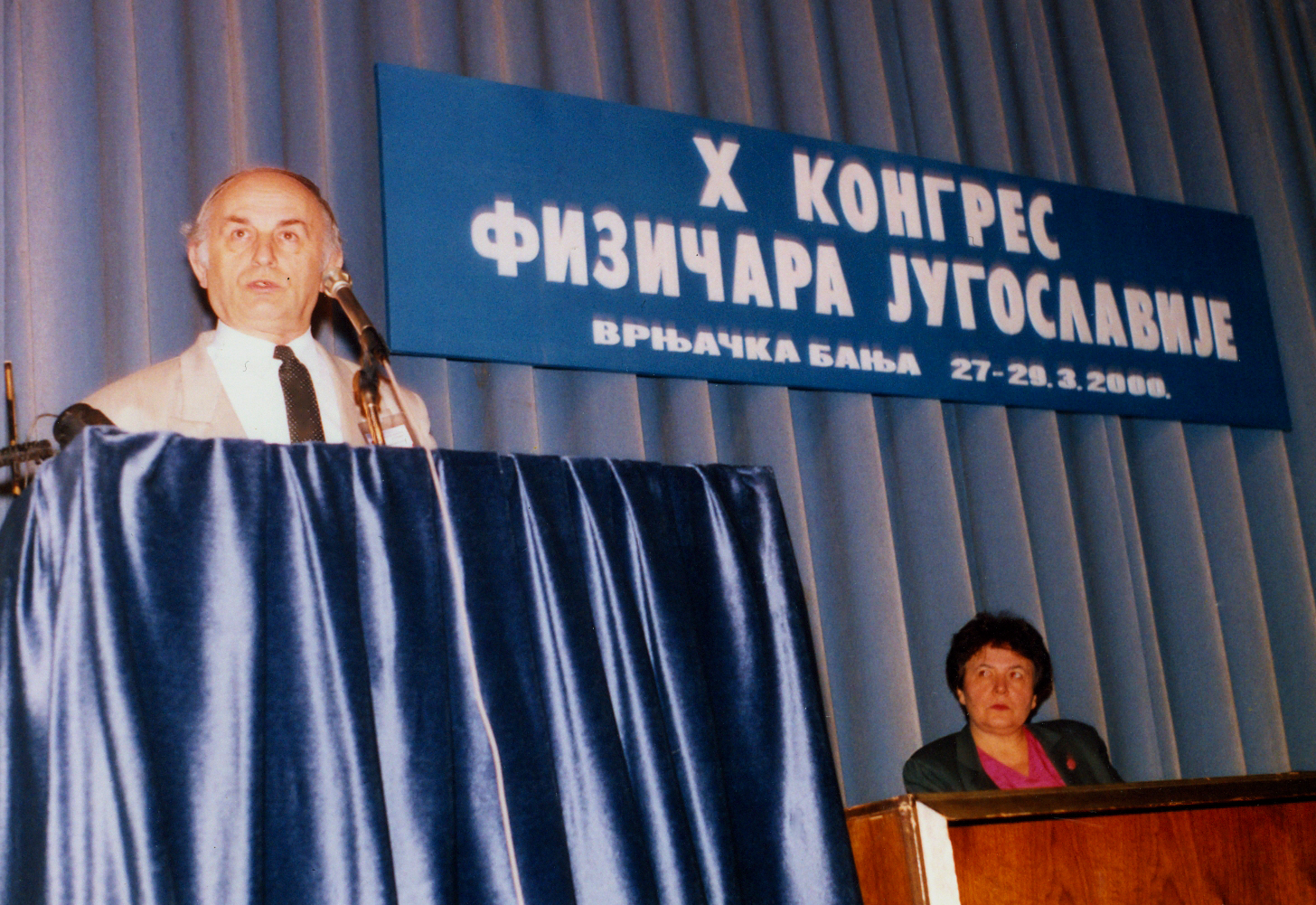
10th Congress of Yugoslavian Physicists Vrnjačka Banja, 27–29 March 2000

He participated in numerous national and international philosophical and scientific symposia, conferences and events. He was the founder of Interfaculty Professional Seminars Slavica (Serbian Cyrillic: Славика), which operated from 1995 to 1999 at the Faculty of Science, and was then the editor of the cycle of events Russian Philosophical Thought and the Problems of the Modern World (Serbian Cyrillic: Руска философска мисао и проблеми савременог света) organized at the Russian House in Belgrade, held for fifteen years. He was a member of the editorial board of journals such as The Dialectics (Serbian Cyrillic: Дијалектика), The Literature (Serbian Cyrillic: Књижевност), and The Young Physicist (Serbian Cyrillic: Млади физичар). Moreover, he was the Vice President of the Serbian Philosophical Society in several mandates and today he is a member of the executive committee of the aforementioned professional association. He was an associate of Radio Belgrade for almost a quarter of a century and long-term associate of other programs of this radio station and certain television stations. He is also a researcher in the field of the history of the Serbian philosophy.

In recognition of his contributions, he received three plaques from the Russian Cultural Centre in Belgrade, a plaque of appreciation from the Serbian Physical Society for contributions to the work of the journal The Young Physicist (Serbian Cyrillic: Млади физичар), and two plaques for the contribution to the Vlasina Meetings (Serbian Cyrillic: Власински сусрети). His bibliographical work in the period 2006-2014 will be published in the appendix of his book The Philosophical Debate With Responses to the Works of the Author (Serbian Cyrillic: Философске расправе, са одзивима на радове аутора), which is in preparation.

== Published works ==
Aside from several hundred papers of various types in over forty publications in science and philosophy, he is the author of the following books:

- Philosophy and Science (1994), Jefimija, Belgrade (Serbian Cyrillic: Философија и наука (1994), Јефимија, Београд),
- Introduction to the Philosophy of Physics (2004), Jasen, Belgrade (Serbian Cyrillic: Увод у философију физике (2004), Јасен, Београд),
- From Intuition to Hypothesis, Selected writings from the philosophy of science (2006), Institute for Philosophy and Social Theory, Belgrade (Serbian Cyrillic: Од интуиције до хипотезе, изабрани списи из философије науке, Институт за философију Философског факултета, Београд),
- Man, Values and History, Selected writings of practical and Serbian philosophy (2006), Institute for Philosophy and Social Theory, Belgrade (Serbian Cyrillic: Човек, вредности и историја, изабрани списи из практичке и српске философије (2006), Институт за философију Философског факултета, Београд),
- Studies of Russian Philosophy (2007-2011), I-II-III, ICNT, Belgrade. (Serbian Cyrillic: Студије о руској философији I-II-III, ICNТ, Београд, 2007—2011)

His Bibliography in the period 1966-2006 was published in the appendix of the book Man, Values and History (pages 351-370).

Letter from prof. dr Radomir Đorđević to prof. dr Mirjana Marković - Document

== Bibliography ==
Dobrilo Aranitović - Bio-bibliography of prof. dr Radomir Đorđević
