= Radovanović =

Radovanović (Cyrillic: Радовановић, pronounced [radoʋǎːnoʋitɕ]) is a surname derived from a masculine given name Radovan.

It may refer to:

- Aleksa Radovanović (1900–2004), Salonika front veteran
- Aleksandar Radovanović (born 1993), Serbian footballer
- Bojana Radovanović (born 2005), Serbian singer
- Branko Radovanović (born 1981), Serbian footballer
- Drinka Radovanović (born 1943), Serbian sculptor
- Igor Radovanović (born 1985), Bosnian footballer
- Ivan Radovanović (born 1988), Serbian footballer
- Luka Radovanović (c. 1425–1502), Ragusan priest and printer
- Marijana Radovanović (born 1972), Serbian singer known as Maja Marijana
- Mirko Radovanović (born 1986), Serbian footballer
- Ninoslav Radovanović (born 1940), Serbian cardiac surgeon
- Pavle Radovanović (born 1975), Montenegrin football referee
- Ratko Radovanović (born 1956), Bosnian Serb former basketball player
- Slavko Radovanović (born 1962), Yugoslav former footballer
- Soni Radovanovic (born 1988), Serbian rugby league player
- Srđan Radovanović (born 1959), Serbian lawyer and business executive
- Vanja Radovanović (born 1982), Montenegrin singer
- Vujadin Radovanović (born 1962), Serbian comic-book and graphic novel creator
