= Radoslav (painter) =

15th-century Serbian artist

Radoslav (Serbian: Радослав) was a miniaturist painter and manuscript illuminator who lived in the first part of the 15th century Serbia. Today in Serbia he is referred to as Slikar (Painter) Radoslav. Very little information is known about him, except for his five surviving, signed pieces. The fresco decorations of Kalenić Monastery is his masterpiece.

It is said that the merit of this fifteenth-century art in Serbia which was both lordly and monastic and which was the product of luxury and asceticism alike, reconciled the outer with the inner beauty. The two miniatures, one of St. Luke with a bull and the other of St. Mark with a lion are perhaps the finest examples of this complex, traditional culture, which found its most perfect expression in the art of painting. The two miniatures come from a New Testament, done at Kalenić Monastery, dating from 1429. It is now part of a collection in the National Library of Russia (since 1932 named after Mikhail Saltykov-Shchedrin).

== See also ==
- List of painters from Serbia
- Kalenić Monastery
