= Kalenićki Prnjavor =

Coordinates: 43°46′21″N 20°59′34″E

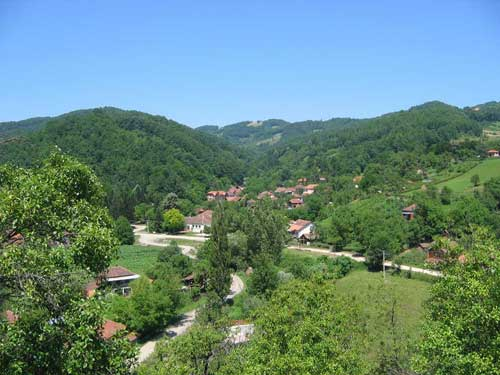
Kalenić

Kalenićki Prnjavor (Serbian Cyrillic: Каленићки Прњавор), or just Kalenić, is a village in Šumadija and Western Serbia (Šumadija), in the municipality of Rekovac. It lies at an altitude of 460 m. According to the 2002 census, the village had 154 residents. Kalenić is well known by Kalenić monastery.

== See also ==
- Kalenić Monastery
