= Radomír Šimůnek =

Radomír Šimůnek is the name of father and son Czech cyclo-cross cyclists:

- Radomír Šimůnek, Sr. (1962–2010)
- Radomír Šimůnek, Jr. (born 1983)
