= Kalenić Monastery =

Monastery in Serbia

Coordinates: 43.7722°N 20.9907°E

Kalenić monastery
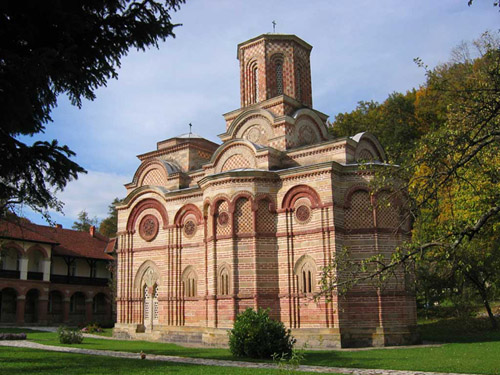
- Kalenić
- Interactive map of Kalenić monastery

Monastery information
- Full name: Манастир Каленић
- Order: Serbian Orthodox
- Established: 1407-1413

People
- Founder: Protodaviar Bogdan

Site
- Location: Kalenić, Serbia
- Public access: Yes

The Kalenić Monastery (Serbian: Манастир Каленић, romanized: Manastir Kalenić) is an important Serbian Orthodox monastery near Rekovac in central Serbia. It was built by protovestiarios Bogdan in the early 15th century (1407–1413). Village of Kalenićki Prnjavor lies nearby. Painter Radoslav came from the monastery of Kalenić.

Kalenić was declared Monument of Culture of Exceptional Importance in 1979, and it is protected by the state.

== Gallery ==
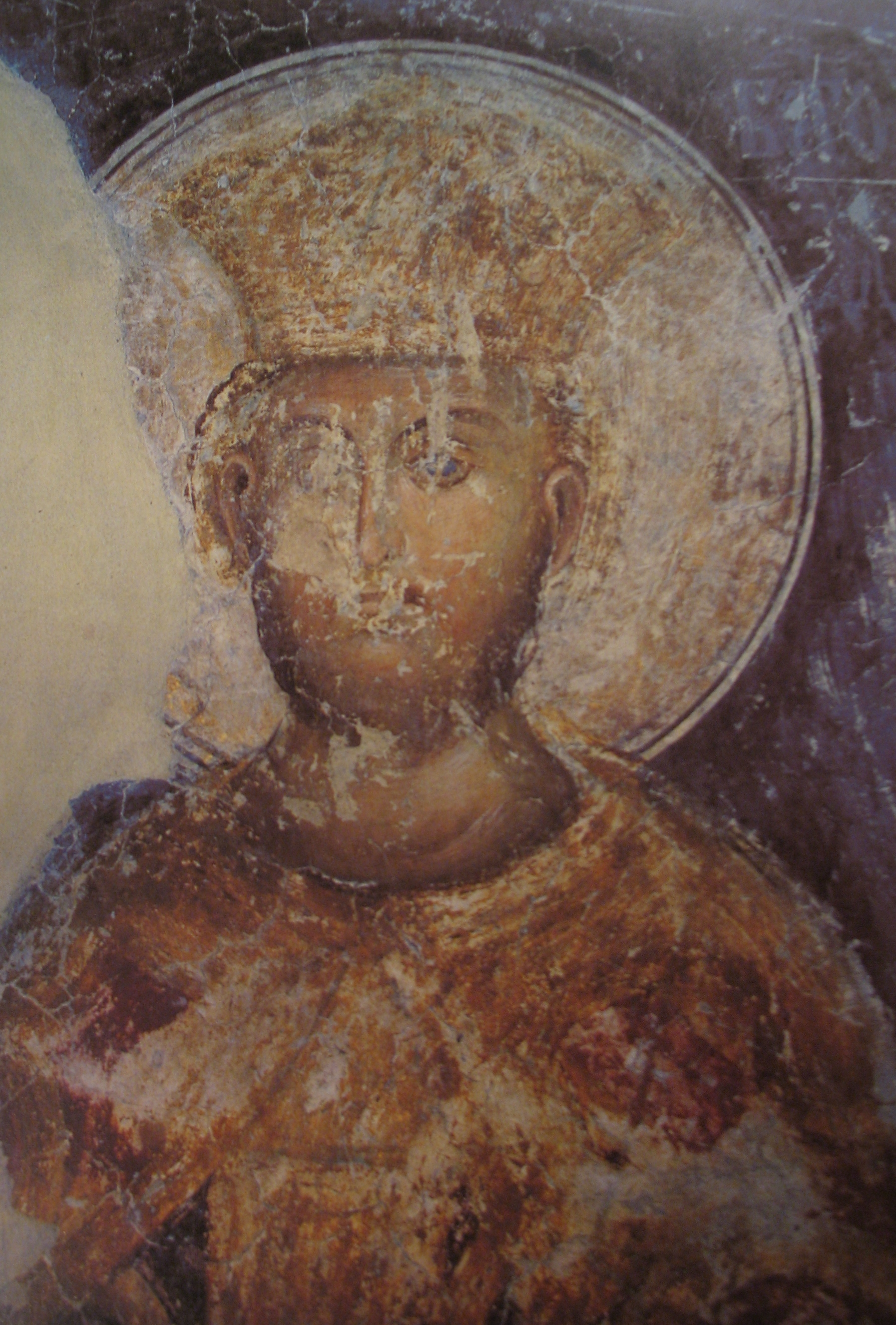
Fresco of Stefan Lazarević

== See also ==
- List of Serbian Orthodox monasteries
