= Radomir Novaković =

German-Serbian footballer

Personal information
- Date of birth: 24 January 2000 (age 26)
- Place of birth: Mönchengladbach, Germany
- Height: 1.90 m (6 ft 3 in)
- Position: Goalkeeper

Team information
- Current team: SSV Ulm
- Number: 1

Youth career
- 2004–2012: OFK Kikinda
- 2012–2014: 1. FC Mönchengladbach
- 2014–2017: Borussia Mönchengladbach
- 2017–2018: Roda JC

Senior career*
Years	Team	Apps	(Gls)
2018–2020	Roda JC	19	(0)
2020–2021	Inđija	5	(0)
2021	Ayia Napa	0	(0)
2022–2023	Schalke 04 II	16	(0)
2023–2024	Alemannia Aachen	0	(0)
2024–2026	SV Eintracht Trier 05	74	(0)
2026–	SSV Ulm	6	(0)

International career
2018	Serbia U19	1	(0)
- * Club domestic league appearances and goals as of 24 September 2026

Radomir Novaković (born 24 January 2000) is a German–Serbian footballer who plays as a goalkeeper for SSV Ulm in Regionalliga.

== Club career ==
=== OFK Kikinda ===
Novaković was born in Germany. After his second birthday, he moved with his family to Kikinda where he played for OFK Kikinda in the youth school.

=== Borussia Monchengladbach ===
Novakovic returned to Germany at the age of 12, and continued his football career in Mönchengladbach, from where he later moved to Borussia Mönchengladbach. He first played for Borussia Monchengladbach U15, then for Borussia Monchengladbach U16 and Borussia Monchengladbach U17.

=== Roda JC Kerkrade ===
At the age of 17, Novaković decided to leave Monchengladbach and go to the Roda JC Kerkrade in order to tried in professional football as well. At first, he was the starting goalkeeper of the youth team, but when he didn't concede a goal for 200 consecutive minutes, after 20 matches he was transferred from Roda U23 to the senior team. He made his Eerste Divisie debut for Roda JC Kerkrade on 7 December 2018 in a game against FC Dordrecht. He had a lot of great games, against AFC Ajax, a team that was a quarterfinalist of the UEFA Champions League at that time, FC Twente, Sparta Rotterdam, SC Heerenveen. He played 25 games and spent 2,100 minutes on the pitch in the Eredivisie, he did not concede a goal in four matches.

=== FK Inđija ===
After the structural changes in Roda, he wanted to change the environment and sign for the club where he will be the standard goalkeeper again. He made his debut for FK Inđija on 21 October 2020, in the Serbian Cup match against IMT.

=== Schalke 04 II ===
In January 2022, he returned to Germany, signing with Schalke 04 II.

=== Alemannia Aachen ===
On 26 July 2023, Alemannia Aachen announced the signing of Novaković.

== Career statistics ==
=== Club ===
As of 17 May 2023

Appearances and goals by club, season and competition
Club	Season	League			Cup		Total	
Club	Season	Division	Apps	Goals	Apps	Goals	Apps	Goals
Roda JC	2018–19	Eerste Divisie	15	0	2	0	17	0
Roda JC	2019–20	Eerste Divisie	4	0	2	0	6	0
Roda JC	Total		19	0	4	0	23	0
FK Inđija	2020–21	Serbian SuperLiga	5	0	1	0	6	0
Ayia Napa	2021–22	Cypriot Second Division	0	0	—		0	0
Schalke 04 II	2021–22	Regionalliga West	4	0	—		4	0
Schalke 04 II	2022–23	Regionalliga West	12	0	—		12	0
Schalke 04 II	Total		16	0	—		16	0
Career total			40	0	5	0	45	0

== Honours ==
Borussia Monchengladbach U16

- Mayor's cup
