= Radoslav Sloboda =

Slovak ice hockey player

- Slovak Extraliga team: HC Slovan Bratislava

Radoslav Sloboda is a Slovak professional ice hockey player who played with HC Slovan Bratislava in the Slovak Extraliga.
