= Radič Branković =

- Born: Radič Branković Rastislalić
- Title: Lord of Braničevo
- Predecessor: Branko Rastislalić
- Parent: Branko Rastislalić

Radič Branković (Serbian Cyrillic: Радич Бранковић) was a 14th-century Serbian feudal lord of Braničevo under Dušan the Mighty of the Serbian Empire.

His family (House of Rastislalić) had gained possession of Braničevo in the 14th century. His father, Branko Rastislalić, was a Domestikos of Dušan the Mighty and was titled Lord of Podunavlje until his death in 1352, Radič succeeds him as Lord of Braničevo.

He issued his own regional currency, the "Helmet dinars" only one of three existing prior to the fall of the Serbian Empire.

In 1371 Moravian Serbia succeeds the central bulk of the Serbian Empire, his possessions are now under Lazar Hrebeljanović (Tsar Lazar of Serbia). He becomes a vassal of Hungary, and is supervised by Nicholas II Garay.

Prince Lazar Hrebeljanović actively started campaigning against Nikola Altomanović in 1373, annexing his territory in accord with the Ban of Bosnia, Vuk Branković, and Đurađ Balšić. After consolidating his realm, he moved onto conquest of the Rastislalić land in Braničevo, annexing it to Moravian Serbia in 1379, thus ending the reign of the Rastislalić family.

Political offices
| Preceded by Branko as Lord of Podunavlje | Lord of Braničevo; Under Dušan the Mighty (Serbian Empire); 1352-1371 | Succeeded by Hungarian vassalage |
