= Branko Rastislalić =

Serbian noble

- Born: Branko Rastislalić
- Died: 1352
- Title: Lord of Podunavlje; Domestikos (Serbian Empire)
- Successor: Radič Branković
- Children: Radič Branković
- Parent: Rastislav

Branko Rastislalić (Serbian Cyrillic: Бранко Растислалић) was the "Lord of Podunavlje" and Domestikos under Dušan the Mighty of the Serbian Empire from circa 1340; later he became vassal of the Hungarians until his death in 1352.

Branko issued his own regional coins, the 'Helmet dinars', only one of three existing prior to the fall of the Serbian Empire. He ruled until his death in 1352, when he was accidentally killed by Vuk Kosača during a hunt. Branko's relatives later avenged his death in 1359, when they murdered Vuk.

He was succeeded by his son Radič Branković, Lord of Braničevo.

Political offices
Preceded by Rastislav	Lord of Podunavlje; Under Dušan the Mighty (Serbian Empire); ~1340–1352	Succeeded by Radič as Lord of Braničevo

== Sources ==
- Oblasni gospodari u 14. veku, page 2 (Serbian)
