= Radu-ye Pain =

Radu-ye Pain رادوپايين
- Village
- Location within Iran
- Coordinates: 25°36′38″N 61°07′42″E
- Country: Iran
- Province: Sistan and Baluchestan
- County: Chabahar
- Bakhsh: Polan
- Rural District: Polan

Population (2006)
  - Total: 121
- Time zone: UTC+3:30 (IRST)
  - Summer (DST): UTC+4:30 (IRDT)

Radu-ye Pain (Persian: رادوپايين, also Romanized as Rādū-ye Pā’īn; also known as Rādān, Rādow, and Rādū) is a village in Polan Rural District, Polan District, Chabahar County, Sistan and Baluchestan Province, Iran. At the 2006 census, its population was 121, in 23 families.
