= Anton Matveyenko (footballer, born 1989) =

Belarusian footballer

Personal information
- Full name: Anton Viktorovich Matveyenko
- Date of birth: 28 April 1989 (age 37)
- Place of birth: Gomel, Belarusian SSR
- Height: 1.80 m (5 ft 11 in)
- Position: Defender

Youth career
- 2004–2008: Gomel

Senior career*
Years	Team	Apps	(Gls)
2008–2010	Gomel	30	(1)
2012	DSK Gomel	21	(1)
2013	Lida	12	(2)

International career
2008–2010	Belarus U21	10	(1)
- * Club domestic league appearances and goals as of 2 January 2014

Anton Matveyenko (Belarusian: Антон Мацвеенка; Russian: Антон Матвеенко; born 28 April 1989) is a retired Belarusian professional footballer.
