= Radan =

Radan may refer to:

- Radan (mountain) mountain in southern Serbia
- Radan, Iran (disambiguation), villages in Iran
- FK Radan Lebane, a Serbian football club based in Lebane, Serbia

== Persons with the given name ==
- Radan Lenc (born 1991), Czech ice hockey player
- Radan Šunjevarić (born 1983), Serbian footballer
- Radan Kanev (born 1975), Bulgarian Member of the European Parliament

== Persons with the surname ==
- Ahmad-Reza Radan, Iranian police chief
- Bahram Radan (born 1979), Iranian actor
- Jelena Radan (born 1974), Croatian singer and songwriter
