= Przemysław Kulig =

Polish footballer

Personal information
- Date of birth: 8 October 1980 (age 46)
- Place of birth: Mrągowo, Poland
- Height: 1.81 m (5 ft 11 in)
- Position: Defender

Team information
- Current team: Żagiel Piecki (player-manager)
- Number: 7

Senior career*
Years	Team	Apps	(Gls)
- Darz Bór Dobry Lasek
1998–1999	Mrągowia Mrągowo		
1999	Warmia/Stomil II Olsztyn		
1999–2000	Mrągowia Mrągowo		
2000–2001	Jeziorak Iława		
2001–2006	Jagiellonia Białystok		
2006–2007	Górnik Łęczna	41	(2)
2007–2012	Cracovia	49	(4)
2009–2010	→ Górnik Zabrze (loan)	16	(1)
2013–2016	Mrągowia Mrągowo		
2016–2019	Żagiel Piecki		
2024–	Żagiel Piecki	11	(2)

Managerial career
- 2023–: Żagiel Piecki (player-manager)
- * Club domestic league appearances and goals as of 28 September 2024

Przemysław Kulig (born 8 October 1980) is a Polish football manager and player who plays as a defender. He is currently the player-manager of Żagiel Piecki.

== Honours ==
Żagiel Piecki

- Klasa A Warmia-Masuria I: 2016–17
