= Dzmitry Yuzvovich =

Belarusian footballer

Personal information
- Date of birth: 25 January 1989 (age 37)
- Place of birth: Slonim, Belarusian SSR
- Height: 1.84 m (6 ft 1/2 in)
- Position: Forward

Youth career
- 2006–2008: MTZ-RIPO Minsk

Senior career*
Years	Team	Apps	(Gls)
2006	PMC Postavy	28	(7)
2007–2008	MTZ-RIPO Minsk	0	(0)
2008–2009	Neman Grodno	11	(1)
2010–2011	Partizan Minsk	30	(2)
2012	Neman Grodno	0	(0)
2012	→ Smorgon (loan)	8	(1)
2013	Baranovichi	8	(4)
2013–2015	Slonim	48	(14)
2015	Smolevichi-STI	8	(0)

International career
2009–2010	Belarus U21	7	(2)
- * Club domestic league appearances and goals

Dzmitry Yuzvovich (Belarusian: Дзмітрый Юзвовіч; Russian: Дмитрий Юзвович; born 25 January 1989) is a Belarusian former professional footballer.
