= Radomir Kuzmanović =

Serbian politician (born 1963)

Radomir Kuzmanović (Serbian Cyrillic: Радомир Кузмановић; born 1963) is a politician in Serbia. He served in the Assembly of Vojvodina from 2014 to 2020 and is now a member of the Sombor city assembly. Kuzmanović is a member of the Serbian Progressive Party.

== Private career ==
Kuzmanović is a forestry technician.

== Politician ==
=== Municipal politics ===
Kuzmanović began his political career as a member of the far-right Serbian Radical Party. He received the seventh position on the party's electoral list for the Sombor municipal assembly in the 2008 Serbian local elections and was given a mandate when the list won twenty-three out of sixty-one mandates, finishing second against the Democratic Party. (Between 2000 and 2011, mandates in Serbian elections held under proportional representation were awarded to parties and coalitions rather than individual candidates, and it was common practice for the mandates to be assigned out of numerical order. Kuzmanović did not automatically receive a mandate by virtue of his list position.)

The Radical Party experienced a serious split later in 2008, with several members joining the more moderate Progressive Party under the leadership of Tomislav Nikolić and Aleksandar Vučić. Kuzmanović sided with the Progressives.

Serbia's electoral system was reformed in 2011, such that mandates were awarded in numerical order to candidates on successful lists. Kuzmanović received the fourth position on the Progressive Party's list in Sombor and was re-elected when the list won eleven mandates. He served as leader of the Progressive Party group in the sitting of the assembly that followed. In May 2015, Radio Television of Vojvodina reported that Kuzmanović was involved in a fight in Sombor that left a young man seriously injured. Kuzmanović rejected this account, saying that the young man was intoxicated and acting aggressively at a public event, and that he himself had been injured when he tried to stop the situation from escalating.

He did not seek re-election at the local level in 2016. He did, however, receive the nineteenth position on the Progressive list in the 2020 local elections and was returned to the assembly when the list won a majority victory with thirty-nine mandates. He is now the chair of the city committee for urbanism, construction, and housing and communal services.

=== Assembly of Vojvodina ===
Kuzmanović was given the sixteenth position on the Progressive Party's list in the 2012 Vojvodina provincial election, which was held under a system of mixed proportional representation. The list won fourteen mandates; Kuzmanović was not immediately elected but received a mandate on 28 October 2014 as a replacement for another party member. The election was won by the Democratic Party and its allies, and the Progressives served in opposition during this sitting of the assembly.

Vojvodina subsequently switched to a system of full proportional representation. Kuzmanović was given the twenty-seventh position on the Progressive list in the 2016 provincial election and was re-elected when the list won a majority victory with sixty-three out of 120 mandates. He did not seek re-election at the provincial level in 2020.
