= Radosław Pindiur =

Canadian-Polish footballer

Personal information
- Full name: Radosław Pindiur
- Date of birth: 29 January 1988 (age 38)
- Place of birth: Mrągowo, Poland
- Height: 1.78 m (5 ft 10 in)
- Position: Defender

Team information
- Current team: Stal Poniatowa
- Number: 4

Youth career
- 2004–2006: York Jets
- 2006–2007: Wisła Kraków

Senior career*
Years	Team	Apps	(Gls)
2007–present	Wisła Kraków (MESA)	15	(0)
2007–2008	Wisła Kraków	2	(0)
2009	→ Stal Poniatowa (loan)	10	(0)
2009–	Świt Krzeszowice		
- * Club domestic league appearances and goals as of June 5, 2009

Radosław Pindiur (born January 29, 1988, in Morąg), is a Canadian-Polish footballer who plays for Świt Krzeszowice.

== Career ==
Pindiur began his career in Canada with York Jets and was than scouted from Wisła Kraków, in Winter 2009 was loaned out to Stal Poniatowa, he went than on 14 July 2009 on trial to OKS 1945 Olsztyn.

== Personal life ==
He was born in Mrągowo, at the age of 9 moved with his family to Toronto, Canada. At age 16 went back to Poland, this time Kraków to play for Wisła Kraków SSA. Earned bachelor's degree from physical education at Wszechnica Świętokrzyska in Kielce and currently studies International Business at the Kraków University of Economics.
