= Brod (Crna Trava) =

Brod Брод (Serbian)
- Village
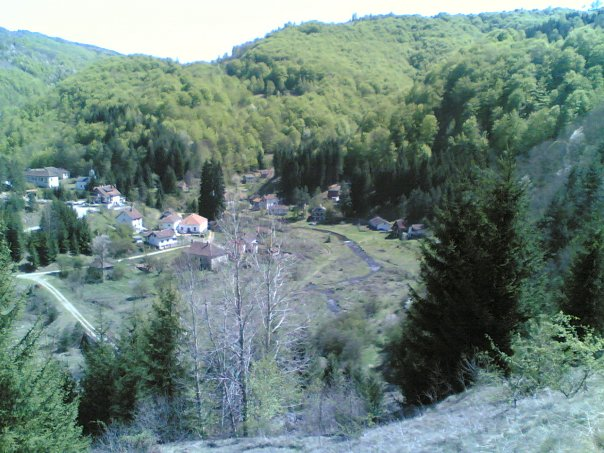
- A view of the village.

- Location within Serbia
- Coordinates: 42°50′57″N 22°17′06″E
- Country: Serbia
- District: Jablanica District
- Municipality: Crna Trava

Population (2002)
  - Total: 122
- Time zone: UTC+1 (CET)
  - Summer (DST): UTC+2 (CEST)

Brod (Serbian Cyrillic: Брод) is a village in the municipality of Crna Trava, Serbia. According to the 2002 census, the village has a population of 122 people.

== Gallery ==
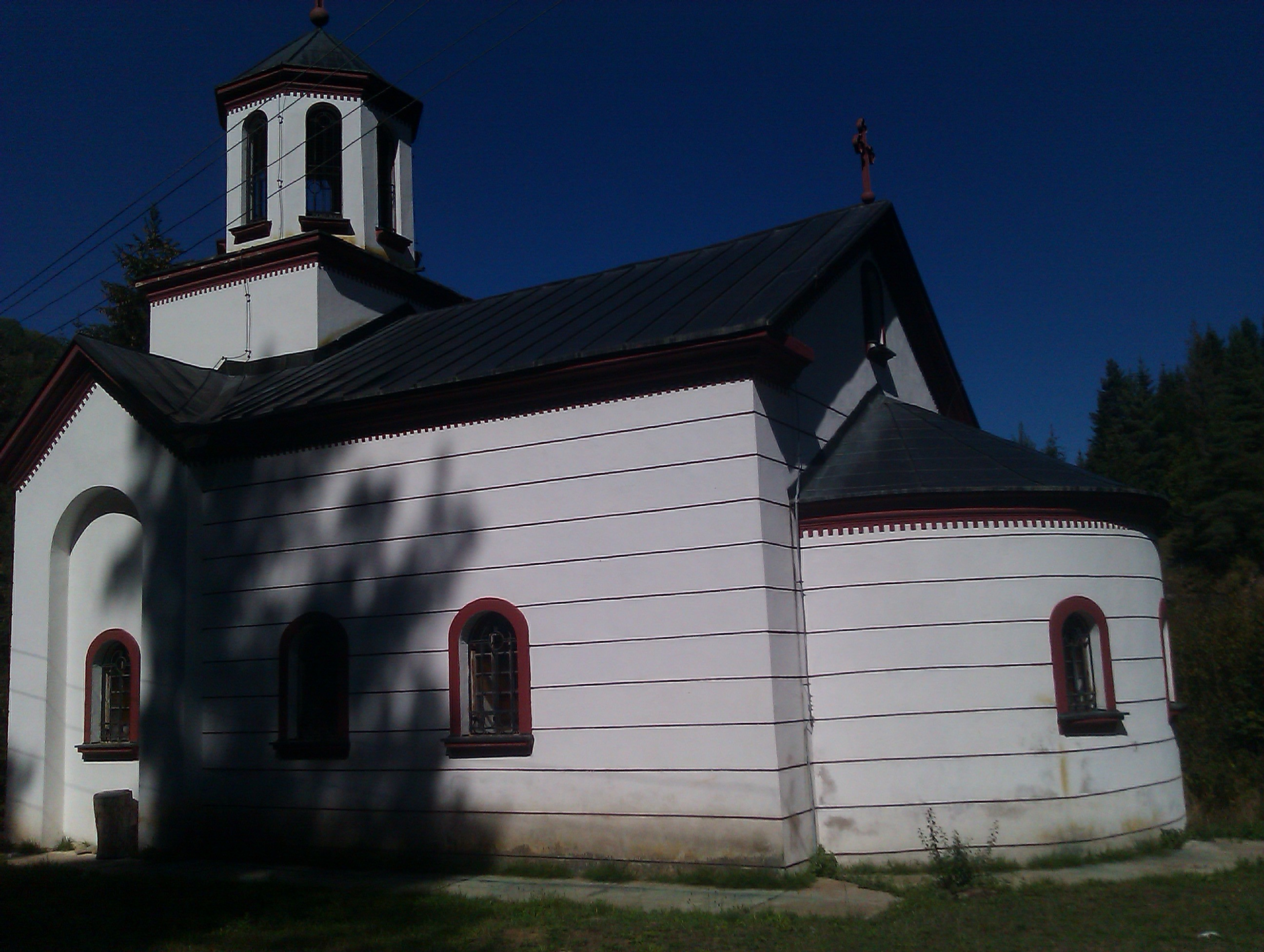
Orthodox church.

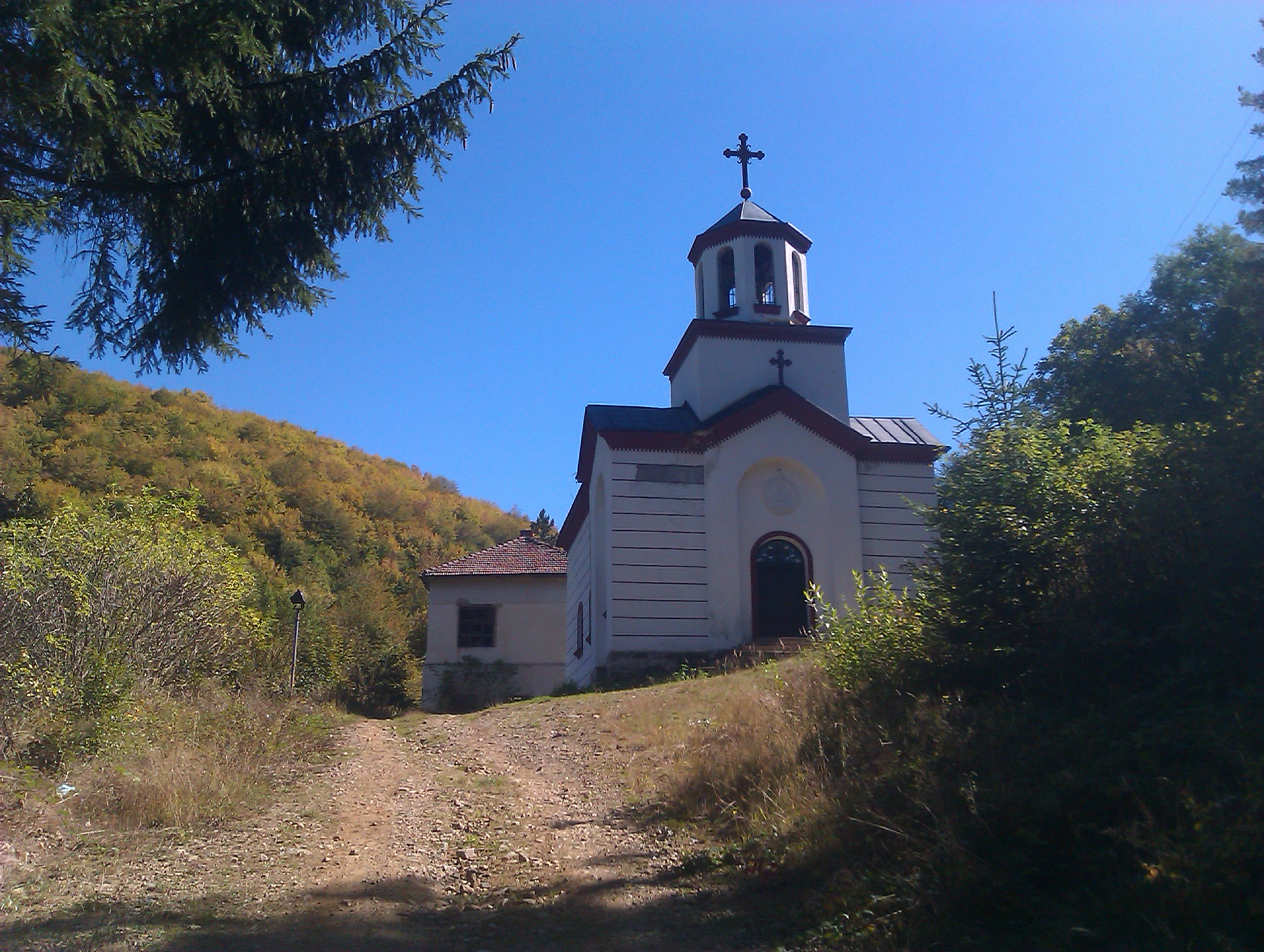
Orthodox church.
