= Radoslav Boychev =

Bulgarian politician

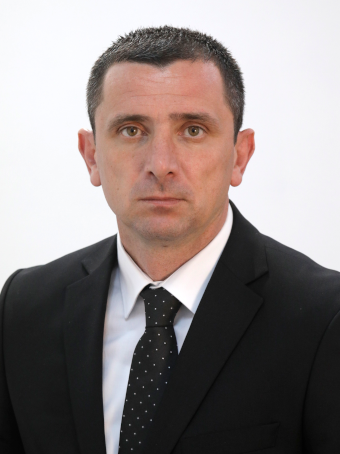

Member of Bulgarian National Assembly

Personal details
- Born: 1 January 1981 (age 45) Ihtiman, Bulgaria
- Education: Academy of the Ministry of Interior; Nikola Vaptsarov Naval Academy
- Occupation: Politician

Radoslav Nikolov Boychev (born 1 January 1981) is a Bulgarian politician, member of the parliamentary group of There is Such a People in the XLVI National Assembly. He was an operative officer in the State Security Service.

== Biography ==
Radoslav Boychev was born on 1 January 1981 in Ihtiman, People's Republic of Bulgaria. He completed his secondary education at the Technical School of Economics in Targovishte, majoring in Accounting and Control. After his secondary education, he graduated from several universities in the field of security: He graduated from the Academy of the Ministry of Interior, after which he obtained a master's degree in National Security and continued his studies in a second master's programme - Logistics at the Higher Naval School "Nikola Vaptsarov Naval Academy", Varna.

From 2003 to 2010 he was an employee of the Territorial Unit "Fight against Organized Crime" at the General Directorate for Combating Organized Crime of the Ministry of the Interior, Terror Group. In 2010, he started working as a security and human resources expert in a large local company.

== Political career ==
Radoslav Boychev became a member of There is Such a People and was elected regional coordinator of the party in Targovishte. By November 2022.

At the parliamentary elections in April 2021 he is the leader of the ITN list for the 28th MMC – Targovishte.

At the parliamentary elections in July 2021 he was the leader of the ITN list for the 28th MMC – Targovishte. He was part of the Committee on Internal Security and Public Order and took part in the parliamentary scrutiny of issues concerning the activities of state-owned enterprises in the Targovishte region with the Ministry of Agriculture, Food and Forestry as the principal.

In the parliamentary elections in November 2021, he was the leader of the ITN list in the 28th MMC – Targovishte.

In the 2022 parliamentary elections, he is second on the ITN list for the 28th MMC – Targovishte.

At the local elections in 2023 he is a candidate for mayor of the municipality of Targovishte, nominated by an initiative committee supported by the local structures of Revival and BSP.
