= Radosław Kursa =

Polish footballer

Personal information
- Full name: Radosław Kursa
- Date of birth: 12 January 1989 (age 37)
- Place of birth: Puławy, Poland
- Height: 1.91 m (6 ft 3 in)
- Position: Defender

Team information
- Current team: Hetman Gołąb
- Number: 3

Youth career
- 2004: Lublinianka

Senior career*
Years	Team	Apps	(Gls)
2005	LKS Bałucz		
2005–2006	UKS SMS Łódź		
2006	UKS SMS Bałucz		
2007–2011	Widzew Łódź	5	(0)
2009–2010	→ Motor Lublin (loan)	14	(0)
2011–2012	Wisła Płock	7	(0)
2012–2013	Motor Lublin	40	(2)
2013–2015	Zagłębie Sosnowiec	40	(3)
2015	→ Lublinianka (loan)	14	(1)
2015–2016	MKS Kluczbork	19	(0)
2017–2018	Motor Lublin	20	(4)
2018–2021	Orlęta Radzyń Podlaski	68	(3)
2021–2022	Świdniczanka Świdnik	43	(7)
2022–2023	Powiślak Końskowola	24	(2)
2023–	Hetman Gołąb	8	(3)

International career
2008	Poland U19	1	(0)
- * Club domestic league appearances and goals as of 22:35, 24 June 2025 (UTC)

Radosław Kursa (born 12 January 1989) is a Polish professional footballer who plays as a defender for regional league club Hetman Gołąb.

== Career ==
In July 2009, he was loaned to Motor Lublin on a one-year deal.

In February 2011, he was loaned to Wisła Płock on a half-year deal.

On 19 January 2017, Kursa signed a one-and-a-half-year contract with III liga club Motor Lublin.

== Honours ==
Świdniczanka Świdnik

- IV liga Lublin: 2021–22
