= Alessandro Morbidelli (footballer) =

Italian footballer (born 1989)

Personal information
- Full name: Alessandro Morbidelli
- Date of birth: March 31, 1989 (age 37)
- Place of birth: Rome, Italy
- Height: 1.75 m (5 ft 9 in)
- Position: Forward

Senior career*
Years	Team	Apps	(Gls)
2006–2010	Cisco Roma	35	(3)
2010–2011	Pomezia	27	(2)
- * Club domestic league appearances and goals as of 17:35, 6 January 2012 (UTC)

Alessandro Morbidelli (born 31 March 1989) is an Italian footballer who played as a forward. He played for Italian Serie C2 teams A.S. Cisco Calcio Roma and Pomezia Calcio.
