= Dragutin Anastasijević =

Serbian Byzantinist and philologist (1877–1950)

- Born: 30 July 1877; Kragujevac
- Died: 20 August 1950 (aged 73); Belgrade
- Occupations: byzantinist and philologist
- Known for: being a governor of Durrës County

Dragutin Anastasijević (Kragujevac, 30 July 1877 – Belgrade, 20 August 1950) was a Serbian byzantinist and philologist, a member of Serbian Academy of Sciences and Arts.

== Biography ==
Anastasijević completed gymnasium in Belgrade and in 1900 graduated from the Velika škola in Belgrade in classical philology and Byzantine Studies. At professor Božidar Prokić's recommendation he continued to pursue Byzantine Studies and modern Greek philology in Munich (his mentor was Karl Krumbacher) where he got his PhD in 1905. He was professor of Byzantine studies on University of Belgrade Faculty of Philosophy from 1906.

When the army of Kingdom of Serbia occupied Ottoman Albania in 1912, Anastasijević was engaged as translator for Greek language and after a while he was appointed on position of governor of Durrës County.

He was elected member of Serbian Academy of Sciences and Arts in 1946.

== See also ==
- Stevan Dimitrijević
- Gabriel Millet
- Nikodim Kondakov
- Ljuba Kovačević
- Ljubomir Stojanović
- Vladimir Ćorović
- Alexander Solovyev
