= Alexander Vasiliev (historian) =

Russian historian

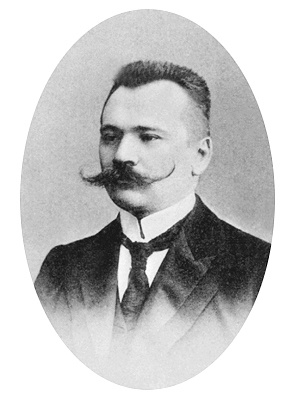
Alexander Vasiliev.

Alexander Alexandrovich Vasiliev (Russian: Алекса́ндр Алекса́ндрович Васи́льев; 4 October [O.S. 22 September] 1867 – 30 May 1953) was a Russian historian. He was considered the foremost authority on Byzantine history and culture in the mid-20th century. His History of the Byzantine Empire (vol. 1–2, 1928) remains one of a few comprehensive accounts of the entire Byzantine history, on the par with those authored by Edward Gibbon and Fyodor Uspensky.

== Biography ==
Vasiliev was born in Saint Petersburg. He studied under one of the earliest professional Byzantinists, Vasily Vasilievsky, at the University of St Petersburg and later taught Arabic language there. Between 1897 and 1900, he furthered his education in Paris. In 1902, he accompanied Nicholas Marr in his trip to Saint Catherine's Monastery in Sinai.

During his stay at the Tartu University (1904–12), Vasiliev prepared and published a highly influential monograph, Byzantium and the Arabs (1907). He also worked in the Russian Archaeology Institute, established by Fyodor Uspensky in Constantinople. In 1912, he moved to the St Petersburg University as a professor. He was elected to the Russian Academy of Sciences in 1919.

In 1925, during his visit to Paris, Vasiliev was persuaded by Mikhail Rostovtsev to emigrate to the West. It was Rostovtzeff who ensured a position at the University of Wisconsin–Madison for him. Several decades later, Vasiliev moved to work in Dumbarton Oaks. Towards the end of his life, he was elected President of the Nikodim Kondakov Institute in Prague and of the Association Internationale des Études Byzantines.

== Bibliography ==
- Slavs in Greece (1898)
- The Latin Sway in the Levant (1923)
- History of the Byzantine Empire: Vol. 1: Constantine to the Crusades (1925 Russian; 1929 & many more English)
- History of the Byzantine Empire: Vol. 2: From the Crusades to the Fall of the Empire (1935 & many more)
- Byzantium and the Arabs, Vol. 1: Political relations between Byzantines and Arabs during the Amorian Dynasty (1900 Russian, 1935 and 1950 French, as Byzance et les Arabes, Tome I: La Dynastie d'Amorium (820–867))
- Byzantium and the Arabs, Vol. 2: Political relations between Byzantines and Arabs during the Macedonian Dynasty (1900 Russian, 1935 and 1950/1968 French, as Byzance et les Arabes, Tome II: La dynastie macédonienne (867–959), in two parts)
- The Goths in the Crimea (1936)
- "The Opening Stages of the Anglo-Saxon Immigration to Byzantium in the Eleventh Century" in Seminarium Kondakovianum (1937)
- The Russian Attack on Constantinople in 860 (1946)
- The 'Life' of St. Peter of Argos and its Historical Significance (1947)
- The monument of Porphyrius in the Hippodrome at Constantinople (1948, 1967)
- Imperial Porphyry Sarcophagi in Constantinople (1949)
- "The Historical Significance Of the Mosaic of Saint Demetrius at Sassoferrato", Dumbarton Oaks Papers, 5 (1950) p. 29-39
- Justin, the First: An Introduction to the Epoch of Justinian the Great (1950)
- The Second Russian Attack on Constantinople (1951, 1967)
- Hugh Capet Of France And Byzantium (1951)
- The Iconoclastic Edict of the Caliph Yazid II, A. D. 721 (1956, 1967)
- A Survey of Works on Byzantine History
- The Life of St. Theodore of Edessa
- Medieval Ideas of the End of the World: West and East
- Prester John and Russia (1996, ed. W. F. Ryan)
