= Alexander Dmitrev =

Soviet historian professor (1888–1962)

Alexander Dmitrievich Dmitrev (Russian: Александр Дмитриевич Дмитрев; 1888, Kiev – 19/20 September 1962, Rostov-on-Don) was a Soviet historian, researcher of popular movements in the Roman Empire, religious scholar, Doctor of Historical Sciences, and professor.

== Biography ==
Dmitrev was born into a teacher's family. His father was a teacher of the ancient Greek language. In 1909 he entered the historical department of the Kiev Theological Academy. After graduating from the academy in 1913, he was left as a professor scholarship holder at the department of church law and was awarded the degree of Candidate of Theology with the right to obtain a Master's degree in Theology without new oral tests. But instead of staying at the academy, with the permission of the Holy Synod, he was sent as a professor scholarship holder (graduate student) to the Russian Archaeological Institute of Constantinople. Here, under the guidance of the prominent Byzantologist academician Fyodor Uspensky, Dmitrev began to deal with the problems of antiquity and early Byzantium. Alexander Dmitrievich took part in scientific expeditions of the institute to Syria, Asia Minor, and Greece.

== Career ==
After returning from Istanbul, Dmitrev settled in Odessa, where he taught at gymnasiums, and after October 1917, at Soviet schools. At the same time he was an instructor of Public Education in the Odessa okrug. In 1922, Alexander Dmitrievich moved to Kiev. There he worked as an instructor of the Water Transport Administration, lecturer in university training courses, and an instructor in Public Education. In 1929, Dmitrev became a researcher at the Byzantological Commission of the Ukrainian Academy of Sciences. He prepared an annotated bibliography and developed a number of topics on the socio-economic history of Byzantium. At the same time, Dmitrev began literary anti-religious work in Moscow publishing houses. In 1929, the first printed work of Dmitrev was published, devoted to the question of the historicity of Christ. At this time, he wrote several deep works on anti-religious topics, based on a wide source base. In 1932, he moved to Moscow and became a researcher at the Moscow Regional Archival Administration and the Moscow Historical Library. A kind of tribute to the history of his native Ukraine was the publication of three brochures on the class struggle in Ukraine in the 17th to 18th centuries. In 1936, the People's Commissariat for Education sent Dmitrev to become an assistant professor at the Stalingrad Pedagogical Institute, where he was elected head of the department of the history of the ancient world and the Middle Ages. In this position, he worked until the evacuation of the institute in 1942. During the evacuation, Dmitrev lost all his property, including his personal library, about which he lamented until the end of his life. In evacuation, he worked in Buguruslan as an assistant professor of the Department of Ancient History at the Teacher Institute. Here Dmitrev completed work on his Candidate of Sciences thesis and defended it in 1943 at the Leningrad State University, which at that time was evacuated to Saratov. In the same year, he transferred to work at the Saratov Pedagogical Institute, but the very next year the People's Commissariat of Education sent him to work in Nalchik at the Kabarda Pedagogical Institute. After working a year in Nalchik, in 1945, he moved to Rostov-on-Don, but again a year later in 1946 he was seconded to the University of Chernivtsi by the order of the Ministry of Higher Education as head of the department. In the 1940s, in the Journal of Ancient History, a whole series of his publications appeared on the social movements of bagaudae, bucolics, agonistici, etc. In the period from 1943 to 1950, Dmitrev worked on his doctoral dissertation on the topic «Social Movements in the Roman Empire in Connection with the Invasion of the Barbarians» (Russian: «Социальные движения в Римской империи в связи с вторжением варваров»). On 27 March 1950, at the Academic Council of Leningrad State University, he defended his doctoral dissertation. Dmitrev knew, besides the ancient Greek and Latin languages, English, German and French, not to mention his native Ukrainian. Dmitrev actively participated in the preparation of the second edition of the Great Soviet Encyclopedia: he wrote more than a dozen articles on the history of Rome. In July 1951, Dmitrev moved to Rostov-on-Don and was elected head of the Department of General History of Rostov State University and became the first and at the same time the only professor at the university. In 1960, he was already seriously ill with cancer and therefore resigned as head of the department. Before his death, he was bedridden. Dmitrev is buried in the Brethren Cemetery.

== Work ==
List of Scientific Works:

=== Books ===
- «Вопрос об историчности христа в свете археологии» («The Question of the Historicity of Christ in the Light of Archeology»)/ А. Дмитриев. - 2-е изд., доп. - [Москва] : Атеист, [1930]. - 32 с., 7 с. ил.; 25 см.
- «Церковь и идея самодержавия в России» («Church and the Idea of Tsarist Autocracy in Russia») / А. Дмитрев. - Рязань : Атеист, 1930. - 231, [1] с.; 25 см.
- «Церковь и крестьянство на Руси» («Church and Peasantry in Russia») / А. Дмитрев; Центр. совет союза воинствующих безбожников СССР. - Москва; Ленинград : Московский рабочий, 1931 (Рязань). - 63 с.; 23 см.
- «Личность девы Марии в свете археологии» («Personality of the Virgin Mary in the Light of Archeology») / А. Дмитрев; Центр. совет Союза воинств. безбожников СССР. - Москва : Безбожник, 1931 (Вологда : тип. "Северный печатник"). - 73 с. : ил.; 26х17 см.
- «Петр I и церковь» («Peter I and the Church») / А. Дмитрев; Центральный совет союза воинствующих безбожников СССР. - Москва : ОГИЗ; Ленинград : Московский рабочий; 1931. - 88 с.; 22 см.
- «Подготовка интервенции против СССР и церковь» («Preparation of Intervention Against the USSR and the Church») / А. Дмитрев; Центр. совет Союза воинст. безбожников СССР. - Москва : Гос. антирелигиоз. изд-во, 1932. - 54 с.; 23 см.
- «Кровавый навет и христианская церковь» («Blood Libel and the Christian Church») / А. Дмитрев; Центр. совет Союза воинств. безбожников СССР. - Москва : Гос. антирелигиозное изд-во, 1932 (тип. "Гудок"). - Обл., 70, [2] с., включ. т. л.; 20х13 см.
- «Колиивщина» («Koliyivshchyna»): [Из истории классовой борьбы на Украине во второй половине XVIII века] / А. Дмитрев. - Москва : Изд-во политкаторжан, 1934. - 43 с.; 17 см. - (Дешевая историко-революционная библиотека/ Под общей ред. И. А. Теодоровича; 1934 г. No. 4);
- «Хмельничина» («Khmelʹnychyna») : (Из истории классовой борьбы на Украине в 1 половине XVII века) / А. Дмитрев. - Москва : Изд-во Всес. о-ва политкаторжан и ссыльно-поселенцев, [1934] (11 тип. Мособлполиграфа). - Обл., 64 с. : ил.; 17х13 см. - (Дешевая историко-революционная библиотека/ Под общей ред. И. А. Теодоровича; 1934. No. 7).
- «Гайдамачина» («Haidamachina») : (Из истории классовой борьбы на Украине в 1-й половине XVIII в.) / А. Дмитрев. - Москва : изд-во политкаторжан, 1934. - 54 с.; 17 см. - (Дешевая историко-революционная библиотека/ Под общей ред. И. А. Теодоровича; 1934. No. 3)
- «Инквизиция в России» («Inquisition in Russia») /А. Д. Дмитрев. - Москва : ГАИЗ, 1937 (17 ф-ка нац. книги треста "Полиграфкнига"). - Обл., 148 с.; 19х13 см.

=== Articles ===
==== in the Journal of Ancient History ====
- Движение багаудов (The Movement of Bagaudae) / p. 101–114 / 1940. № 3–4 (12–13)
- Буколы (из истории аграрного движения в Римском Египте) (Bucolics (from the History of the Agrarian Movement in Roman Egypt)) / p. 92–100 / 1946. № 4 (18)
- К вопросу об агонистиках и циркумцеллионах (To the Question of Agonistici and Circumcellions) / p. 66–78 / 1948. № 3 (25)
- Падение Дакии (к вопросу о связи освободительных движений в Римской империи с вторжениями варваров) (The Fall of Dacia (on the Connection between the Liberation Movements in the Roman Empire and the Invasions of the Barbarians))/ p. 76–85 / 1949. № 1 (27)
- Восстание вестготов на Дунае и революция рабов (The Visigoth Uprising on the Danube and the Slave Revolution) / p. 66–80 / 1950. № 1 (31)
- Движение latrones как одна из форм классовой борьбы в Римской империи (The Movement of Latrones as a Form of Class Struggle in the Roman Empire) / p. 61–72 / 1951. № 4 (38)

==== in the Vizantiyskiy Vremennik ====
- Движение скамаров (The Movement of Scamarae) / Том 5 (30) / p. 5–14
- Народные движения в восточных провинциях в период дунайских войн III в. (236–278 гг.) (Popular Movements in the Eastern Provinces During the Danube Wars of the 3rd Century (236–278 Years)) / Том 8 (33) / 97–126
