= Gabriel Millet =

French archaeologist and historian (1867–1953)

- Born: 17 April 1867; Saint-Louis du Sénégal
- Died: 8 May 1953 (aged 86); Paris
- Occupations: Archaeologist; Historian

Gabriel Millet (French: [ɡabʁijɛl mijɛ]; 17 April 1867 – 8 May 1953) was a French archaeologist and historian.

== Biography ==
After he passed his agrégation of history in 1891, Gabriel Millet became a member of the French School at Athens, then director of the École pratique des hautes études in religious sciences in 1899, and professor at the Collège de France in 1927.

A voyager, he travelled throughout Europe, Greece, Macedonia, the Balkans. In 1906 Gabriel Millet, Vladimir Petković and Josef Strzygowski began research on Serbian painting, which they "acclaimed it to be among the finest creations of medieval Europe". After the trip he wrote books, including his university thesis, on the findings of his research in Serbia.

Millet was the author of numerous books on Byzantine art. In 1930, in collaboration with Louis Bréhier, he led an archaeological mission to Mount Athos. He founded the series "Archives d'Athos" at the College de France, under the patronage of the Academie des Inscriptions et Belles-Lettres and the Academy of Athens. Later, Gabriel Millet led two more Serbian archaeological missions of 1934 and 1935, sponsored by the French Government in collaboration with the Kingdom of Yugoslavia. All practical difficulties such as transportation, supplies, scaffolding, were ironed out in that journey thanks to the energy and kindness of his long-time friends, professor of art Đurađ Bošković, his wife and colleagues, including Vladimir Petković and Milan Kašanin.

== See also ==
- Milan Kašanin
- Vladimir Petković
- Đurađ Bošković
- Stevan Dimitrijević
- Nikodim Kondakov
- Ljuba Kovačević
- Ljubomir Stojanović
- Vladimir Ćorović
- Alexander Solovyev
