= Gradimir =

Slavic masculine given name

- Gender: masculine

Origin
- Language: Slavic

Other names
- Related names: Gradislav

Gradimir (Cyrillic: Градимир) is a Serbian masculine given name of Slavic origin.

Notable people with the name include:

- Gradimir Crnogorac (born 1982), Bosnian footballer
- Gradimir Gojer (born 1951), Bosnian writer and theater director and writer
- Gradimir Milovanović (born 1948), Serbian mathematician
- Gradimir Smudja (born 1956), Serbian comic artist
