= Milan Kašanin =

Serbian art historian, art critic, curator and writer

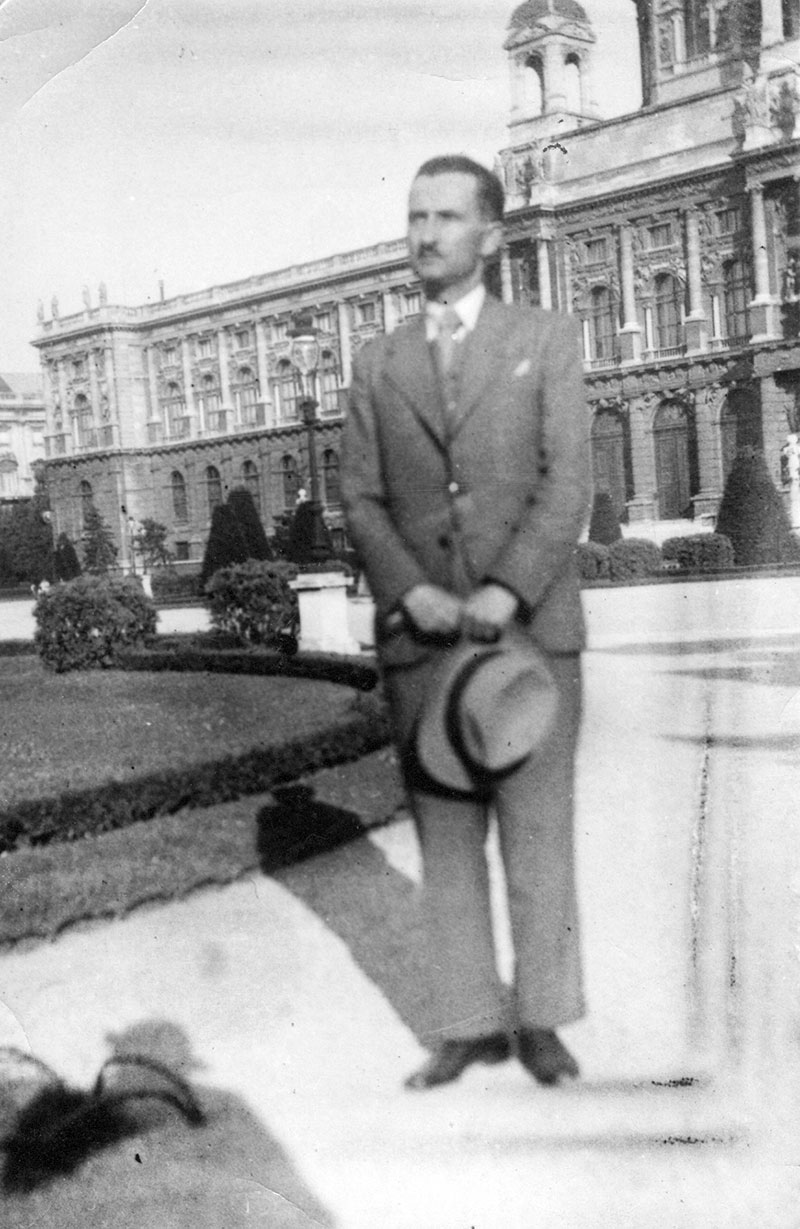
- Kašanin in front of the Kunsthistorisches Museum, c. 1923
- Born: 21 February 1895; Beli Manastir, Austria-Hungary
- Died: 22 November 1981 (aged 86); Belgrade, SFR Yugoslavia
- Education: Sorbonne University
- Occupations: Art historian, writer
- Awards: Legion of Honour

Milan Kašanin (Serbian Cyrillic: Милан Кашанин; 21 February 1895 – 22 November 1981) was a Serbian art historian, art critic, curator and writer. He served as the head of three Belgrade based museums, the Museum of Prince Pavle (the modern-day National Museum of Serbia), the Museum of Contemporary Art and the Gallery of Frescoes.

== Biography ==
Of humble origins, Kašanin adopted his mother's surname because he was born out of wedlock. Granted a scholarship, he studied art history at the Sorbonne. With the dissertation Bela crkva Karanska (The White Church of Karan), Kašanin obtained his PhD from the University of Belgrade in 1926. He was curator at the Museum of Contemporary Art, director of the Museum of Prince Pavle (the modern-day National Museum of Serbia) and the Gallery of Frescoes in Belgrade. He is also known as one of the organizers of some of the first major European art exhibitions in Belgrade, The Italian Portrait Through the Ages, in 1938, and French Painting of the 19th Century one year later. Apart from organizing foreign exhibitions in Yugoslavia, he also organized exhibits of Serbian frescoes and other art in many European capitals, as well as in South America.

Kašanin was the founder and editor of the magazine Umetnički pregled (Art Review), which was published between 1937 and 1941. He served as the head of the Museum of Prince Pavle between 1935 and 1944. In order to compile the art collection of the Museum of Prince Pavle, Kašanin traveled through Europe and stayed in the Netherlands, among other places. His travel reports, first published in newspapers and later also in the anthology Pronađeni predmeti (Lost Objects) (1962), are a testimony to this. The organization of the exhibitions of both Yugoslav art in Amsterdam and Dutch art in Belgrade is also attributed to Kašanin; for this, the Dutch Government bestowed him with a state decoration. As part of his scientific work, he researches Serbian art from the Middle Ages to the modern era. His interpretations are based on insights gained by the French research school of the interwar period and are written in a refined style and with a thorough analysis. It also brought him into the company of Serbian artists and collectors such as Milan Konjović and Pavle Beljanski respectively. Kašanin also made a significant contribution to the knowledge of Serbian medieval literature. He began publishing art criticism in 1924 and was published in magazines such as Politika, Vreme and in the magazine Reč i slika. In 1927, he co-authored a book with Veljko Petrović on the contribution of Serbian artists to the visual arts in Vojvodina. He was also noted for his fierce literary criticism.

After World War II, Kašanin fell out of favor with Yugoslavia's new communist government because of his former close ties with Prince Pavle, and struggled to get a job and publish his books. Kašanin had four children, three sons and a daughter. His brother Radivoje Kašanin was an accomplished mathematician and academic, while some of his friends included the fellow art historian Kenneth Clark, and Serbian writers such as Isidora Sekulić, Anica Savić Rebac, and Ivo Andrić. His collected works were published in 2002 with a total of eight volumes. Kašanin was a recipient of the Order of St Sava (I, III and V degree), the Order of the Yugoslav Crown, the French Legion of Honour, the Order of Orange-Nassau (III degree), the Danish Order (III degree), the Order of Polonia Restituta (III degree), and an Italian order. A street in Belgrade is named after him.

== Works ==
- Jutrenja i bdenja, Belgrade, 1925, 1926.
- Srpska umetnost u Vojvodini, co-author with Veljko Petrović, Novi Sad, 1927.
- Zaljubljenici, Belgrade, 1928.
- Bela crkva Karanska: Njena istorija, arhitektura i životopis, Belgrade, 1928.
- Sabrana dela I-II, Belgrade, 1929–1932.
- Trokošuljnik, roman, Belgrade, 1930.
- Pijana zemlja I, II, Belgrade, 1932.
- Jugoslavische hedengasche beldenge kunst, Amsterdam, 1935.
- Srpska umetnost u Vojvodini do velike seobe, Novi Sad, 1939.
- L' art yougoslave des nos origines a nos jours, Belgrade, 1939.
- Dva veka srpskog slikarstva, Belgrade, 1942.
- Umetnost i umetnici, Belgrade, 1943.
- Između orla i Vuka, essay, Belgrade, 1953.
- Savremeni beogradski umetnici. Reprodukcije, Belgrade, 1953.
- U senci slave, Novi Sad, 1961.
- Pronađene stvari, Belgrade, 1961.
- Umetničke kritike, Belgrade, 1968.
- Sudbine i ljudi, Belgrade, 1968.
- Susreti i pisma, Novi Sad, 1974.
- Srpska književnost u srednjem veku, Belgrade, 1975.
- Slučajna otkrića, Novi Sad, 1977.
- Izabrani eseji, Belgrade, 1977.
- Pogledi i misli, Novi Sad, 1978.
- Kamena otkrića, Belgrade, 1978.
- Priviđenja I, Novi Sad, 1981.
- Milan Kašanin, Svetislav Marić: Prepiska dvojice mladića, Novi Sad, 1991.
- Gradovi i dvorci u srednjovekovnoj Srbiji, Belgrade, 2015.

=== Translations ===
- Dostojevski - The Village of Stepanchikovo
- Dostoyevski - Netochka Nezvanova
- Tolstoy - Hadji Murat
- Guy de Maupassant - Ljubimac
- Viktor Zhirmunsky - History of French literature
- Branko Radičević - Selected poems
- Laza Kostić - Diary

== See also ==
- Milan Konjović
- Pavle Beljanski
- Isidora Sekulić
- Svetozar Radojčić
- Vladimir Petković

Cultural offices
Preceded by Vladimir Petković	Director of National Museum of Serbia; 1935–1944	Succeeded by Veljko Petrović
