= Bogdan Gavrilović =

Serbian mathematician and academic (1864–1947)

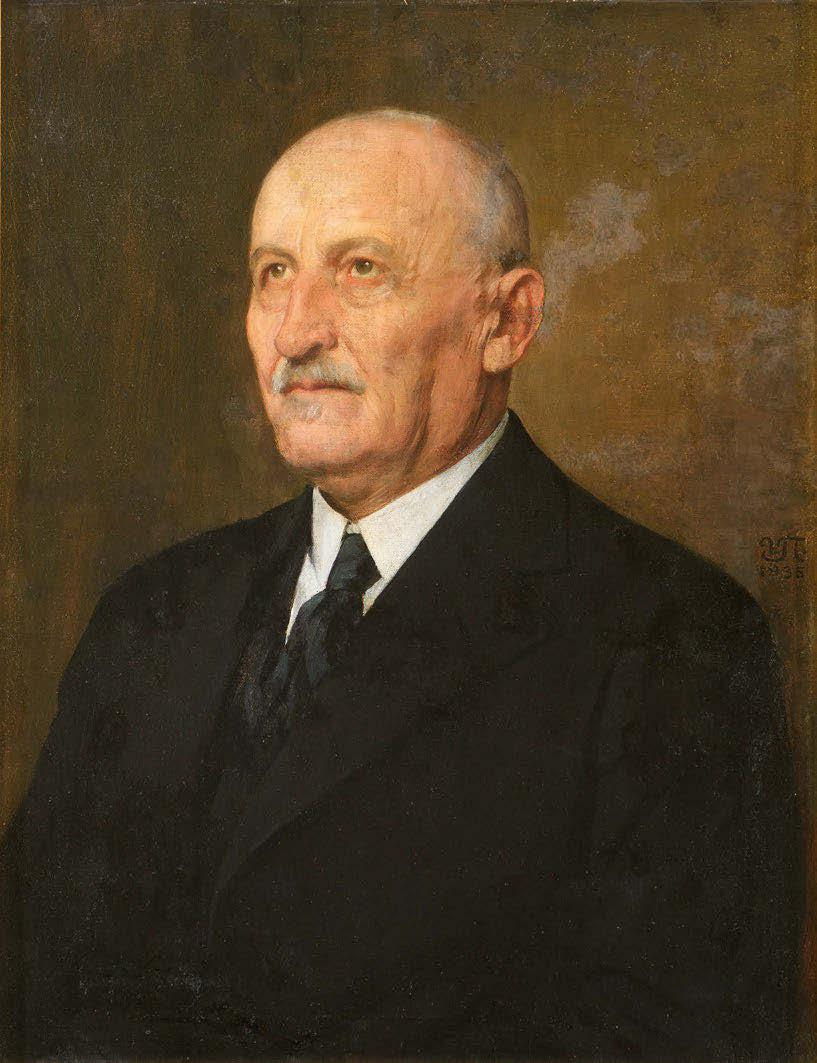
- Gavrilović's portrait, by Uroš Predić
- Born: 1864; Novi Sad, Austrian Empire
- Died: 1947 (aged 82–83); Belgrade, FPR Yugoslavia
- Scientific career
- Fields: Mathematics, Physics and Philosophy

Bogdan Gavrilović (Serbian Cyrillic: Богдан Гавриловић; 1864–1947) was a Serbian mathematician, physicist, university professor and academic. He received his doctorate in sciences mathematiques from the University of Budapest in 1887. He served twice as the Rector of the University of Belgrade and was elected three times as president of the Serbian Royal Academy (1931–1937).

== Biography ==
His family originates from Herzegovina region.

He graduated from high school in Novi Sad as the best student of his generation. After high school, he went to study at the University of Budapest as a scholarship holder of the Serbian benefactor Sava Tekelija. In 1887, he received the title PhD in Mathematics. Gavrilović continued his studies in Western Europe, including Germany, Switzerland, and France. In Berlin, he attended lectures by the German mathematician Karl Weierstrass.

Bogdan Gavrilović started working as a professor at the University of Belgrade. He remained in Belgrade until his death in 1947, and was active as a regular professor of mathematics at the Technical Faculty until 1941.

Towards the end of the nineteenth century, he published two voluminous university textbooks, which also have a monographic character: Analytical Geometry (1896) on 900 pages, and Theory of Determinants (1899) on linear algebra. Both books are considered capital mathematical works in Serbia of their time.

He founded the Mathematical Library in 1894, which was destroyed at the end of World War II. Together with Mihailo Petrović and Milutin Milanković, he is considered responsible for the introduction of modern mathematics in Serbia at the beginning of the 20th century.

Gavrilović was the founder of the "Mathematics Institute" in Belgrade (1946), president of the "Nikola Tesla Society" and the director of the "Nikola Tesla Institute".

Academic Gavrilović was the holder of numerous high scientific and social functions and the recipient of significant awards University of Athens awarded him with dr. hon. causa and he was a member of society Circolo Matematico di Palermo.

In his free time, he would stay at his estate in Grocka, where he spent time with his family and cultivated plums.

== Selected works ==
- Analitična geometrija tačke, prave, kruga i koničnih preseka I-II, 1896
- Teorija determinanata, 1899

== See also ==
- Mihailo Petrović Alas
- Jovan Karamata

Academic offices
Preceded by Sava Urošević	Rector of University of Belgrade; 1910–1913	Succeeded by Slobodan Jovanović
Preceded by Slobodan Jovanović	Rector of University of Belgrade; 1920–1921	Succeeded by Pavle Popović
Preceded by Slobodan Jovanović	President of Serbian Academy of Sciences and Arts; 1931–1937	Succeeded by Aleksandar Belić
