= Jefto Perić =

Serbian painter (1895–1967)

Jefto Perić (Gacko, Bosnia and Herzegovina, then part of the Ottoman Empire, 26 December 1895 – Belgrade, Yugoslavia, 31 March 1967) was a Serbian painter and professor at the Academy of Arts (later to become University of Arts in Belgrade. He is a significant representative of colored realism in Serbian art. Also, he was instrumental in choosing the art in Pavle Beljanski Memorial Collection.

== Biography ==
As a young high school graduate, Jefto Perić went to work as a photographer’s assistant in the studio of Mihailo Merćep in Zagreb. There Perić decided that painting was a career for him. He first attended the Arts and Crafts College, and then at various private art academies in Zagreb where he learned to hone his craft. In Munich his art teachers were Carl Johann Becker-Gundahl (1856-1925) and Hans Hoffmann, and in Paris at the École nationale supérieure des beaux-arts, where his mentor was Paul Signac. He copied the works of the great masters in the Louvre, where he attained superior artistic skills.

It was in Paris that he met Pavle Beljanski and numerous other distinguished Serbian intellectuals from all walks of life. Perić struck a friendship with Beljanski that was to last until the death of the art collector. Between the two world wars Beljanski was working hard on expanding his collection, and in 1935 when Jefto Perić moved back to Belgrade, Beljanski authorized him to choose and buy pieces while he promoted the works of the artists through organizing exhibitions and writing reviews for art magazines.

Perić was a member of ULUS and Lada and a regular participant in the exhibitions of these associations. He exhibited independently in Zagreb in 1927 and in Belgrade in 1936, 1939 and 1951. The concept of the exhibition, in addition to the complex cooperation on the collector-artist relationship, is based on Perić's works created over a long period of time, from the student drawings from 1914 to the late achievements of the mature creator.

== Works ==
- Still-life (1939):
- Flowers (1930):
- Portrait by Jefto Perić of Pavle Beljanski's grandfather:
- City Motif with Bell Tower; Motiv sa Sutjeske; Paysage de Belgrade; Gradski motiv; Studentski trg (Belgrade, c. 1936); Paris; From the Park; and many others.
