= Milan Konjović =

Serbian artist (1898–1993)

Milan Konjović Милан Коњовић
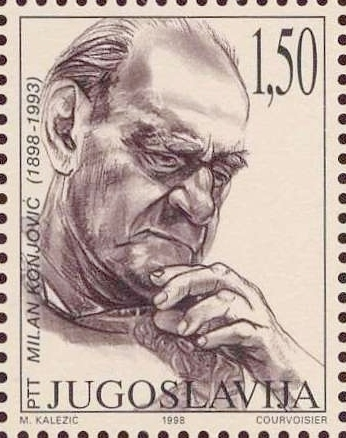
- Milan Konjović on a 1998 Yugoslavian stamp
- Born: 28 January 1898; Sombor, Austrian Empire
- Died: 20 October 1993 (aged 95); Sombor, Yugoslavia
- Education: Academy of Fine Arts, Prague
- Known for: Painting
- Movement: Expressionism
- Website: "Milan Konjovic " Gallery

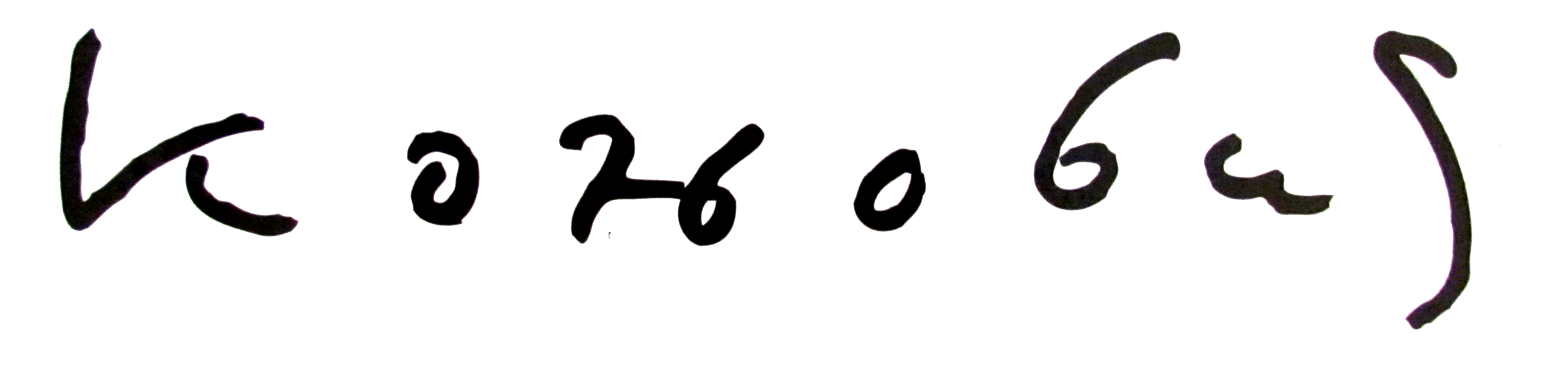
Signature

Milan Konjović (28 January 1898 – 20 October 1993) (Милан Коњовић) was a Serbian painter whose works can be divided into six periods of artistic style. He studied in many countries abroad and lived in Paris from 1924 to 1932. His long life's work earned him many recognitions as well as a place in the Serbian Academy of Sciences and Arts (Srpska akademija nauka i umetnosti, SANU).

== Life ==
Milan Konjović finished elementary and secondary school in Sombor between 1904 and 1916. In 1914 he had his first exhibition featuring some fifty works painted in nature. In 1919 he was admitted to the Academy of Fine Arts in Prague, in the class of Vlaho Bukovac. Having left the academy after the second semester, he continued his education on his own, in Prague where an avant-garde Czech painter Jan Zrzavý introduced him to the art of Leonardo da Vinci. He later brought his studies to Vienna and traveled to German museums in Munich, Berlin, and Dresden.

He arrived in Paris in May 1924 and stayed there until 1932. Afterward, he returned to his native Sombor.

His most significant and successful one-man exhibitions include 1931's "Galerie Bing et Cie", 1932 "Galerie van Leer", and 1937 "Galerie Mouradian-Vallotton." He participated in several Paris Salon exhibitions, marked the beginning of his artistic "blue phase", which lasted from 1929 to 1933. In the later years, he devoted himself to painting his hometown Sombor, its landscape, people and milieu. In summertime he painted in the cities of Dalmatia, including Mlini, Cavtat, and Dubrovnik.

Konjović's "red phase" lasted from 1934 till 1940. In 1941 Konjović was in Osnabrück in a concentration camp as a prisoner of war. After his release, Konjović began painting pastels most notably in the years 1943, 1944, and 1949. He then began producing oil works painted in so-called 'subdued colors' from 1945 to 1952, marking the "gray phase" of his work. 1953 is considered to be the turning point in Konjović's painting style. He works began to be defined by more pure intensive colors and glow, leading to the period dubbed the "coloristic phase." New artistic orientation culminated and was to characterize the works of the "associative phase" (1960–1984). At that time Milan Konjovic engaged himself in the work of the artists' colonies of Vojvodina. In 1985 began the "Byzantine phase" with works treating various themes from Byzantine history.

By the end of 1990 Konjović had produced about thirty new works, completing the impressive opus of about 6000 oil paintings, pastels, watercolors, temperas, drawings, tapestries, stage sets, costume sketches, stained glass windows, mosaics, and graphics. In his life, Konjović had 297 one-man and 700 group exhibitions in the country and abroad, in such notable locations as Prague, New York, London, Amsterdam, São Paulo, Rome, Modena, Athens, Paris, and Moscow.

== Legacy ==
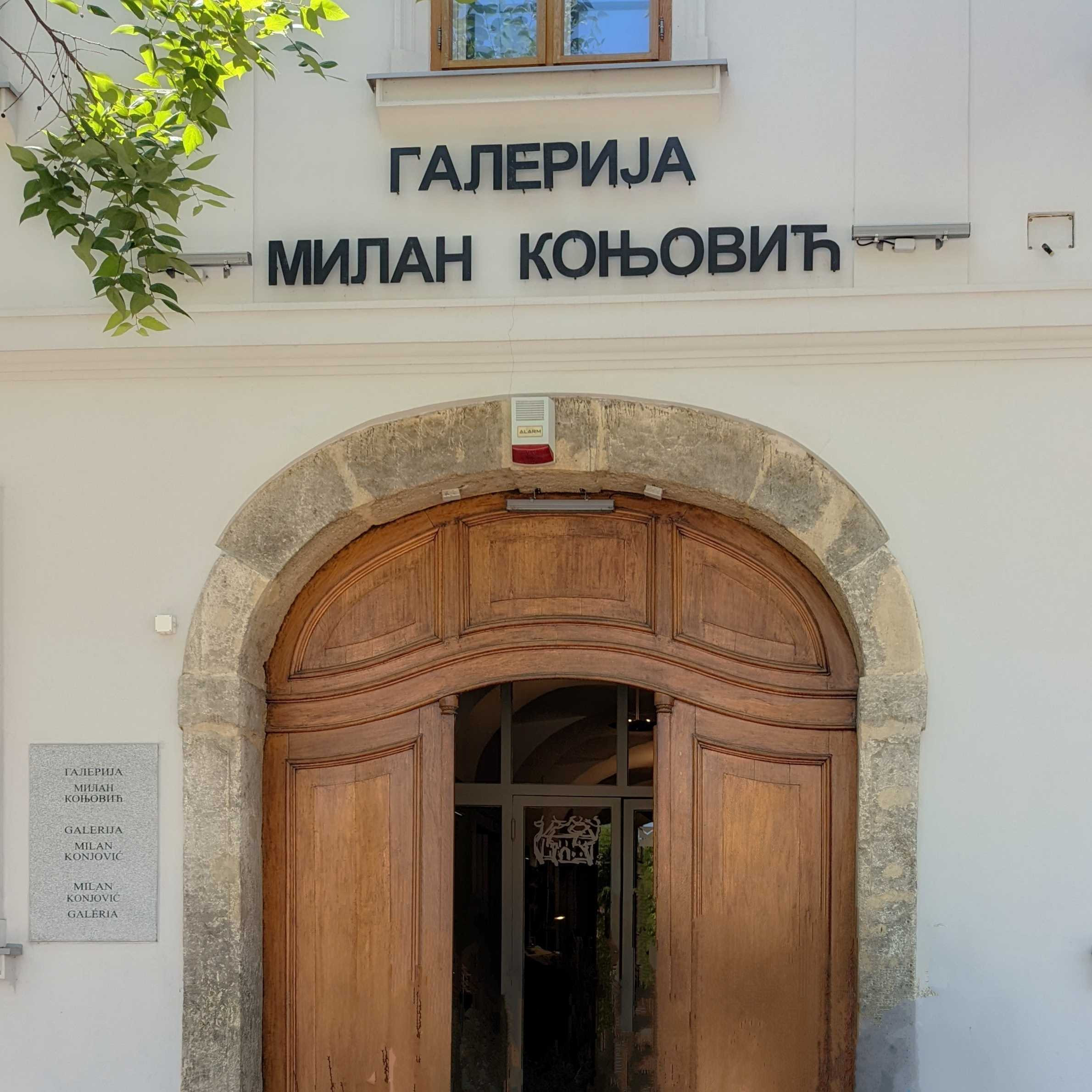
Milan Konjovic Gallery in Sombor

His legacy is best represented in his hometown of Sombor where the "Milan Konjović " Gallery, opened on 10 September 1966, holds about 1060 selected works. In 1979 he was elected a member of Vojvodina Academy of Sciences and Arts. In 1986 he became a corresponding member of Yugoslav Academy of Sciences and Arts, and in 1992 a member of Serbian Academy of Sciences and Arts.

In June 2008, an exhibition of the works by Milan Konjović was opened in the Milan Konjović Gallery in Sombor to commemorate 110 years from the birth of the artist. Entitled "Milan Konjović: In Defence of the Autonomy of Paintings" (Milan Konjović: Odbrana autonomije slike), the exhibition documented Konjović's output in the period of socialist realism, from 1946 until 1951, when "Marxist" art critics vilified and criticised the artist for (among other things) "painting for himself, instead of for the community".

In November–December 2011, several works by Milan Konjović were included in the exhibition of paintings from the Memorial Collection of Pavle Beljanski in the Central Military Club in Belgrade.

Dr Drasko Redjep notes that Konjović became aware of his own artistic worth very early and always maintained high prices of his paintings, but he also donated them with joyful generosity.

== Periods ==
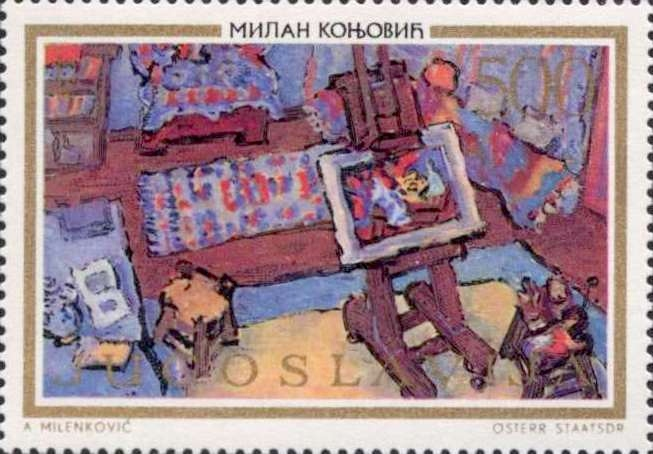
My studio by Konjović on a 1973 Yugoslavian stamp.

The works of Milan Konjovic are usually divided into several phases:

- Early Phase (1913–1928)
- Blue Phase (1929–1933)
- Red Phase (1934–1940)
- Gray Phase (1945–1952)
- Coloristic Phase (1953–1960)
- Associative Phase (1960–1985)
- Byzantine Phase (1985–1990)

== Short note on style ==
Milan Konjovic is described as the greatest Serbian colourist. Dr Drasko Redjep calls him the painter of the wheat fields, vast plains, Sombor's urban views, and Mediterranean holiday scenery, whose works constitute an important reference point.

He is considered to be one of the most significant exponents of Expressionism of colour in Serbian art between two wars.

Konjovic's mature style of painting is characterised by thick layers of paint. He resorted to pastels in the years after World War II, when there was a shortage of oil paints. Later on, he returned to oils, layering them on the surface in thicker layers than ever; this presents quite a challenge when cleaning some of the paintings. The Byzantine phase of his last years is characterised by thinner layers of paint, with patches of unpainted surface.

== Personal ==
Milan Konjović was a second son of David Konjović, lawyer and royal public notary, and Vera (born Vukičević). The Konjović family came to Sombor from Patriarchate of Peć region at the time of the Great Serb Migration in the 1690s. Many members of the family were among cultural and intellectual elite of Sombor for centuries, including the prominent composer Petar Konjović. Milan Konjović's mother Vera was the daughter of the educator and writer Nikola Vukićević, the long-time director of the Serbian pedagogical school (Preparandija) in Sombor.

Milan Konjović was married to Ema Maštovska, whom he met in Prague. Their daughter Vera was born in Paris.

He is related to Brigitte Konjovic, Miss France 1978.

== See also ==
- List of painters from Serbia
- Serbian art
- Milan Kašanin
- Pavle Beljanski
