= Božidar Prokić =

Serbian historian (1859–1922)

Božidar Prokić (Zabojnica, near Kragujevac, 11 October 1859 – Belgrade, 6 May 1922) was a Serbian historian who was among the first Byzantinists. He was the principal founder of Byzantine Studies as an independent academic discipline at the University of Belgrade in 1906. His work is considered a significant contribution to the study and understanding of John Skylitzes and the history of the origin and development of the Bulgarian Empire under Samuel of Bulgaria.

He was also the director of the National Archives of Serbia during the Balkan Wars and World War I.

== Biography ==
After graduating from Belgrade's Velika škola, Prokić went to the University of Paris to further his studies. In 1892, he was invited to the Ludwig-Maximilians-Universität München where he collaborated in Byzantine Studies with Karl Krumbacher. At the time, Krumbacher was being appointed to the newly established chair in Byzantinistik at the university. Krumbacher and his associates began establishing Byzantine Studies as an independent academic discipline in modern universities.

Božidar Prokić was named professor of Medieval History at the Velika škola shortly after his arrival from Germany in 1892. Thirteen years later that institution of higher learning became the University of Belgrade in 1905.

His most important work is Die Zusätze in der Handschrift des Johannes Skylitzes, published in 1906. A second edition was published later. The value of the work was greatly enhanced by its bibliographies, and it remained a standard textbook for Byzantine studies for many years to come.

From 1892 until 1905, he taught at his alma mater until it became the University of Belgrade. Then he tried to convince the governors to establish a chair in Byzantinistik, like his colleague Krumbacher did in 1892 at the Ludwig-Maximilians-Universität München, but not fully satisfied with the university's transformation and the post he was offered, he resigned soon after. From 1911, he was the director of the National Archives of Serbia in Belgrade.

== Legacy ==
Some consider Božidar Prokić the father of southern Slavic Byzantology since he trained and inspired the first generation of Byzantists, including Dragutin Anastasijevic. The University of Belgrade also gave Byzantine Studies a Russian-born scholar -- George Ostrogorsky.

== See also ==
- Ljubomir Davidović
- Slobodan Jovanović
- Jovan Tomić
- Milan Grol
- Miloje Vasić
- Petar Pavlović
- Sima Trojanović
