= Gradimir Milovanović =

Serbian mathematician (born 1948)

Gradimir V. Milovanović
- Born: 2 January 1948 (age 78); Zorunovac, Serbia
- Education: University of Niš (B.Sc., M.Sc., D.Sc.)
- Known for: Gautschi–Milovanovic method
- Scientific career
- Fields: Mathematics
- Workplaces: University of Niš; Megatrend University; Mathematical Insfitute of SASA
- Doctoral advisor: Dragoslav Mitrinović

Gradimir V. Milovanović (born 2 January 1948) is a Serbian mathematician known for his contributions to approximation theory and numerical analysis. He has published over 450 papers and authored five monographs and more than twenty books in his area. He is a full member of the Serbian Academy of Sciences and Arts and of other Serbian and international scientific societies.

== Early life and education ==
Born in Zorunovac, in the Knjaževac municipality of mideastern Serbia, he studied at the University of Niš, obtaining a B.Sc. in electrical engineering and computer science (1971), an M.Sc. in mathematics (1974), and a D.Sc. (1976). His thesis was titled On Some Functional Inequalities advised by Dragoslav Mitrinović.

== Career ==
He served as a member of the faculty of electronic engineering and the department of mathematics at the University of Niš, and was promoted to professor in 1986 before serving as the acting Dean of the Faculty of Electronic Engineering from 2002 to 2004. He served as rector of the University of Niš from 2004 to 2006, as well as dean of the Faculty of Computer Sciences at the Megatrend University from 2008 to 2011, until he joined the Mathematical Institute of the Serbian Academy of Sciences and Arts in Belgrade (2011).

He has been a member of the board of the Mathematical Society of Serbia (2003 – 2006), president of the Scientific Council of the Mathematical Institute at Serbian Academy of Sciences and Arts in Belgrade (1997 – 2010), vice president of the Scientific Society of Serbia since 2002, president of the National Council for Scientific and Technological Development (2006 – 2010), and president of the Scientific Committee for Mathematics, Computer Sciences and Mechanics.
