= Radivoj Kašanin =

Serbian mathematician (1892–1989)

Radivoj Kašanin or Radivoje Kašanin (21 May 1892 – 30 October 1989) was a Serbian mathematician, university professor, and member of the Serbian Academy of Arts and Sciences.

Radivoje Kašanin was a scholar of natural sciences and participated in scientific culture. Due to his diversified knowledge in many areas of mathematics, mechanics, and astronomy he could be considered as Serbia's last encyclopedist. Radivoje Kašanin achieved success in many fields of his profession: theory of differential equations, the theory of complex functions, analysis, geometry, interpolation and approximation, mechanics, astronomy and geophysics and in each of mentioned fields of his work he published papers that were widely acknowledged.

== Biography ==
Radivoje Kašanin was born Beli Manastir, then part of the Habsburg monarchy, and attended the Serbian elementary school in his native town from 1892 to 1902. He completed the first three grades of the classical gymnasium in Osijek, and then he moved to Novi Sad, where he finished the fourth grade and passed the final examination. In 1910 he began his studies in mathematics and astronomy at the University of Vienna, then in 1911 at the University of Zagreb, where he stayed for two years before enrolling at the University of Budapest in 1913. The Great War cut short his studies in Budapest when he was mobilized by the Austro-Hungarian Army in 1914. He was immediately sent to the Russian front, where he survived the hostilities and by the end of the war, he went to Paris to pursue his higher studies at the Sorbonne in 1921. In 1924 he successfully defended his dissertation and received his Ph.D. in mathematics.

His mentor was the famed Balkan mathematician Mihailo Petrović Alas.

He moved back to Yugoslavia and was appointed assistant at the Technical Faculty of the University of Belgrade in 1922, an assistant professor in 1926, associate professor in 1930, and full professor in 1939. He was elected Rector of the Technical High School for two terms of office, 1950 and 1951.

Also, he was elected a corresponding member of the Serbian Academy of Sciences and Arts on 2 March 1946, and a full member on June 10, 1955. He served the post of director of the Institute of Mathematics from 1951 to 1958, was president of its Council from 1958 to 1961. In 1950 the Proceeding of the Institute of Mathematics was published and during the next ten years, Radivoje Kašanin was its editor-in-chief. From 1 October 1957 to 12 January 1959 Radivoje Kašanin served as deputy vice-president of the Serbian Academy of Sciences. He devoted his last years mathematically interpreting the cosmogonical theory of Pavle Savić.

Radivoje Kašanin died in Belgrade on October 30, 1989 where he was buried.

== See also ==
- Milan Kašanin, brother

== Bibliography ==
Only mathematical textbooks are included here, the rest can be found in a five page Bibliography in Serbian and English.

- "Viša matematika I", Grafički zavod "Slavija", sv. 1, Beograd, 1932, str. 80
- "Viša matematika I, sv. 1", Izdavačka knjižarnica Gece Kona, Beograd, 1933, str. 160
- "Viša matematika I", Beograd, 1934, str. 627
- "Viša matematika I", Centralno udruženje studenata tehnike, Beograd, 1946, str. 791 (2. prer. i dop. izdanje)
- "Viša matematika I", Beograd, 1949, str. 847 (3. izdanje)
- "Viša matematika II", knj. 1, Beograd, 1949, str. 624 * "Viša matematika II", knj. 2, Beograd, 1950, str. 679
- "Zbirka rešenih zadataka više matematike I, knj. 2", Geografski institut JNA, Beograd, 1952, str. 526
- "Zbirka rešenih zadataka više matematike I, knj. 1", Geografski institut JNA, Beograd, 1956, str. 588+(4)
- "Zbirka rešenih zadataka više matematike I, knj. 3", Geografski institut JNA, Beograd, 1959, str. 164+(4)
- "Viša matematika I", Sarajevo, 1969, str. 836 (4. izdanje)
