= Đurađ Bošković =

Serbian art historian (1904–1990)

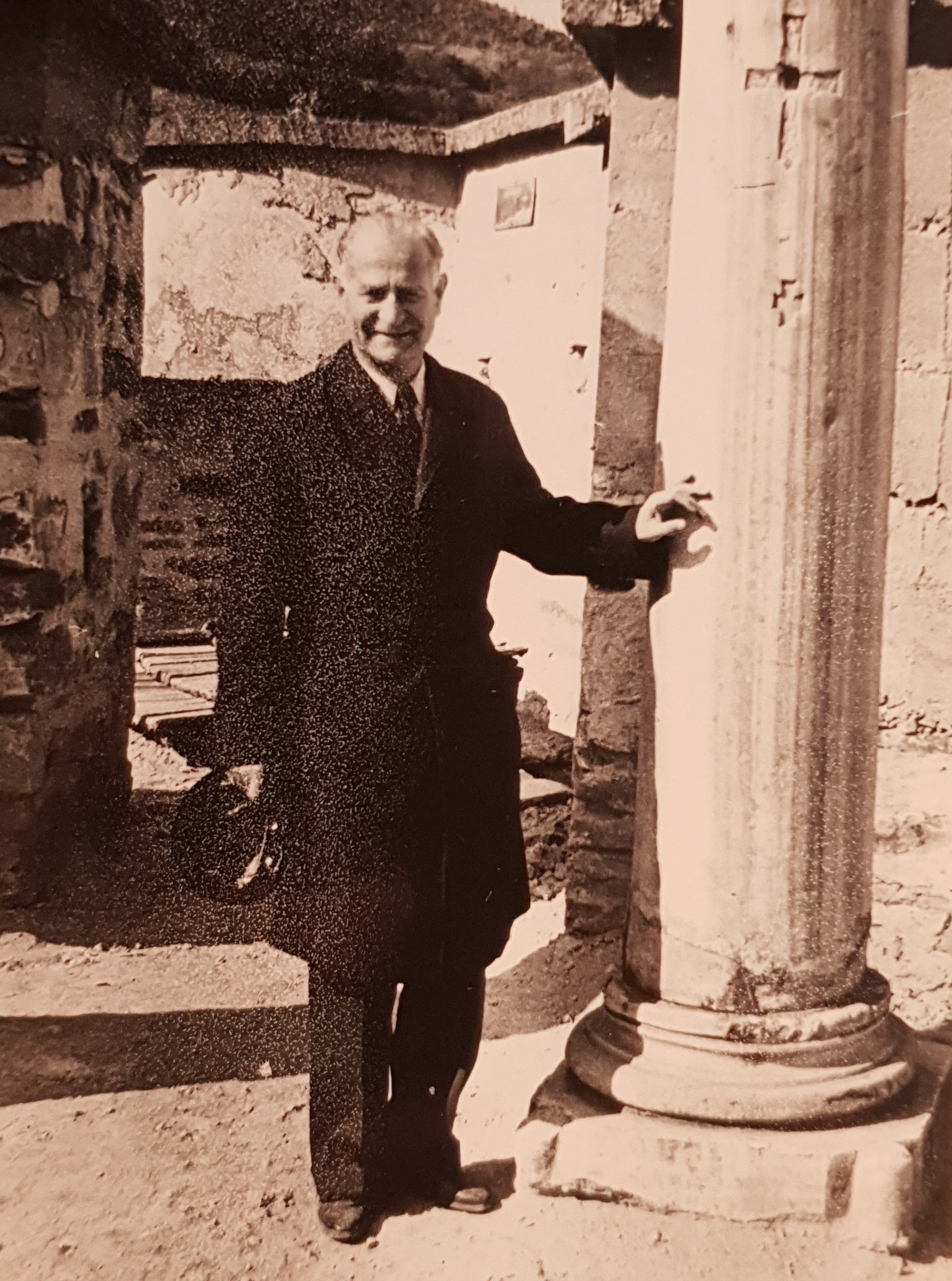
Bošković at Plaošnik site in Ohrid.

Đurađ Bošković (Serbian Cyrillic: Ђурaђ Бошковић; 11 April 1904 – 29 November 1990), also known as Đurđe Bošković (Serbian Cyrillic: Ђурђе Бошковић) was a Serbian art historian and researcher of Serbian medieval architecture.

== Biography ==
He was born and educated in Belgrade. He studied at the Technical Faculty of the University of Belgrade, where he graduated in 1928 from the Department of Architecture. He worked as the curator of the National Museum in Belgrade between 1930 and 1939. He became an assistant professor at the Technical Faculty in 1939, an associate professor in 1946 and a full professor in 1950. From 1954, he was the director of the Archaeological Institute of the Serbian Academy of Sciences and Arts. He was a prominent pedagogue in the fields of archeology and art history, and he gathered around him students interested in conservation and research work. He was the editor of the magazine Starinar, which affirmed itself as one of the most important Serbian magazines in the field of archeology and related fields. During his administration, the Archaeological Institute developed into a first-class scientific institution that cooperated with the world's most important archaeological centers.

== Scientific work ==
The main topic of Bošković's research interest was Serbian medieval architecture. He dedicated a large number of works to the study of unknown or little-known architectural monuments from medieval Serbia. He published the results of his scientific work mainly in the form of analytical studies in periodicals, then in the form of reports and travel notes. He was one of the authors of the monograph on the Manasija Monastery. In the monograph on Visoki Dečani, which was published in exceptional equipment just before the Second World War, he wrote an exhaustive part about the architecture and sculpture of this church monument. After the war, he worked on field research of architectural monuments of medieval Serbia. He published monographs on Gradac with Slobodan Nenadović, on Veluća, on the Benedictine monastery of Sv. Marija na Ratcu kod Bara (Св. Марије на Ратцу код Бара) with Vojislav Korać. Within the activities of the Archaeological Institute, he worked on the recording, studying and publishing the results of studies on cultural monuments on the territory of Serbia. After long and complex field research with a group of associates, he published a monograph on Stari Bar.

Although he directed most of his research efforts towards Serbian medieval architecture, Bošković also dealt with the architecture of other areas and epochs. In connection with the history of architecture on the territory of Serbia, he dealt with late antique and Byzantine architectural monuments, and he also dealt with the general medieval history of architecture. He published the most extensive works from medieval and Byzantine architecture in the multi-volume Russian General History of Architecture. Related to this research is his Medieval Architecture, which was used as a university textbook. Đurđe Bošković improved the history of architecture and the history of art through multifaceted research of architectural heritage. Dealing with architecture, he also delved into the field of medieval painting and old inscriptions. A special component of his work is his efforts to protect cultural property, where he worked directly as an advisor or as a member of expert groups and commissions. The bibliography of Bošković's works was published in the third edition of his Architecture of the Middle Ages from 1967 and in Starinar No. 20 for 1969. He collaborated with Gabriel Millet on special projects.

He died in Belgrade on 29 November 1990.

== Works ==
- Monastery Manasija with Stanoje Stanojević and Lazar Mirković (1928)
- Medieval Art in Serbia and Macedonia (1952)
- Ko Je bio Jovan, sevast Prosenika? (1954)
- Nekoliko natpisa sa zidova srpskih sredovekovnih crkva (1938)
- Gradac (1951)

== Literature ==
- Bošković, Djurdje (M. Suput, pp. 293–294), Encyclopedia of Serbian Historiography, Belgrade 1997.
