= Gradislav =

Slavic masculine given name

- Gender: masculine

Origin
- Language: Slavic

Other names
- Related names: Gradimir

Gradislav (Cyrillic: Градислав) is an old Serbian masculine given name of Slavic origin.

Notable people with the name:

- Gradislav Borilović (fl. 1325–1352), Serbian magnate
- Gradislav Vojšić (fl. 1284–1327), Serbian nobleman
