= Vladimir Petković (art historian) =

Serbian art historian (1874–1956)

Vladimir R. Petković (Donja Livadica, Serbia, 30 September 1874 – Belgrade, Yugoslavia, 13 November 1956) was a Serbian art historian who initiated this scientific discipline in the Serbian cultural milieu. He was also a professor at the University of Belgrade.

== Biography ==
He received his elementary education in his hometown, Oreovica, Kuseljevo, Svilajnac and in Kragujevac he attended high school. He studied the Department of Philology and History at the Velika škola in Belgrade between 1893 and 1897. He attended doctoral studies at the Ludwig-Maximilians-Universität München and the University of Halle. Between 1900 and 1905, he served as assistant custodian of the warden of the National Museum in Belgrade, and between 1905 and 1909, he taught as a part-time professor at the Faculty of Engineering, University of Belgrade. He became a full professor at the Faculty of Philosophy of the University of Belgrade in 1911. He was the founder of the Seminar for the History of Art in 1919 where he was appointed associate professor in 1919 and full professor in 1922. In the 1920s, he led the National Museum of Serbia's field project at Stobi.

== Scientific work ==
Petković was involved in scientific and pedagogical work, but his organizational work was also important. Between 1921 and 1935, he was the director of the National Museum in Belgrade, then between 1947 and 1956 the director of the Serbian Academy of Sciences and Arts's Archeological Institute and also held the duties of some scientific and professional publications, including the Starinar magazine (1931–1956). He was a regular member of the Serbian Academy of Sciences and Arts and a member of several European learned societies.

The main area of scientific research of Vladimir Petkovic was Serbian medieval art, especially fresco painting. In Serbian historiography, he laid the foundations for the scientific study of monumental heritage. He gained his knowledge during his extensive fieldwork, after which he published numerous articles and monographic studies on Serbian medieval monasteries, churches, and paintings. He published well-known collections of material on medieval frescoes in Serbia and Macedonia, and his review of church monuments is particularly significant.

He wrote about the stylistic characteristics of painting, especially iconography when he noticed the existence of special schools in Serbian medieval painting. He was also the first to pay attention to the importance of late medieval monuments - the sixteenth and seventeenth centuries, part of which he published. He worked as an archeologist in Stobi and Justiniana Prima.

== See also ==
- Milan Kašanin
- Svetozar Radojčić

== Bibliography ==
- 1906 Žiča, Architecture and Painting", Starinar, Belgrade
- 1908 "Frescoes from the Inner Narthex of the church in Kalenić", Starinar, Belgrade
- 1911 "Serbian Monuments of the 7th-8th Centuries", Starinar, Belgrade
- 1922 Ravanica Monastery, Belgrade
- 1924 Studenica Monastery, Belgrade
- 1926 Kalenić Monastery, Vršac
- 1933 Staro Nagoričane - Psača - Kalenić (iconography and painting), Belgrade
- 1937 Antique sculptures in Stobi, Starinar, Belgrade
- 1939 "Excavation of the Emperor's City near Lebanon in 1938", Starinar, Belgrade
- 1941 Dečani Monastery, Belgrade
- 1950 A review of church monuments through the Serbian People's Narrative, Belgrade

Cultural offices
| Preceded by Miloje Vasić | Director of National Museum of Serbia; 1919–1935 | Succeeded by Milan Kašanin |
