= Nikodim Kondakov =

Russian art historian (1844–1925)

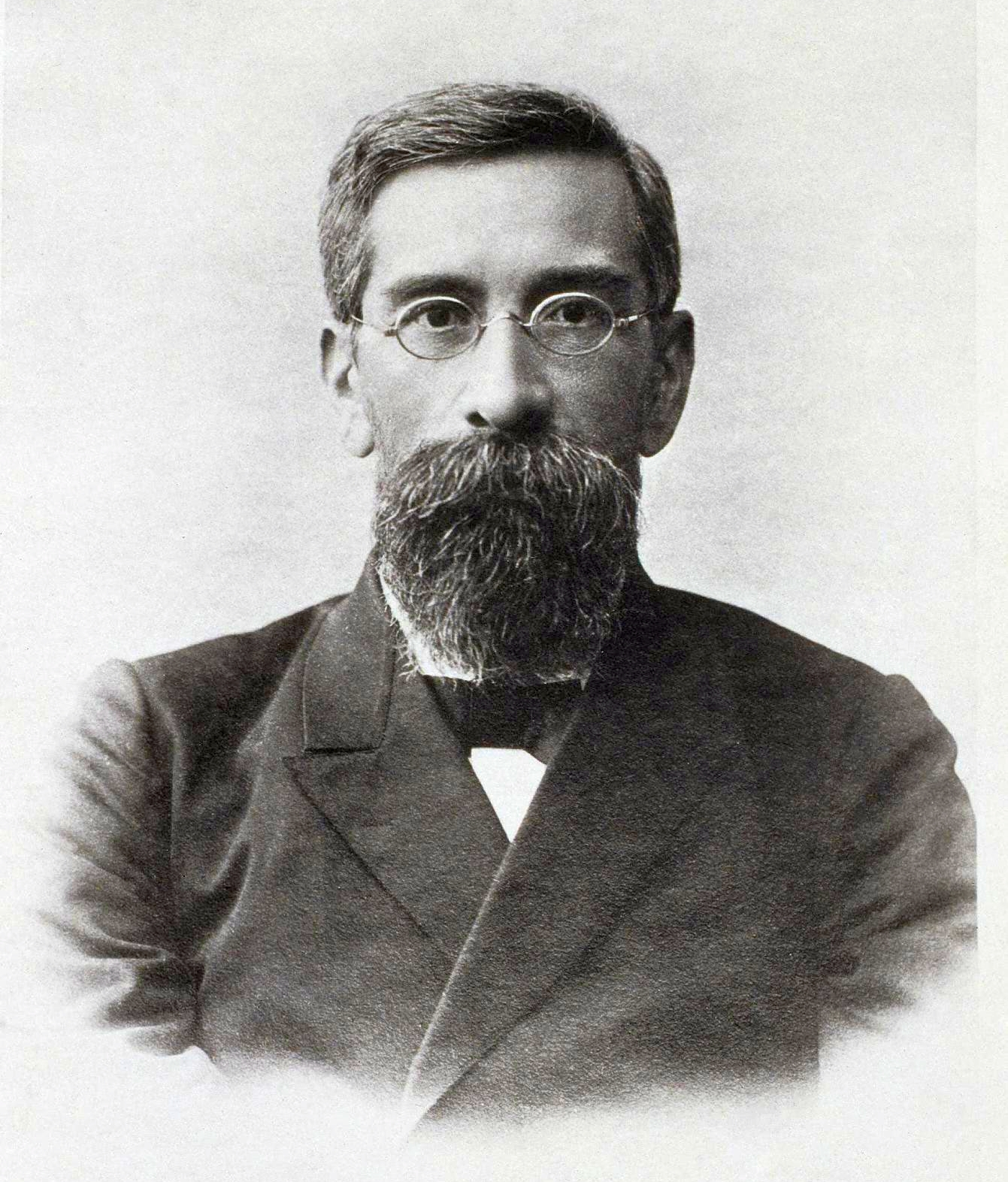
Nikodim Kondakov (1890s)

Nikodim (or Nikodeme) Pavlovich Kondakov (Russian: Никоди́м Па́влович Кондако́в; 1 (13) November 1844 – 17 February 1925) was an art historian with special expertise in the history of Russian and Serbian Christian icons. He is remembered as a pioneer among art historians who studied the treasures of Mount Athos like Frenchman Gabriel Millet.

== Biography ==
Nicodem Pavlovitch Kondakov was born in the Russian Empire in 1844, in the village of Khalan in Kursk Governorate. He attended Moscow University under Fedor Buslaev from 1861 to 1865.

After graduation he taught in the Moscow Art School.

In 1870 he became a lecturer in the University of Novorossia, Odessa (now Odessa National University, Ukraine), and in 1877 a professor there.

From 1888 he taught in St. Petersburg University. From 1893 he was a member of the Russian Academy of Fine Arts, and from 1898 a member of the Russian Academy of Sciences. In 1895 with Fyodor Uspensky he founded the Russian Archaeological Institute of Constantinople.

During the Revolution of 1917 and the Civil War in Russia Kondakov lived in Odessa and Yalta (see: South Russia (1919–1920)).

In 1920 he emigrated to Bulgaria, and then to Czechoslovakia, where he taught in Prague University until his death in 1925.

In his first book, on Greek manuscript illumination, published in 1877, Kondakov approached the stylistic evolution of eastern Romanesque art through the use of artistic ideal. He collaborated with Salomon Reinach in Antiquités de la Russie Méridionale (1891). His lectures influenced future historians, among others, Michael Rostovtzeff. Kondakov wrote numerous works on the history of Ancient Greek, Russian, Georgian and Eastern Roman art. He founded the modern method in the history of the art of the Eastern Roman Empire.

== See also ==
- Stevan Dimitrijević
- Gabriel Millet
- Ljuba Kovačević
- Ljubomir Stojanović
- Vladimir Ćorović
- Alexander Solovyev
