= Stevan Dimitrijević =

Serbian theologian, historian, and Chetnik

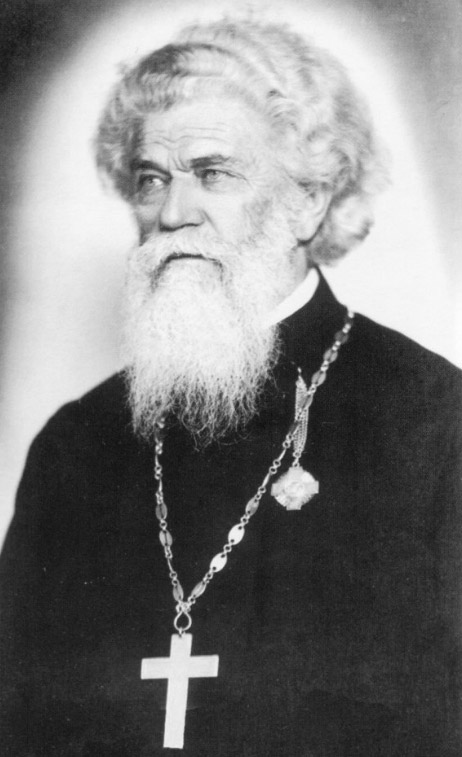
Stevan Dimitrijević.

Stevan Dimitrijević (10 January 1866 in Aleksinac – 24 November 1953 in Belgrade) was a Serbian theologian, historian and pastor to Chetnik freedom-fighter in Ottoman-occupied Old Serbia and Macedonia during the beginning of the 20th century.

== Biography ==
He graduated from the theology department of the University of Belgrade and the Kiev Theological Academy. Upon his return in 1894 he was a professor in Skopje and Salonica, the rector of the Theology school in Prizren, a full-time professor of the University of Belgrade from 1920 to 1936 and the founder and first dean of the Theological Faculty in Belgrade. His students include bishop Nikolaj Velimirović, Varnava, Serbian Patriarch, Gavrilo V, Serbian Patriarch, German, Serbian Patriarch, Pavle, Serbian Patriarch and John of Shanghai and San Francisco.

In 1937 he was awarded an honorary doctorate of the University of Athens. In Belgrade, in 1936, at Kolarac he was conferred an honorary doctorate in theology and became a member of the History institute of Serbian Academy of Sciences and Arts. During his service in Skopje, Salonica and Prizren he collected over 600 manuscripts and printed books, and gave them to the National Library in Belgrade. His major works were on Serbian church historiography. Dimitrijević is a recipient of numerous tributes and decorations-the fourth level Karađorđe's star, the third level White Eagle, the second level St. Sava for his work in the field of science and patriotism.

== See also ==
- Gabriel Millet
- Nikodim Kondakov
- Ljuba Kovačević
- Ljubomir Stojanović
- Vladimir Ćorović
- Alexander Solovyev
