= Mihailo Petrović Alas =

Serbian mathematician and philosopher (1868–1943)

Mihailo Petrović
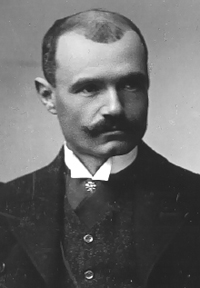
- Petrović in 1905
- Born: Mihailo Petrović; 6 May 1868; Belgrade, Principality of Serbia
- Died: 8 June 1943 (aged 75); Belgrade, German-occupied Serbia
- Education: Belgrade University; École Normale Supérieure
- Known for: Differential equations Phenomenology
- Scientific career
- Fields: Mathematician
- Workplaces: Belgrade University; Serbian Royal Academy
- Thesis: Sur les zéros et les infinis des intégrales des équations différentielles algébriques (1894)
- Doctoral advisor: Charles Hermite; Charles Émile Picard
- Doctoral students: Jovan Karamata; Dragoslav Mitrinović; Radivoj Kašanin

Signature
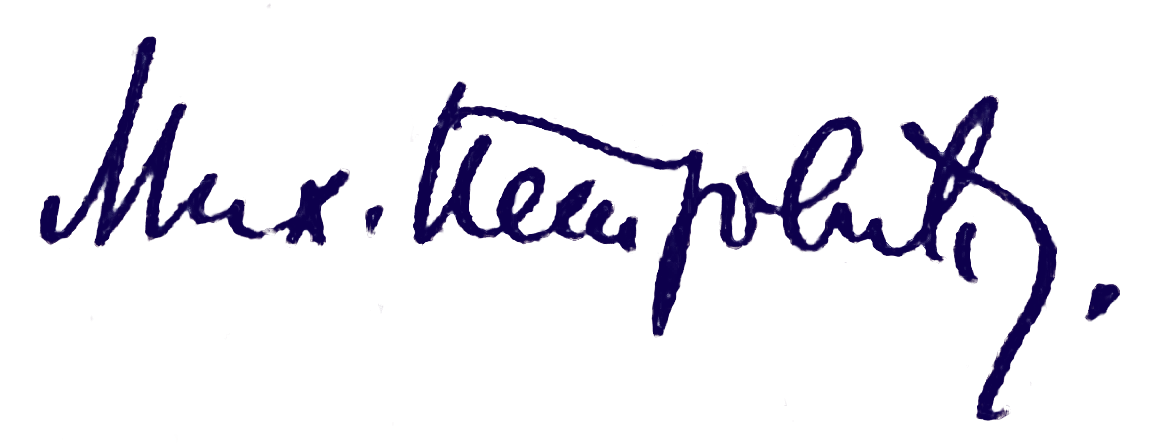

Mihailo Petrović Alas (Serbian Cyrillic: Михаило Петровић Алас; also Michel Pétrovitch; 6 May 1868 – 8 June 1943) was a Serbian mathematician, inventor, university professor and academic. He was a distinguished professor at Belgrade University, an academic, philosopher, writer, publicist, musician, businessman, traveler and volunteer in the Balkan Wars, the First and Second World Wars and licensed fisherman by trade – hence his nickname "Alas" ("fisherman on the rivers").

He was a student of Henri Poincaré, Paul Painlevé, Charles Hermite and Émile Picard. Petrović contributed significantly to the study of differential equations and phenomenology, founded engineering mathematics in Serbia, and invented one of the first prototypes of a hydraulic analog computer.

== Biography ==
Petrović was born on 6 May 1868, in Belgrade, as the first child of Nikodim, a professor of theology, and Milica (née Lazarević). Petrović' father died when he was young, and his grandfather helped raise him.

He finished the First Belgrade Gymnasium in 1885, and afterwards enrolled at the natural science-mathematical section of the Faculty of Philosophy in Belgrade. At the time when he finished his studies in Serbia in 1889, several Serbian mathematicians who had acquired their doctorate degrees abroad, like Dr. Dimitrije Nešić (at Vienna and Karlsruhe Institute of Technology), Dr. Dimitrije Danić (at Jena, 1885) and Bogdan Gavrilović (at Budapest, 1887) were beginning to make a name for themselves. Subsequently, in September 1889, he too went abroad, to Paris to receive further education, and to prepare for the entrance exam to the École Normale Supérieure. He got a degree in mathematical sciences from Sorbonne University in 1891. He worked on preparing his doctoral dissertation, and on 21 June 1894 he defended his PhD degree at the Sorbonne, and received a title Docteur des sciences mathematiques (doctor of mathematical sciences). His doctorate was in the field of differential equations.

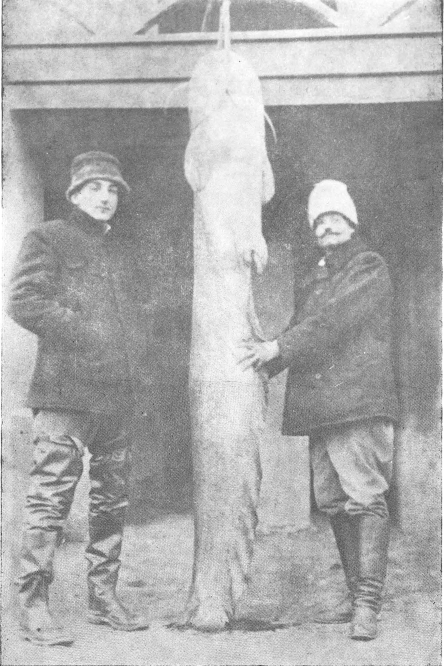
George, Crown Prince of Serbia and Alas posing beside a big catch

In 1894, Petrović became a professor of mathematics at the Belgrade's Velika škola (which later became the University of Belgrade). In those days, he was one of the greatest experts for differential equations. He held lectures until his retirement in 1938.

In 1897, he became an associate member of the Serbian Royal Academy and associate member of the Yugoslav Academy of Sciences and Arts in Zagreb. He became a full member of the Serbian Royal Academy in 1899, when he was only 31.

In 1882, he became a fisherman apprentice, and in 1895 he took an exam to become a master fisherman. Mihailo Petrović got the nickname "Alas" (river fisher) because of his passion for fishery. He was not only an aficionado, but expert as well. He participated in legislative talks regarding the fishery convention with Romania, and in talks with Austria-Hungary about the protection of the fishery on Sava, Drina and Danube rivers. Alas published expert papers and reports on the fish-fauna found in the Macedonian lakes, such as Skadar Lake and Ohrid Lake.

Mihailo Petrović Alas also constructed a hydrointegrator, and won the gold medal at the World Exposition in Paris 1900. When in 1905 the Velika škola was transformed into the University of Belgrade Petrović was among first eight regular professors, who elected other professors. He patented a total of 10 inventions, published 300 scientific works and a number of books and journals from his sea expeditions. These expeditions included trips to Azores, Newfoundland and Labrador, Suez Canal, Madagascar, Cape Verde, Canary Islands, Greenland, Iceland, Bermuda Triangle, Caribbean and others. Petrovć also visited both the North and South poles, researched the culture of Eskimos and took part in whale hunting expeditions.

He received numerous awards and acknowledgments and was a member of several foreign science academies (Prague, Bucharest, Warsaw, Kraków) and scientific societies. In 1927, when Jovan Cvijić died, members of the Serbian academy proposed Mihailo Petrović as the new president of academy, but the authorities did not accept this proposal. Probable reason for this was that Mihailo Petrović Alas was first a private tutor and mentor and later a close friend of the prince Đorđe P. Karađorđević, the king's brother, who was arrested in 1925, and held in house arrest.

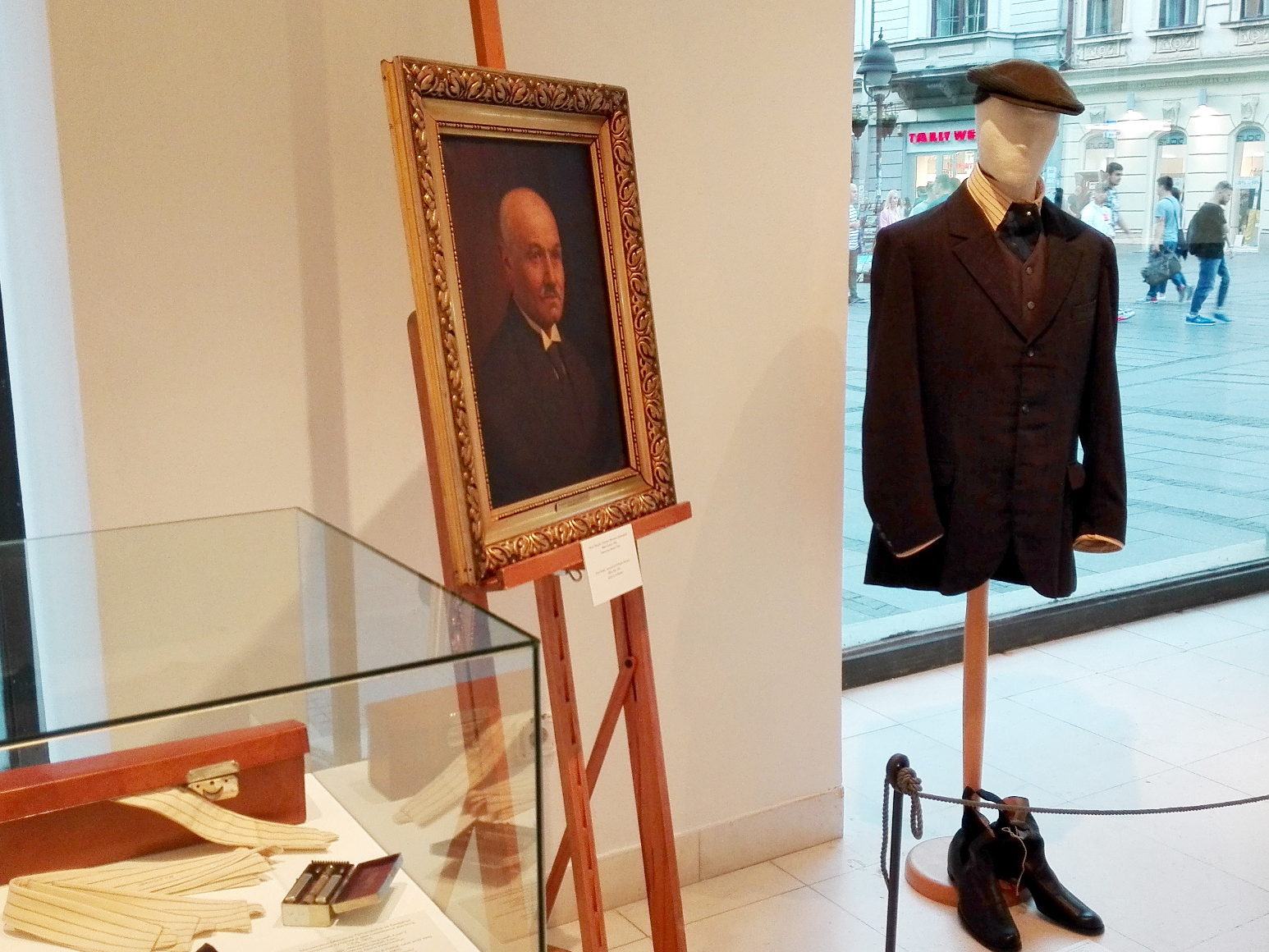
Personal items of Mihailo Petrović

In 1931, members of the academy unanimously proposed Alas for the president of the academy, but authorities again dismissed this proposal. Mathematician and physicist Bogdan Gavrilović, a fellow professor, was nominated instead. In 1939, he became an honorary doctor at the University of Belgrade. In the same year, he received the order of Saint Sava, first class.

He also founded the Belgrade School of Mathematics, which produced a number of mathematicians who continued Alas's work.

Science at the University of Belgrade had advanced andt the first doctorate in mathematical sciences was defended under the supervision of professor Petrović. In 1912, this doctorate in the field of differential equations was defended by Mladen Berić, a teacher at the First Belgrade Gymnasium and his assistant. All doctoral dissertations defended on the Belgrade University since 1912 until the Second World War were under his mentorship.

Alas participated in the Balkan Wars and in the First World War as an officer, and after the war he served as a reserve officer. He practised cryptography, and his cipher systems were used by the Yugoslav army even for some time after World War II. When the Second World War broke out in Yugoslavia, he was again called into the army and the Germans captured him. After a while, he was released because of illness. On 8 June 1943, professor Petrović died in his home in Kosančićev Venac Street in Belgrade.

== Private life ==
He played violin, and in 1896, founded a musical society named Suz.

Alas and fellow scientist Milutin Milanković were close friends for several decades.

== Legacy ==
Ninth Belgrade Gymnasium "Mihailo Petrović Alas" and Primary School in John's Street is a high school in Belgrade, Serbia named after him. Alas and fellow scientist Milutin Milanković were close friends for several decades.

Due to his scientific work and results, Mihailo Petrović Alas is among the greatest Serbian mathematicians as well as one of the 100 most prominent Serbs.

In the Association for Culture, Art and International Cooperation "Adligat" in Belgrade there is an extensive fund of documents from the legacy of Mihailo Petrović Alas, including his childhood photos, letters from his grandfather who educated him, diplomas, notes, a whole bundle of published and unpublished manuscripts, as well as numerous exam reports signed by him, among which is the report on the defense of the graduation exam jointly signed by Mihailo Petrović and Milutin Milanković.

== Awards and memberships ==
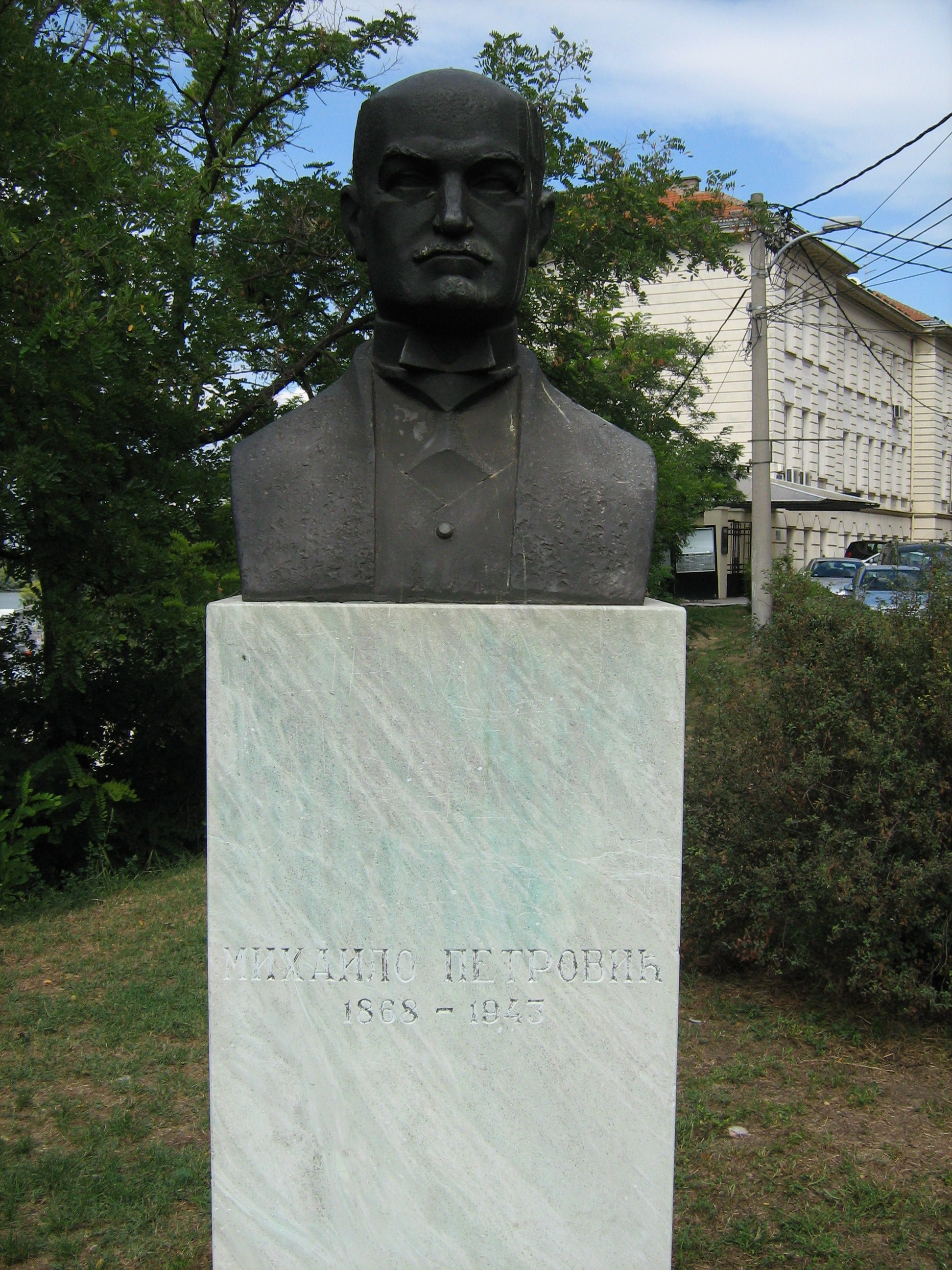
Bust of Mika Alas

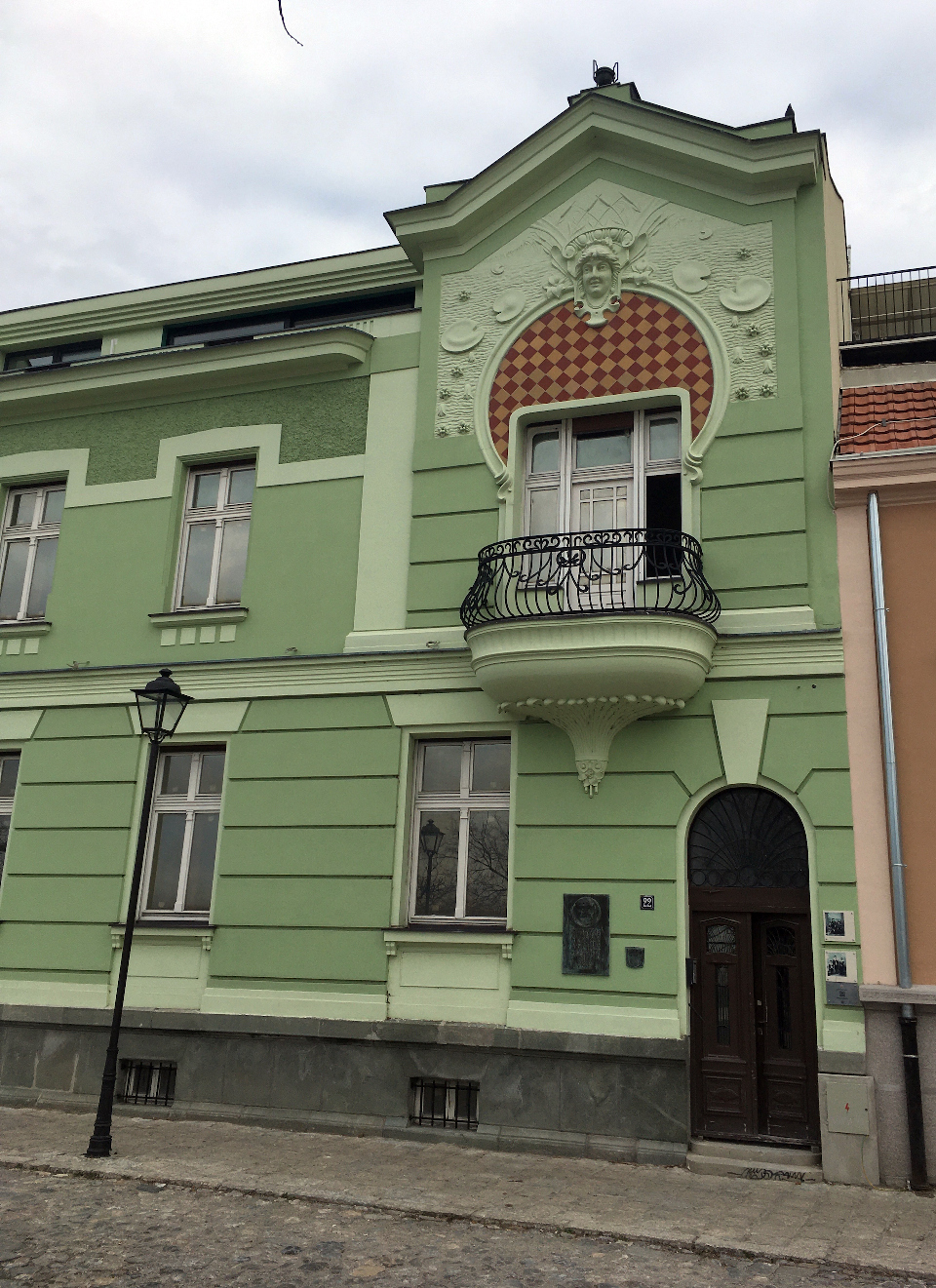
Mika Alas's House on Kosančićev Venac

- Member of Serbian academy of sciences and arts
- Member of Yugoslav academy
- Member of Academy of Sciences of the Czech Republic
- Member of academy, Bucharest
- Member of academy, Warsaw
- Member of academy, Kraków
- Member of various societies, Prague
- Member of various societies in Paris
- Member of various societies in Berlin
- Member of various societies in France
- Member of society of Italian mathematicians, Palermo
- Member of society of German mathematicians, Leipzig
- Member of Shevchenko Scientific Society, Lviv
- Member of scientific expedition for explorationof the South Pole
- Member of Rotary Club, Belgrade
- Order of Miloš the Great
- Order of St. Sava, 1st degree
- Order of St. Sava, 2nd degree
- Order of St. Sava, 3rd degree
- Order of the Romanian crown, 3rd degree
- Honorary brevet from London's society of mathematicians
- Honorary president of Yugoslav Alliance of students of mathematics
- Honorary doctor of science, University of Belgrade

== Selected works ==
- O asimptonim vrednostima integrala i deferencijalnih jednačina, Beograd, 1895.
- Elementi matematicke fenomenologije, Beograd 1911.
- Les spectres numeriques, Paris 1919.
- Mecanismes communs aux phenomenes disparates, Paris 1921,
- Notice sur les travaux scientifiques de M. Michel Petrovich, Paris, 1922
- Durees physiques independantes des dimensions spatiales, Zurich-Paris, 1924.
- Lecons sur les spectres mathematiques, Paris, 1928.
- Integrales premieres a restrictions, Paris, 1929.
- Integrales qualitative des equations differentielles, Paris, 1931.
- Fenomenološko preslikavanje, Beograd, 1933.
- Jedan diferencijalni algoritam i njegove primene, Beograd, 1936.
- Članci, Beograd, 1949.
- Metafore i alegorije, Beograd 1967.
- Računanje sa brojnim razmacima, Beograd, 1932.
- Eliptičke funkcije, Beograd, 1937.
- Integracije diferencijalnih jednačina pomoću redova, Beograd 1938.
- Kroz polarnu oblast, Beograd 1932.
- U carstvu gusara, Beograd, 1933.
- Sa okeanskim ribarima, Beograd, 1935.
- Po zabačenim ostrvima, Beograd, 1936.
- Roman jegulje, Beograd, 1940.
- Đerdapski ribolov u prošlosti i sadašnjosti, Beograd, 1941.
- Daleka kopna i mora, Beograd, 1948.
- Po gusarima i drugim ostrvima, Beograd 1952.
- S okenaskim ribarima, Subotica, 1953.
- Po gusarskim ostrvima, Beograd, 1960.
- Sa Arktika do Antarktika, Beograd, 1960.

Edition of the complete works:

- Book 1: Diferencijalne jednacine I
- Book 2: Diferencijalne jednacine II
- Book 3: Matematička analiza
- Book 4: Algebra
- Book 5: Matematički spektri
- Book 6: Matematička fenomenologija
- Book 7: Elementi matematičke fenomenologije
- Book 8: Intervalna matematika – diferencijalni algoritam
- Book 9: Eliptičke funkcije – integracija pomoću redova
- Book 10: Članci – studije
- Book 11: Putopisi I
- Book 12: Putopisi II
- Book 13: Metafore i alegorije – članci
- Book 14: Ribarstvo
- Book 15: Mihailo Petrović (pisma, bibliografija i letopis)

== See also ==
- Mika Alas's House, where he lived, worked, and died, is a designated historic site.
- Bogdan Gavrilović
- Jovan Karamata

== Literature ==
- Trifunović, Dragan (1991). Bard srpske matematike Mihailo Petrović Alas, Prilog intelektualnoj biografiji. Belgrade: Zavod za udžbenike i nastavna sredstva.

Academic offices
Preceded by Svetolik Radovanović	Dean of the Faculty of Philosophy; 1908–1909	Succeeded by Đorđe Stanojević
