= Dragoslav Mitrinović =

Serbian mathematician

- Born: 23 June 1908; Smederevo
- Died: 2 April 1995 (aged 86); Belgrade
- Education: University of Belgrade
- Scientific career
- Fields: Mathematics
- Workplaces: University of Niš; University of Belgrade
- Doctoral advisor: Mihailo Petrović
- Doctoral students: Gradimir Milovanovic

Dragoslav S. Mitrinović (Serbian Cyrillic: Драгослав Митриновић; 23 June 1908 – 2 April 1995) was a Serbian mathematician known for his work in differential equations, functional equations, complex analysis. He authored near 300 scientific journal papers and more than twelve books in his area.

== Biography ==
Born in Smederevo, he studied in Pristina and Vranje, graduating in mathematics at the University of Belgrade Faculty of Philosophy (1932). He earned a Ph.D. (1933) on a study of differential equations entitled Istraživanja o jednoj važnoj diferencijalnoj jednačini prvog reda (that is, Investigations of an important differential equation of the first order), advised by Mihailo Petrović.

He then worked as a secondary school teacher until 1946, when he visited University of Paris (1946) before joining the faculty at Skopje University in Macedonia where he founded the school of mathematics and two journals, eventually being elected to the Macedonian Academy of Sciences and Arts. He then worked for the University of Belgrade Faculty of Electrical Engineering (1951–78), where he also became head of the math department (1953) and the founder of the Belgrade School of Functional Equations, Differential Equations and Inequalities, as well the School of Mathematics (1960). He also headed the math department at University of Niš (1965–75).

He was also affiliated with American Mathematical Society and Société Mathématique de France. He was among the founders of the Serbian Scientific Society, the Mathematical documentation center of the Society of Mathematicians and Physicists of Serbia, the president of the Society of Mathematicians and Physicists of Macedonia, the president of the Commission for Mathematics of the Federal Council for the Coordination of Scientific Research.

Mitrinović was author or co-author of several well regarded monographs on analytic and geometric inequalities.
