= Mika Alas House =

Historic house in Belgrade, Serbia

Coordinates: 44.8172°N 20.4512°E

- Кућа Мике Аласа
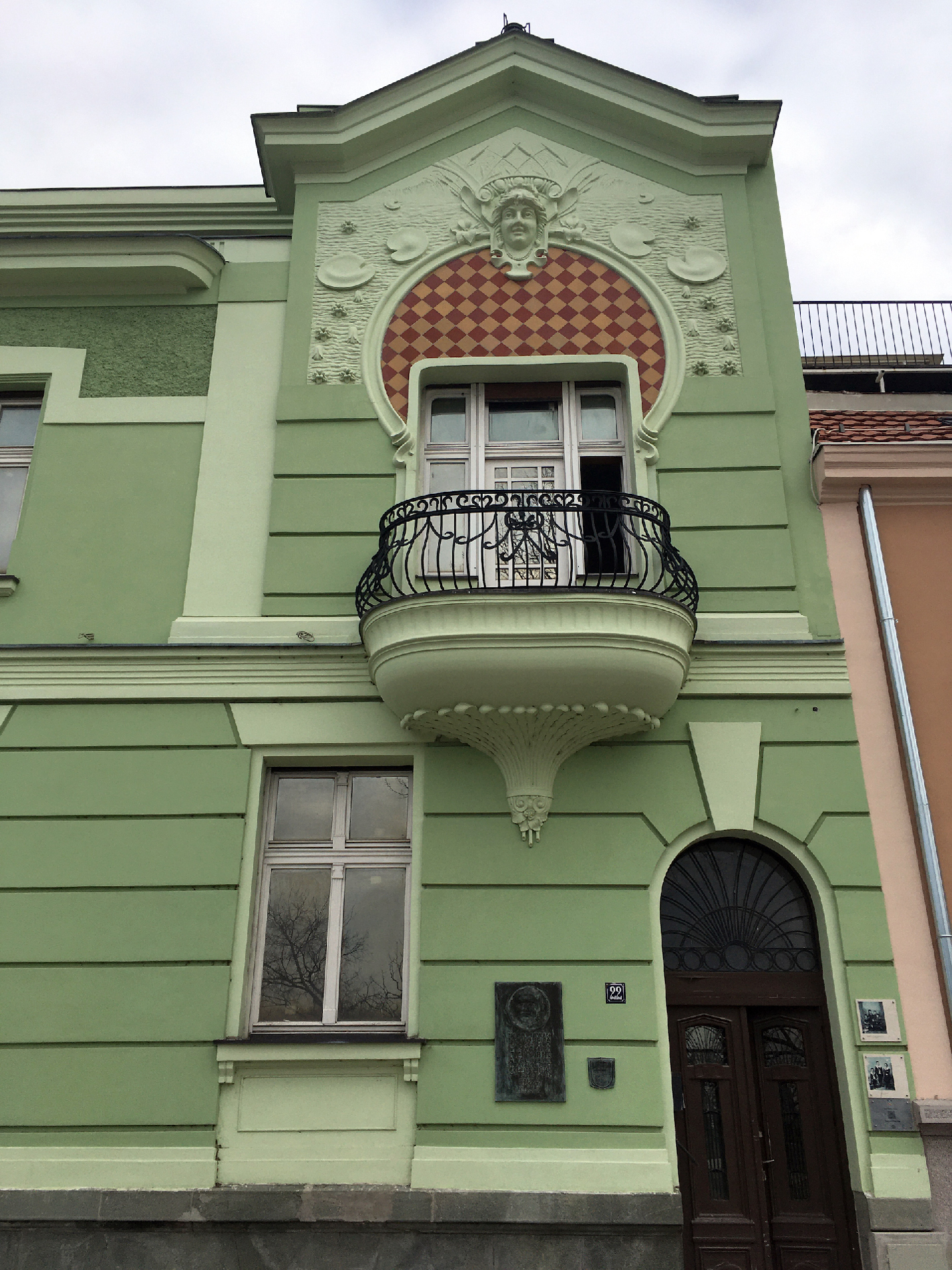
- Mika Alas` house, in 2020

- Location within Belgrade

General information
- Location: 22 Kosančićev Venac Street, Belgrade, Serbia
- Construction started: 1910; 116 years ago

Design and construction
- Architect: Petar Bajalović

The House of Mihailo Petrović, also known as Mika Alas House (Serbian: Кућа Мике Аласа, romanized: Kuća Mike Alasa) is a house and a designated historic site in Belgrade, the capital of Serbia. Built in 1910, it is located at 22 Kosančićev Venac Street. Mathematician and scientist Mihailo Petrović (1868–1943) lived, worked and died there. In the early 1900s there was an expression that "half of the Serbian science lives at 22 Kosančićev Venac."

== Architecture ==
It was designed by architect Petar Bajalović, then an assistant professor at the Belgrade University. The confluence of the Sava and Danube rivers can be seen from its balcony.

Petrović, who was a passionate fisherman which earned him a nickname (alas, river fisherman), was personally involved in the decoration of the façade which was mostly influenced by the water world – water lilies, fishes, reeds. Wooden double-leaf doors have carvings of the common carps. Though the house was declared a cultural monument mainly because of its historical significance, it is a city's rarity in the style of the Vienna Secession and has exquisite style value.

== Reconstructions ==
The façade was reconstructed in 1968, marking 100th anniversary of Petrović's birth. It was done by the project of architect Branka Bremec. She used the archived drawing of Bajalović, who originally projected the house, and the only two existing photographs of the house, both from 1921. In the 1970s, three previously unknown photographs of the house from the 1930s were published as part of the Memorial Fund of the Colonel Jeremija Stanojević. They were only discovered in 2017, by the conservator-restorer Rade Mrlješ from the Belgrade's Institute for the protection of the cultural monuments. New photos showed that the 1921 photographs were taken with the Sun in its zenith, which shadowed the façade obscuring numerous ornaments which were visible on the latter photographs.

There were ornaments in the shape of reeds, water grass and bamboo above the female head and the circular red-white checkered field. The soffit below the terrace, thought to be convex was actually concave, while there was a brushy treatment of the area above the two windows on the floor. Not being visible on the 1921 photographs, Bremac didn't include any of them in her project so they were missing from the façade. In the spring of 2017, the new reconstruction began, due to finish in late December 2017, marking 150 years since Petrović's birth in 2018. The interior will not be repaired as it already significantly changed from the original 1910 look while its planned massive refurbishment from 1968 was never finished. Mrlješ organized sculptors to recreate the ornaments missing from the 1968 reconstruction, so the façade will be restored to its original decorative look.

A bust of Mika Alas was erected across the street, facing the house. Placed in 1969, it is work of Aleksandar Zarin.

== Gallery ==
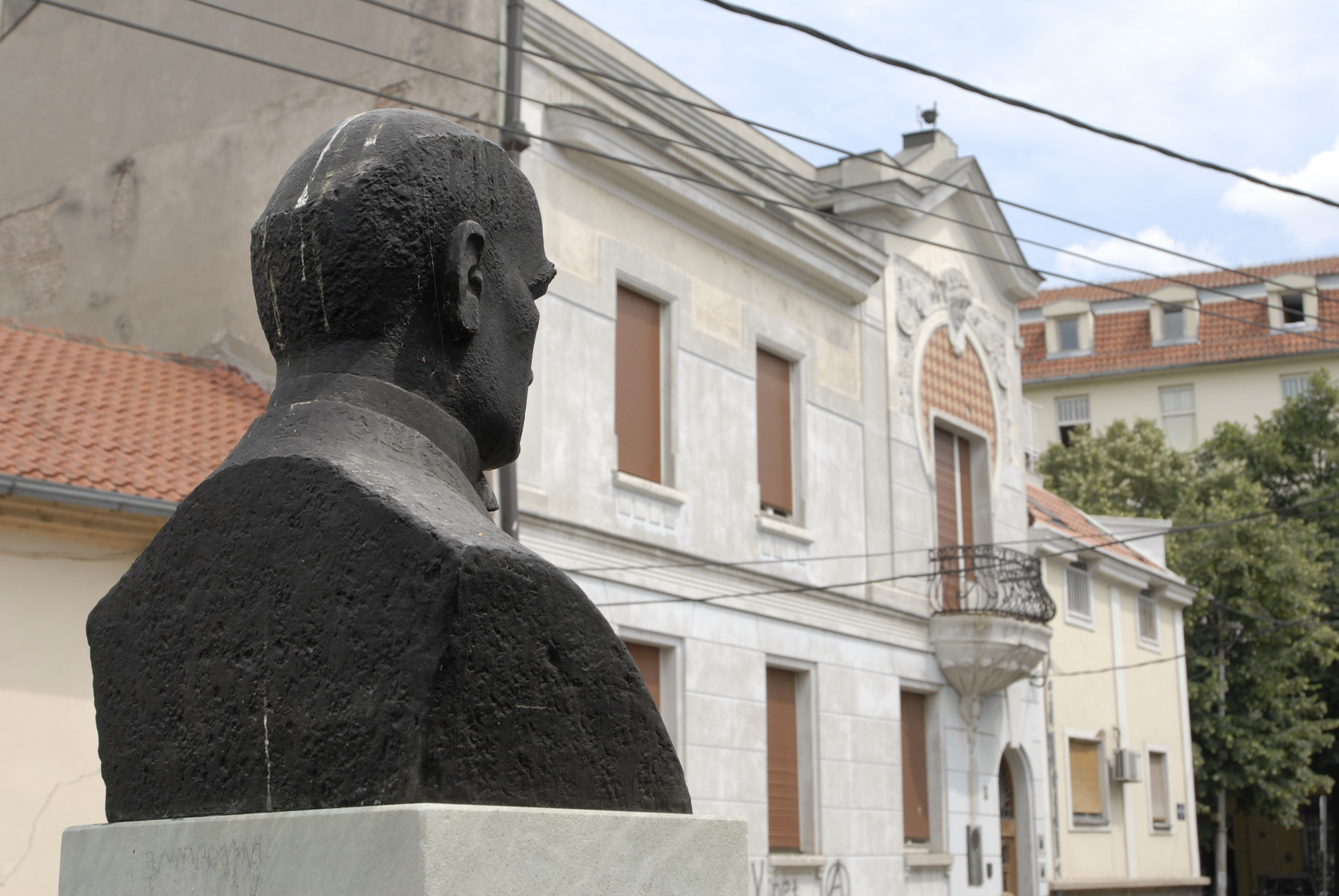
Mika Alas`s House

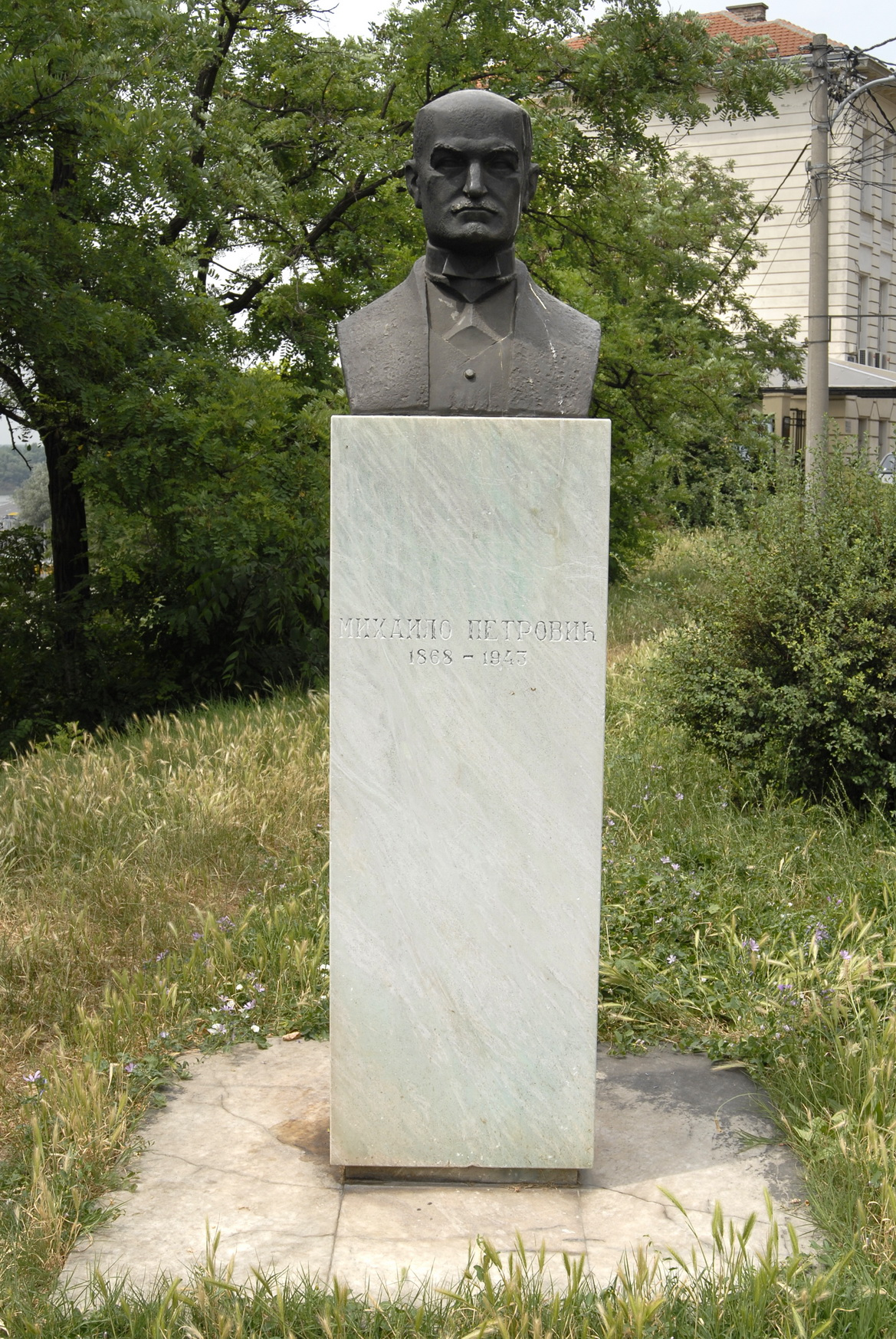
Bust of Mika Alas, across the street, by Aleksandar Zarin (1969)

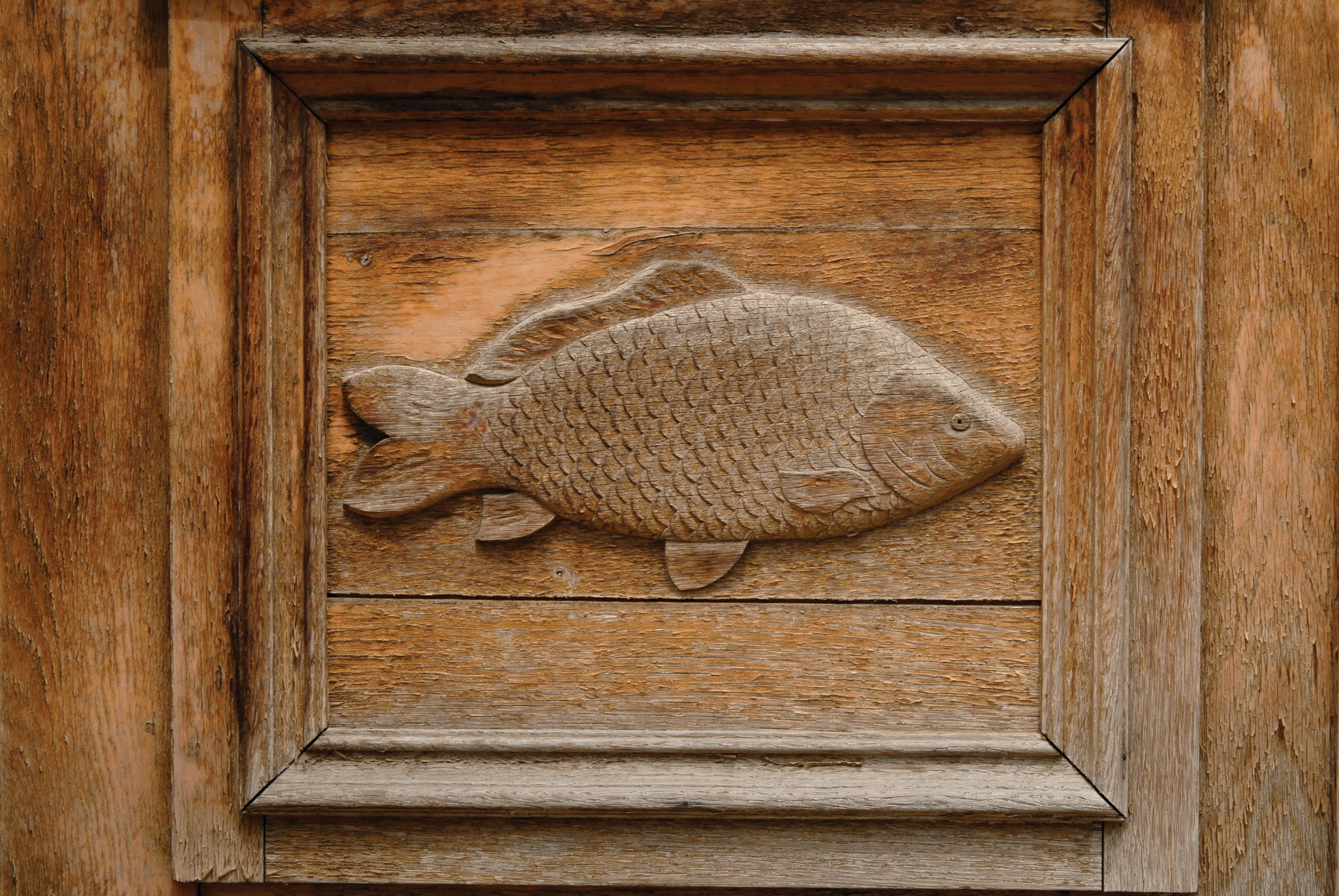
Detail from the entrance door:
carved common carp

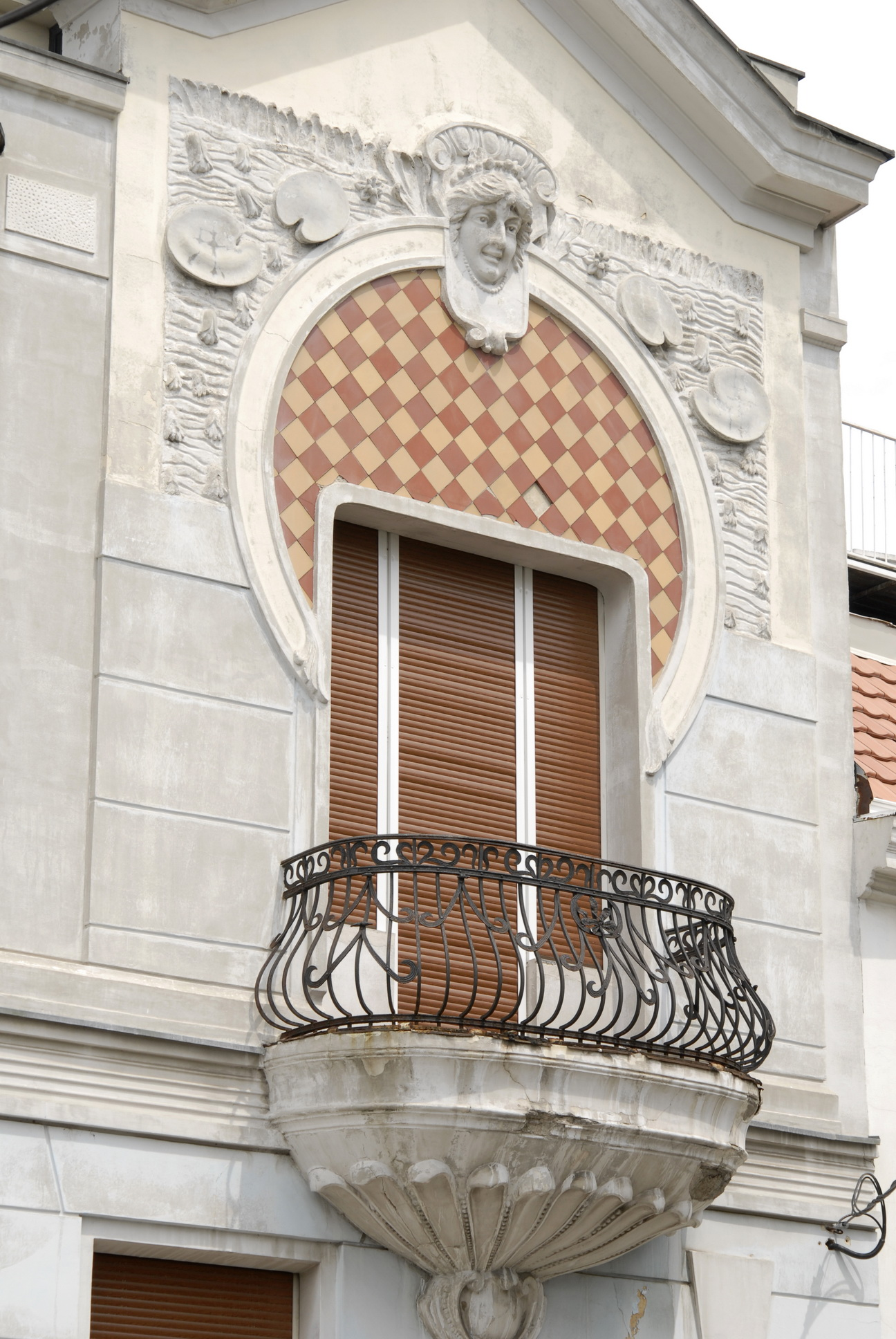
Detail of the front:
street façade

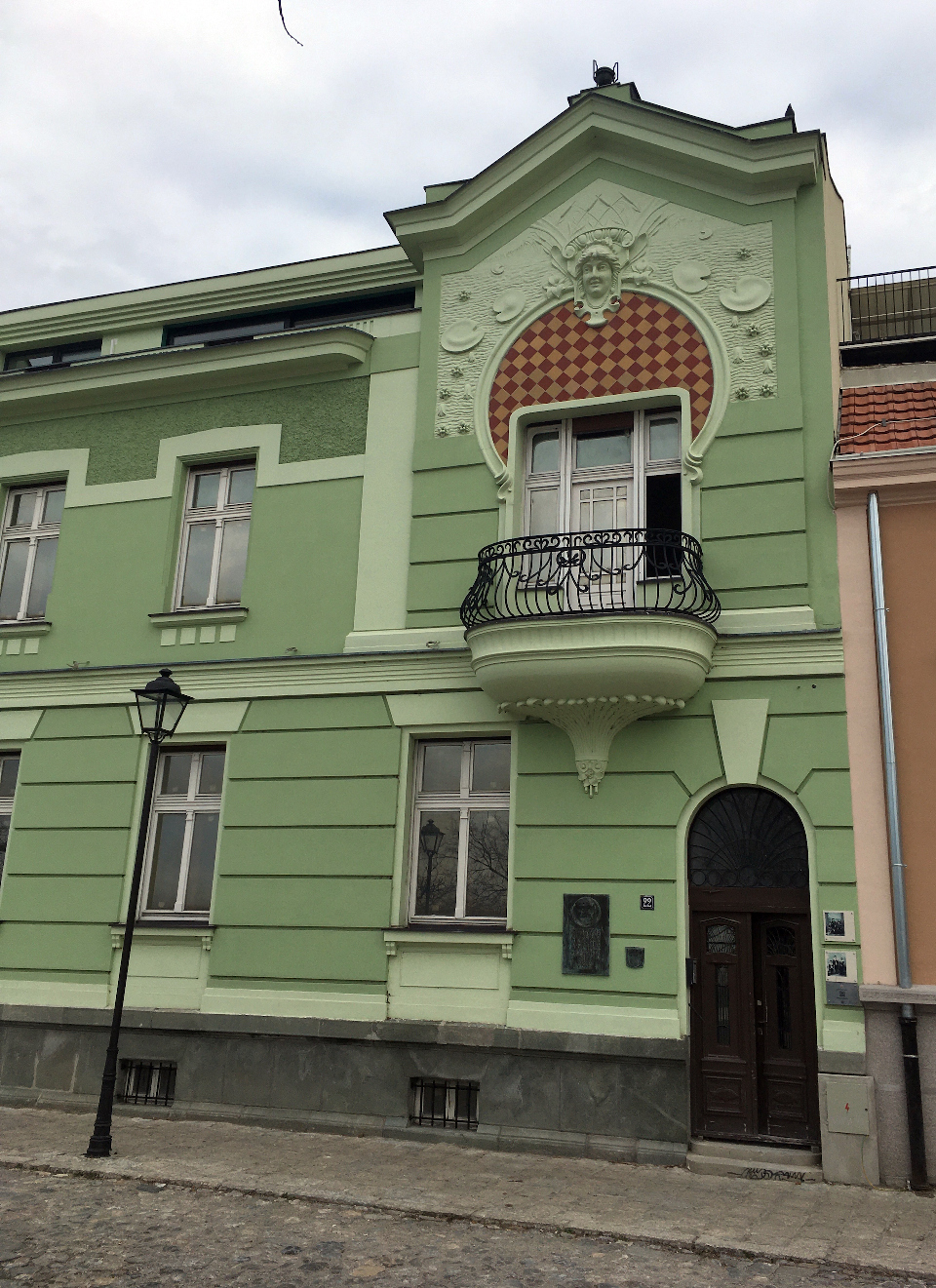
Street ambiance
