= Svetozar Radojčić =

Serbian art historian (1909–1978)

Svetozar Radojčić (Serbian Cyrillic: Светозар Радојчић; 27 May 1909 – 20 October 1978) was a Serbian art historian and academic. He played an important part in establishing the method of iconology in the second part of the 20th century.

== Biography ==
Born in Sremski Karlovci, Austria-Hungary (now Serbia), his father Nikola was a professor at the Karlovci gymnasium, where Svetozar finished primary school in 1920. The same year he began secondary education in Ljubljana, where his father was employed at the Ljubljana University. Upon completion of art studies, he studied archaeology at the Ljubljana University between 1928 and 1932. In 1930–31 he also studied at the Zagreb University and summer school at the Archaeology Institute in Feistritz (Bistrica). He also studied at Vienna and Prague (Institute of N. P. Kondakov and Karlov University), and in 1933 worked at archaeological sites and museums in Venice, Aquileia and Grado. His doctoral thesis Portreti srpskih vladara u srednjem veku ("Portraits of Serbian rulers in the Middle Ages") was defended in Ljubljana on 30 October 1934, and it was published the same year in Skopje as a publication of the Museum of South Serbia. After World War II, he participated in the re-establishment of the Department of Art History at the University of Belgrade's Faculty of philosophy. He studied Serbian medieval portraits and Serbian art under Ottoman rule. Many questions that he raised in his writings were later the subject of study by his former students and disciples.

== Selected works ==
- Портрети српских владара у средњем веку [Portraits of Serbian rulers in the Middle Ages] (2nd ed.). Belgrade. 1996.
- "Узори и дела старих српских уметника" [Models and works of Old Serbian artists]. СКЗ. 457. Belgrade. 1975.
- Старо српско сликарство [Old Serbian painting]. Belgrade: Нолит. 1966.
- Текстови и фреске [Texts and Frescos]. Novi Sad: Матица српска. 1965.
- Stare srpske minijature [Old Serbian miniatures]. Belgrade: Naučna knjiga. 1950.
- Портрети српских владара у средњем веку [Portraits of Serbian rulers in the Middle Ages]. Skoplje: Музеј Јужне Србије. 1934.

== See also ==
- Milan Kašanin
