= Karl Krumbacher =

German scholar of the Byzantine Empire (1856–1909)

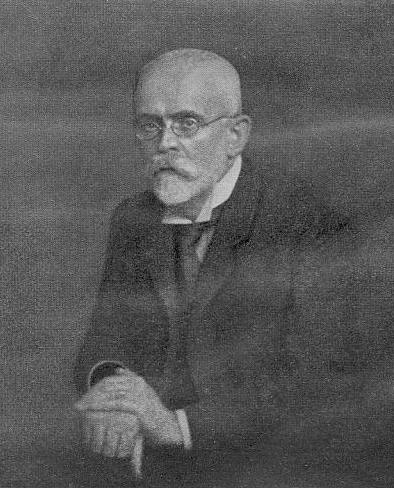
Karl Krumbacher

Karl Krumbacher (23 September 1856 – 12 December 1909) was a German scholar who was an expert on Byzantine Greek language, literature, history and culture. He was one of the principal founders of Byzantine Studies as an independent academic discipline in modern universities.

== Life and career ==
Krumbacher was born at Kürnach im Allgäu in the Kingdom of Bavaria. He studied Classical Philology and Indo-European linguistics at the Ludwig-Maximilians-Universität München and Leipzig University. In 1879, he passed the State Exam (Staatsexamen) and was thereafter active as a school teacher until 1891. In 1883, he obtained his doctorate (Promotion) and in 1885 his Habilitation in Medieval and Modern Greek philology. From 1897 he was professor of Medieval and Modern Greek Language and Literature at the Ludwig-Maximilians-Universität München and held the newly created Chair of Byzantine Studies, the first professorial chair in this subject in the world. Krumbacher founded the Byzantinische Zeitschrift (1892), the oldest academic journal of Byzantine Studies, and the Byzantinisches Archiv (1898). His collaborator at the time was Božidar Prokić, the renowned Belgrade Byzantinist. He died in Munich in 1909. His successor as Professor of Byzantine Studies was August Heisenberg, father of physicist Werner Heisenberg.

His most important work is Geschichte der byzantinischen Litteratur von Justinian bis zum Ende des oströmischen Reiches (527-1453) (History of Byzantine Literature from Justinian to the Fall of the East Roman Empire) in 1891. A second edition was published in 1897, with the collaboration of Albert Ehrhard (section on theology) and Heinrich Gelzer (general sketch of Byzantine history, AD 395–1453). The value of the work was greatly enhanced by its lengthy bibliographies and it remained a standard textbook for decades.

Krumbacher's extensive travels in Greece and the Ottoman Empire became the basis of his Griechische Reise (1886). His notable works include studies of the poetry of Michael Glykas (1894) and Kassia (1897) and Populäre Aufsätze (1900). In Das Problem der neugriechischen Schriftsprache (1902) he strongly opposed the efforts of the Katharevousa purists to introduce the classical style into modern Greek language and literature. A full list of his works was published in the memorial edition of Byzantinische Zeitschrift.

== See also ==
- Alexander Kazhdan
