= Pavle Beljanski =

- Born: June 19, 1892; Veliko Gradište, Serbia
- Died: July 14, 1965 (aged 73); Belgrade, Yugoslavia
- Occupation(s): lawyer and diplomat

Pavle Beljanski (Veliko Gradište, Kingdom of Serbia, 19 June 1892 – Belgrade, Yugoslavia, 14 July 1965) was a Serbian lawyer and diplomat, art lover and great connoisseur, collector who acquired the most complete collection of Serbian paintings from the first half of the 20th century, and by giving it to Serbian people, became one of its greatest contributors.

== Biography ==
He attended high school in Belgrade, where he also studied law until the beginning of World War I, when he left for Paris. He graduated at the Sorbonne and began post-graduate studies there as well. He started his diplomatic career in Stockholm, and continued it in Warsaw, Berlin, Vienna, Paris, Rome and Belgrade. Residing in European capitals between World Wars, he was in a position to study the greatest works of art and to meet famous persons like Jovan Dučić, Ivo Andrić, Rastko Petrović, Milutin Milanković, Veljko Petrović, Isidora Sekulić, as well as the artists whose works will constitute a part of his collection: Nadežda Petrović, Milan Konjović, Kosta Hakman, Zora Petrović, Milo Milunović, Sreten Stojanović, and Jefto Perić. All this inspired his passion for collecting art. At first, he was interested in European, mostly Renaissance art, but he realized that the first-class artworks of the Old Masters were beyond his reach. While spending time with young artists, he concentrated on contemporary art. After a while, his collection of paintings, sculptures, tapestries and drawings of at that time relatively unknown authors grew into a unique collection of exquisite works of art. Tragic circumstances – the death of seven members of his family during the bombing of Svilajnac in 1944 – left Beljanski without the possibility of sharing the beauty of his collection with his dearest, so he decided to donate it to the Serbian people.

Pavle Beljanski wrote what his collection meant to him:

"Svaka od tih slika deo je mog života! Svaka od njih je prošla kroz moje srce." Each one of these paintings is part of my life! Each of them went through my heart.

== The Pavle Beljanski Memorial Collection ==
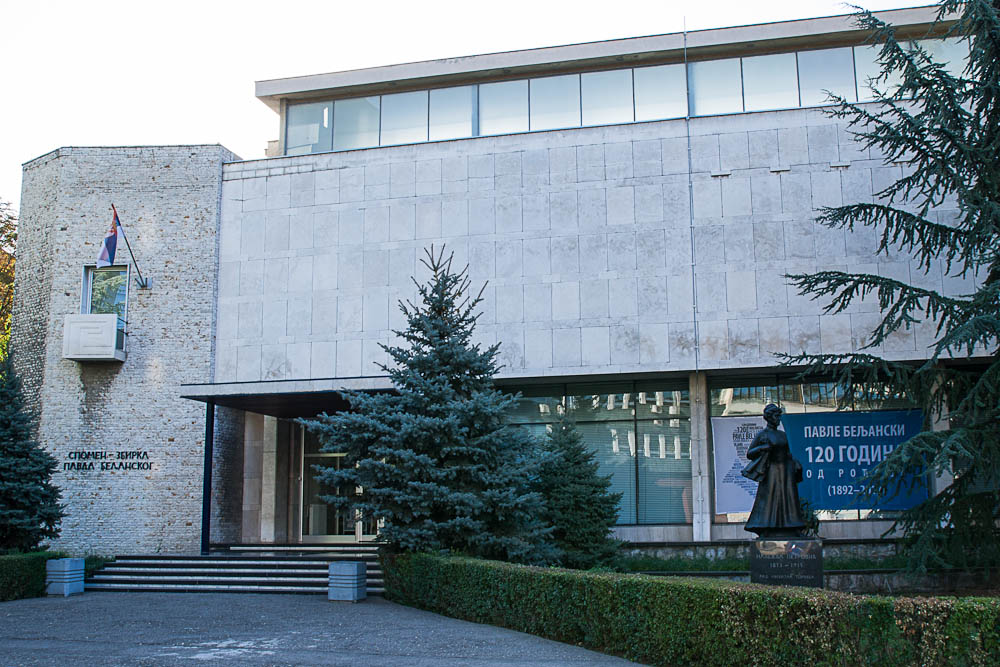
Pavle Beljanski Memorial Collection in Novi Sad

In 1957 Pavle Beljanski bequeathed his collection of 185 artworks by 37 artists to the Serbian nation by signing a Donation Contract with the Executive Council of AP Vojvodina. This collection includes some of the most important representatives of Serbian modern art.

== See also ==
- The Pavle Beljanski Memorial Collection in Novi Sad
