= Zorunovac =

- Village
- Location within Serbia
- Coordinates: 43°37′33″N 22°06′32″E
- Country: Serbia
- District: Zaječar District
- Municipality: Knjaževac

Population (2002)
  - Total: 179
- Time zone: UTC+1 (CET)
  - Summer (DST): UTC+2 (CEST)

Zorunovac is a village in the municipality of Knjaževac, Serbia. According to the census of 2002, the village had a population of 179 people.
