= Russian Archaeological Institute of Constantinople =

The Russian Archaeological Institute of Constantinople (Russian: Русский археологический институт в Константинополе) was founded in 1895 and led by two distinguished Russian Byzantinists, Fyodor Uspensky and Nikodim Kondakov. The institute carried out excavations and studies across the entire Ottoman Empire, carrying off large numbers of relics, manuscripts and other finds to Russia. Aside from its research role, the institute was from the outset intended as a statement of foreign policy, following the Russian Empire's claim to be the inheritor of the Byzantine Empire as the "Third Rome", and its long-standing ambition to conquer Istanbul from the Ottoman Empire. The institute continued to function until the outbreak of the First World War in 1914.

== Sources ==
- Papoulidis, Konstantinos (1987). Το ρωσικό Αρχαιολογικό Ινστιτούτο Κωνσταντινουπόλεως 1894–1914 (in Greek). Thessaloniki: Foundation of Balkan Studies.
- Üre, Pınar (2014). Byzantine heritage, archaeology, and politics between Russia and the Ottoman Empire: Russian Archaeological Institute in Constantinople (1894-1914) (Thesis). The London School of Economics and Political Science.
- Üre, Pınar (2020). Reclaiming Byzantium: Russia, Turkey and the Archaeological Claim to the Middle East in the 19th Century. London: I.B. Tauris.
