= Fyodor Uspensky =

Russian Byzantinist (1845–1928)

- Фёдор Ива́нович Успе́нский
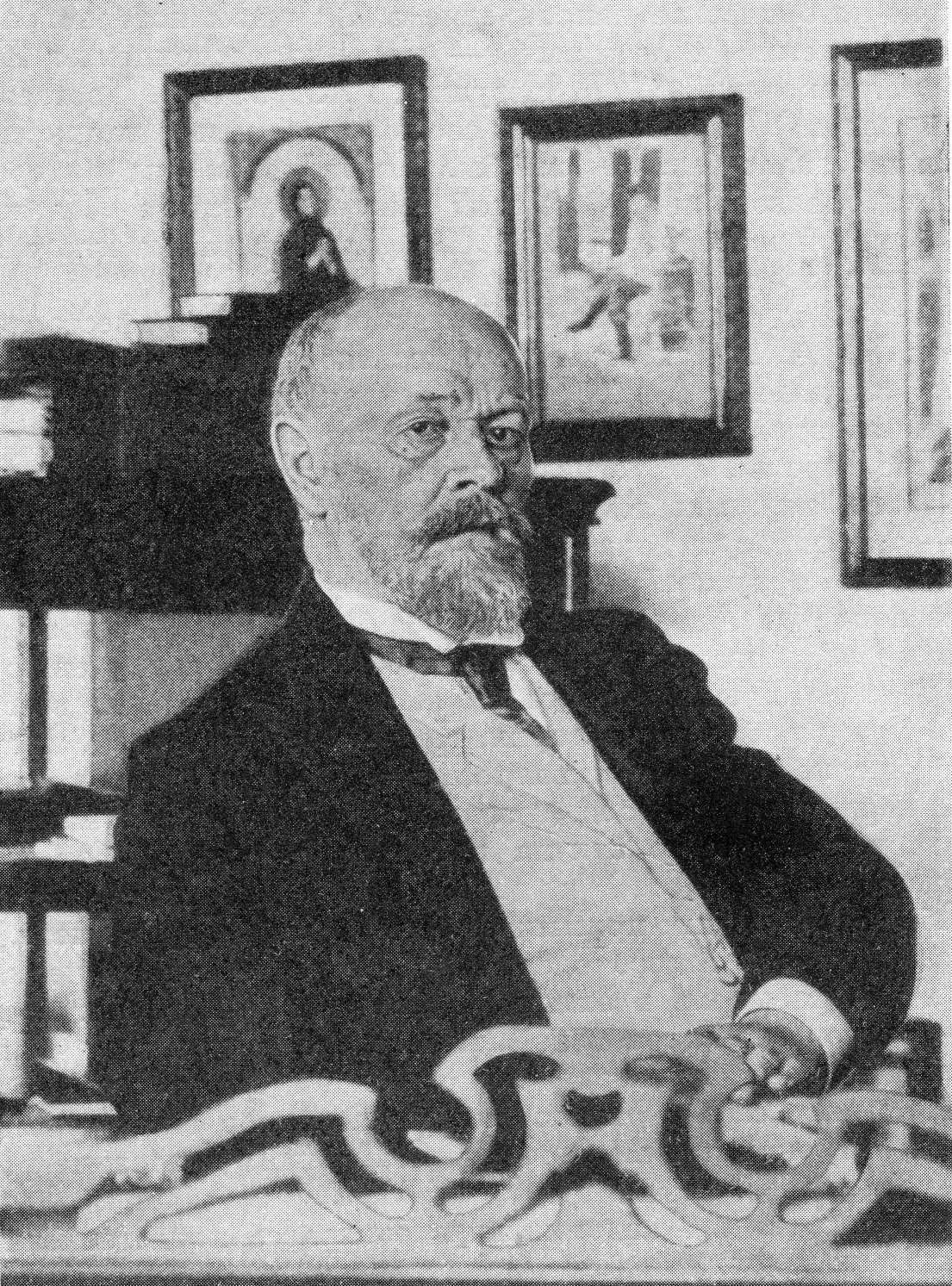
- Born: Fyodor Ivanovich Uspensky; 19 February 1845; Galich, Russian Empire
- Died: September 10, 1928 (aged 83); Leningrad, Russian SFSR, Soviet Union
- Occupation: Byzantinist

Fyodor Ivanovich Uspensky (or Uspenskij; Russian: Фёдор Ива́нович Успе́нский [ˈfʲɵdər ɨˈvanəvʲɪtɕ ʊsʲˈpʲenskʲɪj]; 19 February 1845 – 10 September 1928) was a Russian and Soviet Byzantinist. His works are considered to be among the finest illustrations of the flowering of Byzantine studies in the Russian Empire.

== Life and career ==
Uspensky was born near Galich on 19 February 1845. He was educated at the University of St. Petersburg, with his first thesis (1872) dedicated to Nicetas Choniates. For two decades (1874-1894) he read lectures at the Novorossiysky University in Odessa. This position allowed him to spend considerable time abroad.

Uspensky's doctoral thesis (1879) dealt with the foundation of the Second Bulgarian Empire. Although he specialized in the Byzantine-Bulgarian relations and investigated the Slavic influence on the Byzantine economy, Uspensky also researched and wrote extensively on the Crusades.

In 1894 Uspensky, who shared Slavophile ideals, decided to move to Constantinople to study and protect the surviving monuments of Byzantine antiquity, which had been neglected by the Ottoman authorities for centuries. He founded the Russian Archaeological Institute (headquartered at Studion) and presided over its pioneering archaeological research in Constantinople, Asia Minor, Macedonia and Bulgaria. In 1900, he was elected into the Russian Academy of Sciences. With the outbreak of World War I, Uspensky was forced to abandon his work and flee Turkey.

Back in Petrograd, the 70-year-old professor was invited to edit the organ of Byzantine studies, Vizantiyskiy Vremennik. After the October Revolution, he delivered lectures at the Leningrad University (1922–27) and, enduring criticism of the Bolshevik authorities, prepared for publication the results of a lifelong study, a monumental three-volume account of the history of the Byzantine Empire.

Uspensky died in Leningrad in 1928. The posthumous publication of his magnum opus, based on numerous unpublished sources and unprecedented in scope, demonstrated the wide range of his scholarship. His book about the Trapezuntine Empire also appeared posthumously. The Taktikon Uspensky is named after him.
