= Alexander Soloviev (historian) =

Russian émigré jurist, slavist and historian

Alexander Vasilyevich Soloviev
- Born: Александр Васильевич Соловьёв; September 6, 1890; Kalisz, Russian Empire
- Died: January 15, 1971 (aged 80); Geneva, Switzerland
- Citizenship: Russian, Yugoslavian, Swiss
- Occupation: Academic
- Spouse: Natalya Rayevskaya
- Children: Alexander Alexandrovich Soloviev

Academic background
- Education: Imperial Warsaw University

Academic work
- Institutions: University of Rostov-on-Don; Belgrade University; Sarajevo Law School; University of Geneva

Alexander Vasilievich Soloviev (Russian: Алекса́ндр Васи́льевич Соловьёв; Serbian: Александар Соловјев; 1890–1971) was a Russian émigré jurist, slavist, and historian of Serbia and Serbian law. His academic activity included research on the Bogumils, Serbian heraldry, philately and archeology, and he also published translations from Russian and French into Serbian. Having fled from Russia not long after the October Revolution, he settled in the Kingdom of Serbs, Croats and Slovenes, where he became a professor at the University of Belgrade Faculty of Law (1920-1936). After the end of World War II he briefly served as the first dean of the Sarajevo Law School (1947-1949), before Communist repression forced him to emigrate to Switzerland, where he worked as professor of Slavic studies at the University of Geneva (1951-1961).

== Biography ==
Alexander Vasilievich Soloviev was born in 1890 in Kalisz, Congress Poland, part of the Russian Empire, where his father Vasili Fyodorovich Soloviev was a judge at the Appellate Court in Warsaw. Alexander studied at the Imperial Warsaw University, where he graduated in law in 1912 and historico-philological studies in 1915. In 1918 he became a lecturer in Slavic law in the University of Rostov on Don, constituted during World War I on the basis of the Imperial Warsaw University after the latter was evacuated due to the German occupation of Russian territories.

After the defeat of the White movement in the Russian Civil War, Soloviev, alongside tens of thousands of other White Russians, moved to the Kingdom of Serbs, Croats and Slovenes, where king Alexander, who had grown up in Imperial Russia, was welcoming to the Russian emigration. From 1920 to 1946 he was a professor at the University of Belgrade, where he received his doctorate in 1928 for his thesis on the 14th-century king and legislator Stefan Uroš IV Dušan of Serbia. At the same time, he taught Russian and Russian literature at the First Russo-Serbian Gymnasium in the Serbian capital. In Belgrade he also married Natalya Rayevskaya, a fellow White Russian émigré in the Yugoslav kingdom.

After the Second World War he was named dean of the newly created University of Sarajevo Faculty of Law from 1947 to 1949, but after the complete communist takeover in the Yugoslavia, the Tito–Stalin split and the beginning of Informbiro period, he and his wife were arrested and imprisoned in 1949. After their release, Soloviev and his family moved abroad once again, this time to Switzerland, where he became professor of Slavic studies and Byzantine history at the University of Geneva (1951–1961). He died on 15 January 1971 in Geneva.

For a short time, he also lectured at the University of Lwow, where he published his research on Dušan's Code in Polish.

His son Alexander worked at the Library of Congress in Washington, D.C.

== Selected bibliography ==
- Selected Monuments of Serbian Law from the 12th to 15th centuries (1926)
- Legislation of Stefan Dušan, emperor of Serbs and Greeks (1928)
- Dušan's Code in - 1349 and 1354 (1929)
- Greek Charters of Serbian Rulers (1936)
- Lectures from the History of Serbian Law (1939)
- History of Serbian Coat of Arms (1958)
