= Aleksandar Despić =

Serbian physicist and academic

Aleksandar Despić (January 6, 1927–April 7, 2005) was a Serbian physicist and academic. Despić received his PhD degree from the Imperial College of Science and Technology, London. He was a professor at the Faculty of Technology, University of Belgrade and his scientific interests include fundamental and applied electrochemistry. He was the President of the Serbian Academy of Sciences and Arts from 1994 to 1998.

== Selected works ==
1. A.R.Despic, K.I.Popov, Transport Controlled Deposition and Dissolution of Metals, Modern Aspects of Electrochemistry, Plenum Press, New York, 1972, Vol.7, Ch.4
2. A.R.Despic, Deposition and Dissolution of Metals and Alloys, part B: Mechanism, Kinetics, Texture and Morphology, in: Comprehensive Treatise on Electrochemιstry, ed. J.O.M.Bockris, B.E.Conway, E.Yeager, Plenum Press, New York, 1983, Vol.7, Ch.7b
3. A.Despic, V.Parkhutik, Electrochemistry of Aluminium in Aqueous Solutions and Physics of Its Anodic Oxides, in: Modern Aspects of Electrochemistry, ed. J.O.M.Bockris, R.E.White, B.E.Conway, Plenum Press, New York, 1989, Vol.20, Ch.6.
4. A.R.Despic, The use of aluminium in energy conversion and storage, in: Chemistry and Energy - I, ed.C.A.C.Sequeira, Sintra (Portugal), 1990. (Materials science monographs, 65.)
5. A.R.Despic, V.D.Jovic, Electrochemical Deposition and Dissolution of Alloys and Metal Composites - Fundamentals Aspects, Modern Aspects of Electrochemistry, Plenum Press, New York, 1995, Vol.27, Ch.2.

== Sources ==
- Serbian Academy of Sciences and Arts)

== See also ==
- Pavle Simić
- Milan Vukcevich
- Bogdan Đuričić
- Ljubisav Rakić
- Ivan Gutman
- Sima Lozanić
- Marko Leko
- Mihailo Rašković
- Jivojin Jocic
- Aleksandar M. Leko
- Milivoje Lozanić
- Dejan Popović Jekić
- Panta Tutundžić
- Vukić Mićović
- Persida Ilić
- Svetozar Lj. Jovanović
- Djordje K. Stefanović

Academic offices
Preceded by Dušan Kanazir	President of Serbian Academy of Sciences and Arts; 1994–1998	Succeeded by Dejan Medaković
