= Živojin Jocić =

Serbian organic chemist

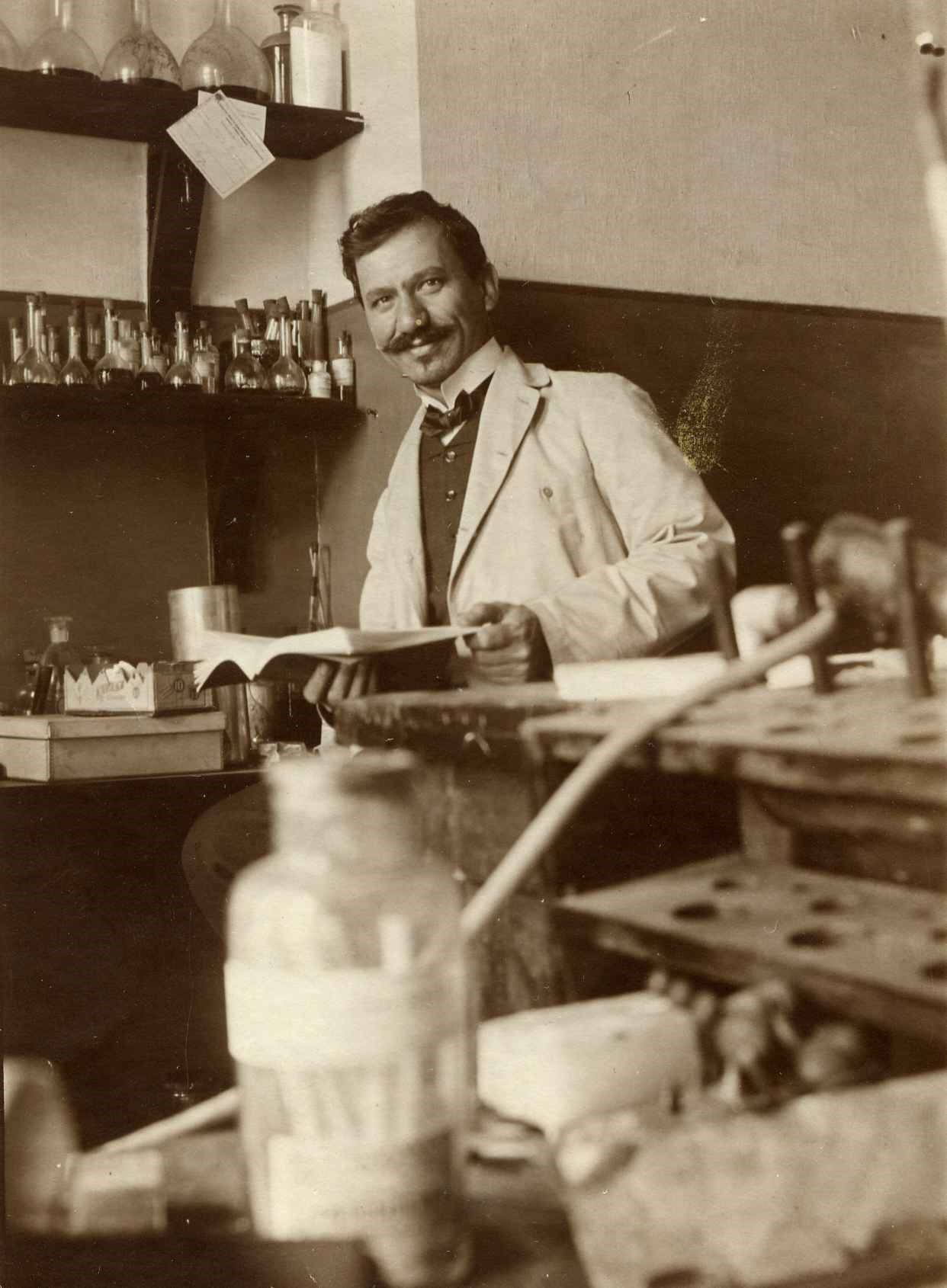
Živojin Jocić

Živojin Jocić (6 October 1870 in Paraćin – 23 January 1914 in Belgrade) was a Serbian organic chemist.

Jocić studied chemistry at the University of Petrograd in Imperial Russia. After his graduation in 1898, he stayed at the university and worked as an assistant. His teacher was Alexey Favorsky. In a relatively short time – between 1897 and 1911 – he published a large number of papers in organic chemistry, for the most part dealing with the synthesis of acetylene hydrocarbons and synthesis by means of Grignard reagent.

He discovered the Jocic reaction, which involves nucleophilic displacement of the hydroxyl group in a 1,1,1-trichloro-2-hydroxyalkyl structure with concomitant conversion of the trichloromethyl portion to a carboxylic acid or similar functional group.

== See also ==
- Sima Lozanić
- Marko Leko
- Mihailo Rašković
- Milivoje Lozanić
- Dejan Popović Jekić
- Panta Tutundžić
- Vukić Mićović
- Svetozar Lj. Jovanović
