= Sava Urošević =

Serbian geologist and academic (1863–1930)

Sava Urošević (Vrmdža, Sokobanja, Serbia, 13 January 1863 - Belgrade, Serbia, Kingdom of Yugoslavia 14 September 1930) was a Serbian mineralogist, geologist, rector of the University of Belgrade, and a member of the Serbian Academy of Sciences and Arts and many other professional organizations, including the Chemical Society. He is recognized as one of Serbia's most renowned scientists in his field.

== Biography ==
He graduated from the Natural Sciences and Mathematics Department of the Velika škola in 1884 in Belgrade, and then from 1885 to 1888, he studied at the Sorbonne in Paris. From 1889 he was an associate professor and then professor of mineralogy and petrography at the University of Belgrade, where he taught until 1928.

He was elected a member of the Royal Serbian Academy of Sciences in 1909. He left a large number of scientific papers, mostly published in SANU and Geological Annals of the Balkan Peninsula, as well as a large number of professional papers in the National Geological Society of Serbia. The largest number of papers refers to the study of the terrain of crystalline shales, granites and contact-metamorphic phenomena in Serbia. In addition to university textbooks in mineralogy, he wrote the popular scientific book Precious Metals and Precious Stones (SKZ, Poučnik II, 1925).

He was married to Cleopatra, the daughter of politician Nikola Hristić.

== Literature ==
Text by Dr. Kosta Petković, university professor at the University of Belgrade, in the "Encyclopedia of Yugoslavia" JLZ Zagreb 1971. volume 8, p. 436.

== See also ==
- Jovan Cvijić
- Jovan Žujović
- Svetolik Radovanović
- Vladimir K. Petković
- Jelenko Mihailović
- Milorad Dimitrijević-Kvaks
- Stevan Karamata
- Marko Leko
- Aleksandar Popović Sandor
- Milan Nedeljković (1857-1950)
