= Petar Pavlović (geologist) =

Serbian geologist (1864–1938)

Petar Pavlović (Požarevac, Serbia, 28 June 1864 – Belgrade, Kingdom of Yugoslavia, 5 August 1938) was a Serbian geologist, also a member of the Serbian Academy of Sciences and Arts, lecturer at the Velika škola and a long-time director of the Museum of Natural History, Belgrade.

== Biography ==
Petar Pavlović was born in Požarevac to Colonel Stojko Pavlović and Jelena "Lena" Lunjevica, daughter of Nikola Lunjevica, the Serbian revolutionary leader. After graduating from Belgrade's Velika škola, he went abroad to pursue further studies in geology and palaeontology. Upon his return to Serbia he was offered the post of director of the Museum of Natural History.

== Geology in Serbia ==
The study of modern geology in Serbia began to develop in the first half of the 19th century mainly for two reasons: the endeavours of Prince Miloš Obrenović to expand the national economy (including mining) and the interest shown by European scientists for a country, newly liberated from the Ottoman yoke. When in 1880 Jovan Žujović became the professor of geology and mineralogy at the Velika škola in Belgrade, as the first Serbian geologist who studied in Belgrade and Paris, the development of geology in Serbia was strongly increased. Zujović's successors: Sava Urošević (mineralogy, petrology), Svetolik Radovanović (palaeontology), Petar Pavlović (palaeontology), Vladimir Petković (regional geology), Jelenko Mihailović (seismology) and others continued geological investigations in Serbia.

== See also ==
- Jovan Žujović
- Jovan Cvijić
- Stevan Karamata
- Marko Leko
- Aleksandar Popović Sandor
- Vladimir K. Petković
