= Svetolik Radovanović =

Serbian geologist

Svetolik Radovanović (Prćilovica, Serbia, 23 March 1863 – Belgrade, Kingdom of Yugoslavia, 17 July 1928) was a Serbian state geologist, a member of the Serbian Royal Academy, a professor at the University of Belgrade, and the Minister of National Economy of the Kingdom of Serbia (1904-1905). With Jovan Žujović, he began collecting data on earthquakes, therefore, initiating the development of seismology in Serbia.

== Career ==
At the election assembly on 5 February 1897, he was elected a corresponding member of the Serbian Royal Academy (SANU), and on 31 January 1902, he became a regular member. He is the founder of Serbian hydrogeology. He reformed the Serbian mining and forestry legislation, and in 1892, together with the geologist Jovan Žujović, he founded the Serbian Geological Society. As a minister, he passed the first rules of the mining and fraternal treasury for the insurance of miners, established Sunday-holiday schools for apprentices and issued the first yearbook of the mining department of the Ministry of Economy. His works on the study of Jurassic creations in eastern Serbia are well known.

== Works (partial list) ==
- Uvod u geologiju istočne Srbije (Introduction to the geology of eastern Serbia);
- O tercijeru Timočke krajine (On the Tertiary of the Timok Region);
- O trusu
- Podzemne vode(Underground waters);
- Lijas kod Rgotine (Lijas near Rgotina);
- Lijas kod Dobre (Lijas near Dobra);
- Crnajka s naročitim obzirom na njen Doger;
- Donjolijaska fauna sa Vrške Čuke (Lower Lija fauna from Vrška Čuk);
- Kelovej kod Vrške Čuke (Kelovej near Vrška Čuka);
- Belemnites ferraginensis nov. spec. iz klauskih slojeva istočne Srbije (Belemnites ferraginensis nov. spec. from the Klaus strata of eastern Serbia);
- O velikom šarijažu u istočnoj Srbiji (On the Great Sharia in Eastern Serbia).

== Literature ==
- Small Encyclopedia of Education - General Encyclopedia (A-L). Publishing company Prosveta, Belgrade, 1959.

== See also ==
- Jovan Cvijić
- Ljubomir Klerić
- Petar Pavlović
- Jovan Žujović
- Vladimir K. Petković
- Sava Urošević
- Aleksandar Popović Sandor
- Jelenko Mihailović
- Stevan Karamata
- Marko Leko
- Milan Nedeljković (1857-1950)
