= Svetozar Lj. Jovanović =

Serbian chemist and assistant professor of chemistry

Svetozar Lj. Jovanović (1895–1951) was a Serbian chemist and assistant professor of chemistry from 1925 to 1941. He specialized in the field of analytical chemistry.

Jovanović developed a new electroanalytical method for the quantitative determination of antimony and a method for the separation of copper from zinc by rapid electrolysis. He studied the gravrimetric determination of problems, such as the manufacture of drugs and, in particular, the practical utilization of the country's paraffin shales. He co-authored with Momir Jovanović a book on Principles of Qualitative Chemical Analysis (Serbian: Kvalitativna hemijska aanaliza). He also wrote an article for a Serbian medical journal titled "Diagnostic evaluation of Vidal's reaction".

== See also ==
- Vukić Mićović
- Djordje K. Stefanović
- Pavle Savić
- Marko Leko
- Aleksandar Zega
- Dejan Popović Jekić
- Zivojin Jocic
