= Helen Losanitch Frothingham =

Serbian humanitarian aid worker, women's rights activist, nurse and writer

- Јелена Лозанић
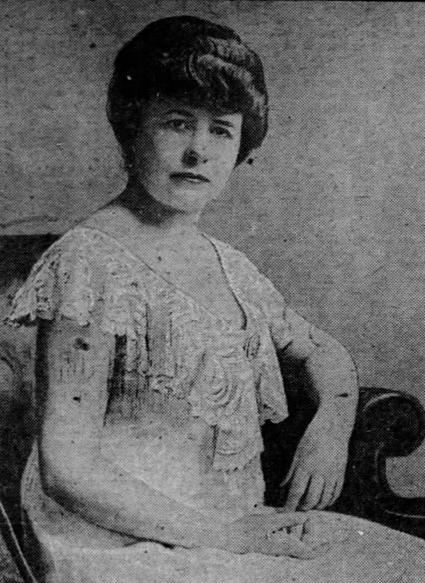
- Frothingham, 1921
- Born: Jelena Lozanić; 12 March 1885; Belgrade, Kingdom of Serbia
- Died: 6 February 1972 (aged 86); France
- Other names: Helen Frothingham, Helen Losanitch, Ellen Losanitch, Helène Losanitch, Jelena Lozanić Frothingham
- Occupations: humanitarian activist, nurse, suffragist
- Years active: 1910-1950s
- Spouse: John W. Frothingham (m. 1921; died 1935)
- Children: 1
- Father: Sima Lozanić
- Relatives: Milivoje S. Lozanić (brother); Ana Marinković (sister)
- Family: Vučić-Perišić family

Helen Losanitch Frothingham (Serbian Cyrillic: Јелена Лозанић Фротингхам; 12 March 1885 – 6 February 1972) was a Serbian humanitarian aid worker, women's rights activist, nurse and writer. During World War I, she travelled from Serbia to the United States to secure relief packages from donors to help soldiers and orphans. When the war ended, she established an orphanage in Guéthary, France to care for orphans of the Spanish Civil War. She was honoured for her service with Serbia's highest award, the Order of the White Eagle.

== Early life ==
Jelena Lozanić was born on 12 March 1885 in Belgrade, Kingdom of Serbia to Stanka (née Pačić) and Sima Lozanić. Her mother was related to the Vučić Perišić family and her father was a Serbian chemist, president of the Serbian Royal Academy, and the first rector of the University of Belgrade, who also served as a minister of foreign affairs, minister of industry and diplomat. She was the youngest of three siblings after Milivoje S. Lozanić (1878-1963), who would become an academic and chemist and Ana, later Marinković (1881-1973), who would become a noted painter.

== Activism ==
In 1910, Lozanić became the foreign-corresponding secretary of the National Serbian Women's Alliance (Serbian Cyrillic: Српски народни женски савез). That same year, she attended The Second International Conference of Socialist Women in Copenhagen, as a delegate for the Serbian Women's Council. Attending the 1911 International Woman Suffrage Alliance (IWSA)'s 6th Congress in Stockholm, Lozanić was drawn to discussions of women's education and the links between women's issues and teaching in Serbia.

Between 1912 and 1913 during the Balkan Wars, Lozanić worked in "Saint Helena" orphanage and completed a nursing course to assist with tending the wounded at a convalescent center in Vračar. On 4 February 1913, she wrote a letter regretting the inability of the National Serbian Women's Alliance to send delegates to the IWSA conference to be held that year in Budapest because of a diplomatic incident between Hungarians and Serbs earlier in the year. The masthead shows her name in cyrillic script and in French, as Helène Losanitch, but she signed the letter as Ellen.

In 1914, with the invasion of Serbia by Austria during World War I, Losanitch fled with her family to the wartime capital in Niš. Working at a hospital there, in November 1914, the Serbian Red Cross appointed her as a representative to secure humanitarian aid from the United States. She traveled in January 1915, making stops throughout the U. S. and Canada. Losanitch returned to Serbia only to participate with her family in the Albanian retreat across the Prokletije Mountains. Setting up an organization, known as the Serbian Child Welfare association, Losanitch made three trips to the Americas between 1915 and 1920 to raise funds and supplies to assist refugees, with food, clothing and medical supplies to combat typhus and tuberculosis. She also worked with the Committee for the Relief of Serbia, located in California and northern France to secure dairy cattle and grain for Serbian farmers.

At home in Serbia, Losanitch was very active in setting up field hospitals. When the war ended, she was appointed to head the State Assistance Committee, and primarily focused on establishing homes for war orphans. She returned to the United States and met John Whipple Frothingham, an American Red Cross worker who had been sent to Serbia Between 1917 and 1919. Working together, the two established the Frothingham Children's Institute in Serbia and founded the Serbo-American Institute of Serbia. For her humanitarian work, she was decorated in 1920 with the Order of the White Eagle, Serbia's highest honor.

By the end of 1920, Losanitch and Frothingham were engaged and the couple married on 3 January 1921 in a double ceremony held at the St. Nicholas Russian Orthodox Cathedral in Manhattan and the Church of the Saviour in Brooklyn. After their marriage, the couple continued to work together on humanitarian projects, living part of the year at their home in Greenburgh, Westchester County, New York, where their daughter Anna was born in 1923, and part of the year at an estate in Guéthary in the Basque Country of France. During the Spanish Civil War, the couple used their home in Guéthary as an orphanage and center to help reunite separated children with their families. Both Frothingham's father and husband died in 1935, and she and her daughter returned to Greenburgh.

In 1941 Frothingham founded the Committee of American Friends of Yugoslavia, which would later become the Yugoslav Relief Fund. In the late 1940s she relocated her home to Greenwich, Connecticut and resumed travel between the United States and France. In 1970, she published Mission for Serbia: Letters from America and Canada, a collection of her letters which had been sent to her family during the six years she traveled doing war relief work during the First World War.

== Death and legacy ==
Frothingham died in France on 6 February 1972 and is remembered as an example of patriotism and service in Serbia.
