= Ana Marinković =

Serbian painter and nurse

- Ана Лозанић Маринковић
- Lozanić, circa 1903-1904 by Milan Jovanović
- Born: Ana Lozanić; 7 April 1881; Belgrade, Kingdom of Serbia
- Died: 30 May 1973 (aged 92); Guéthary, France
- Occupations: nurse, artist
- Years active: 1908–1973

Ana Marinković (Serbian Cyrillic: Ана Маринковић, Belgrade, Kingdom of Serbia, 7 April 1881 ― Guéthary, France, 30 May 1973) was a well-known Serbian artist from the turn of the century until the outbreak of World War II. She has paintings housed in the permanent collections of the Belgrade City Museum, the Museum of Contemporary Art in Belgrade, the National Museum of Serbia, and other locations both in Serbia and abroad.

== Early life ==
Ana Lozanić was born on 7 April 1881 in Belgrade, Kingdom of Serbia to Stanka (née Pačić) and Sima Lozanić. Her father was a chemist, professor, and rector of the Velika škola (later changed to University of Belgrade). He also was president of the Serbian Royal Academy and served in various posts in the Serbian government. Her mother was related to the Vučić-Perišić family and Ana was the middle child of three siblings, including her older brother Milivoje (1878-1963) and younger sister Jelena, later Helen Frothingham (1885-1972).

Lozanić completed her primary and secondary schooling in Belgrade, where she studied art with Nadežda Petrović. She went on to take private art lessons with Rista and Beta Vukanović before she went abroad to further her art studies privately in London and Paris. In 1908, she held her first exhibit, with the students of the School of Arts and Crafts, and received praise for her works from Serbian literary magazines. Before the end of the decade, she married Vojislav Marinković, a Serbian economist and politician.

== Career ==
In 1910, Marinković was invited as a guest artist to exhibit with the Lada Art Society, a group founded by the Vukanovićs, and became a member of the society in 1911. When the Balkan Wars broke out in 1912, Marinković joined her art teachers Petrović and Vukanović as a volunteer nurse in the Army Medical Corps. During World War I, she accompanied her patients as they made the Albanian retreat across the Prokletije Mountains, taking them safely to Corfu. Among the other painters who accompanied the Medical Corps was Kosta Miličević, whose impressionistic style influenced Marinković's later works.

In 1919, Marinković became one of the founders of the Association of Fine Artists of Serbia (Serbian: Удружење ликовних уметника Србије/Udruženje Likovnih Umetnika Srbije (ULUS)) and around the same time helped found the Cvijeta Zuzorić Association to promote artistic endeavors in Belgrade. Her works, along with Ljubomir Ivanović, Kosta Miličević, and Borivoje Stefanović, the group of "Belgrade Impressionists," and Mihailo Milovanović among other Yugoslav artists were exhibited in the Fifth South Slav Exhibition in Belgrade in 1922. Years later, she had major exhibits in Turin and Sofia before World War II.

Because of the wealth and influence of her family, Marinković did not have to take in students to support her art and was able to paint still-life, interiors and landscapes, primarily of surroundings of Belgrade, at her leisure. She also worked in voluntary endeavors with Queen Marija Karađorđević helping poor women and their children. In 1935 her father, Sima Lozanić, died on 7 July; her husband, Vojislav Marinković, died on 18 September; and her brother-in-law, John Frothingham, a former International Red Cross official during World War I and husband of her sister Jelena, also died on 20 November.

During the Nazi-occupation of Belgrade, Marinković lived a quiet and solitary life. When the war ended and the communists came into power, she decided to leave the country. She moved to the seaside town of Guéthary on the southwestern coast of France, where her sister had established an orphanage. She lived modestly painting landscapes until the 1970s and near the end of her life donated several paintings from her private collection by Paja Jovanović and Kosta Miličević to the National Museum of Serbia.

== Death and legacy ==
Marinković died on 30 May 1973 in Guéthary. She has paintings in the permanent collections of the Belgrade City Museum, the Museum of Contemporary Art in Belgrade, the National Museum of Serbia, and other locations both in Serbia and abroad. Some of her works, together with Zora Petrović, Nadežda Petrović, and other women artists who were Serbian Red Cross volunteers, are on display alongside each other in the Pavle Beljanski Memorial Collection. Their art bears stylistic similarities, such as expressionist, dramatic, emotional and colorful paintings.

== See also ==
- List of painters from Serbia
- War artist
