= Mihailo Rašković =

Chemist

Mihailo Raskovic

Mihailo Rašković (1827 - 3 October 1872) was a Serbian chemist. He worked as a professor at the Belgrade Lyceum and the Velika škola. He is best remembered in Serbia as one of the fathers of modern Serbian chemistry along with Sima Lozanić and Marko Leko.

Rašković was a corresponding member of the Serbian Learned Society, becoming a regular member since 13 January 1857. He was a corresponding member of the Serbian Royal Academy. He was a regular member of the Department of Science and Mathematics, appointed on 29 July 1864. He served as Secretary of the Department of Science, Science and Mathematics (SUD) in 1867 and 1868.

== Early life ==
Mihailo Rašković was born in Titel, Austrian Empire, and educated in Budapest, Prague, and Chemnitz. He earned his doctorate in chemistry at Pšibran. He was the first professor of chemistry educated abroad on the staff of the Belgrade Lyceum, then the highest learning institution in the Principality of Serbia, which eventually became the University of Belgrade.

== Career ==
The Lycée was founded in 1838 in Kragujevac. Initially it had two departments: Philosophy and Jurisprudence. In Belgrade, in 1853 a Natural and Technical Department was established, which included chemistry. That same year, Rašković began to teach inorganic and organic chemistry and chemical technology and to hold experiments and exercises and founded the chemical laboratory. Rašković's laboratory was initially called Chemical Workshop but the name was changed to Chemical Laboratory when the Belgrade Lyceum became Velika škola in 1863 and was moved from the Residence of Princess Ljubica to Captain Miša's Mansion. The name remained until 1906 when the laboratory was renamed Hemijski zavod (institute) and later Hemijski Institut (Chemical Institute).

Although Rašković was not involved in research due to lack of resources, he did prepare the foundations "for the years to come. He established and introduced the first consistent chemical terminology in Serbia".

He died in Belgrade, Principality of Serbia. After his death, in 1872, Sima Lozanić succeeded him.

== Sources ==
- Sarić, Miloje (1996), "Life and work of Serbian scientists", Belgrade: SANU. ISBN 978-86-7025-231-8

== See also ==
- Milan Nedeljković
- Aleksandar Popović Sandor
