= Vukić Mićović =

Serbian chemist, professor and dean

Vukić Mićović (Serbian: Вукић Мићовић; Bare Kraljske, near Andrijevica, Montenegro, 1 January 1896 – Belgrade, Serbia, Yugoslavia, 19 January 1981) was a Serbian chemist, professor and dean of the Faculty of Natural Sciences and Mathematics in Belgrade, rector of the University of Belgrade and academician of SANU.

== Biography ==
He was born in Kraljske Bare, near Andrijevica, on 1 January 1896, to father Milonja and mother Ružica, née Novović. He finished primary school in his native village (1903–1907), and three grades of the lower grammar school in Podgorica (1907–1910), where he sat on a bench with Risto Stijović. He continued his education in Belgrade, where he finished the grades from the fourth to the seventh (1910–1914) in the Second Men's Gymnasium. The First World War prevented him from finishing the eighth grade of high school because he joined the military in 1914 as a student sergeant in the Royal Battalion in Montenegro. In June 1916, he was taken prisoner in Hungary, where he spent time in the camp until 23 December 1918. In 1919, he finished the eighth grade of the Second Men's Gymnasium in Belgrade, passed the matriculation exam and enrolled at the Faculty of Philosophy, departments of chemistry and physics.

He was a professor in the Faculty of Natural Sciences and Mathematics in Belgrade. In 1921, he became the first assistant professor of chemistry, as a student, and after graduating in 1922, he became a teaching assistant. He worked on his doctoral dissertation for two years at the Institute of Chemistry of the University of Nancy (1926–1928) as a scholarship holder of the French government, with Professor Vavon. He received his doctorate in July 1928 and stayed in Nancy for another year to complete his research and work. After that, he spent a year in London doing scientific work in the Chemistry Laboratory of the University College London with Nobel Laureate Robert Robertson as a scholarship holder of the Serbian Support Fund. He returned to Belgrade in October 1930. He was elected assistant professor in 1931 and associate professor in 1938. Immediately after the war, only professors Milivoje Lozanić and Vukić Mićović and assistant Sergije Lebedev were at the Department of Chemistry. He became a full professor in 1950. He was the director of the Chemical Institute in the period 1949–1960. He retired in 1966, and from 1945 until his retirement he was the head of the Department of Chemistry at the Faculty of Natural Sciences and Mathematics.

He was the dean of the Faculty of Natural Sciences and Mathematics in Belgrade from 1949 to 1952. He was the rector of the University of Belgrade for two school years, 1952-1953 and 1953–1954. Mićović was popular with his many students from all over Yugoslavia.

He became a corresponding member of the Serbian Academy of Sciences and Arts on 30 Januar 1958, and a regular member on 20 December 1961. He was the secretary of the Department of Natural and Mathematical Sciences at SANU in 1963–1965, and the general secretary of SANU from 1965 to 1971.

Mićović published a large number of scientific papers in various fields of organic chemistry: the construction of alicyclic nuclei and synthetic glycerols of the structure of esters of dicarbonate acids, determination of the constitution of quinidine carbonic acids, systematic studies on reductions by means of lithium aluminum hydride, reactions of aliphatic alcohols with lead tetracitate, studies on the chemical composition of lichens of Serbia.

Mićović contributed to chemical nomenclature and terminology in the Serbian language. He wrote the university textbook "Stereochemistry", Scientific Book, Belgrade, 1948, 565 pages. He translated from the German books by Arnold Frederik Holleman: "Textbook of Organic Chemistry" and "Inorganic Chemistry". With a group of authors, he prepared a "Chemical textbook" for high schools, published in 1968.

In addition to Serbian, he spoke English, French, German, Russian and Italian. He was a member of the French Chemical Society (French: Société Chimique de France) from 1928 to 1941. He was the vice president of the Serbian Chemical Society and a member of the Croatian Chemical Society. He has won several awards and recognitions, including the Seventh of July Award of Serbia in 1965, the Order of Labor with a Red Flag (1964) and the Order of Merit for the People with a Golden Star (1979).

He died on 19 January 1981, in Belgrade and was buried in the Belgrade New Cemetery. His bust, together with the bust of George K. Stefanović, is in front of the entrance to the Great Chemical Amphitheater (WHA) of the Faculty of Chemistry.

He was married Magdalena "Lena" Sokić (1910–1993), the daughter of Milovan Sokić, an MP and cafe owner from Ivanjica. They had three children: Ruzica, Ivan and Milutin.

== Literature ==
- Dragomir Vitorović, Snežana Bojović, Živorad Čeković: “Vukić M. Mićović 1896-1981, life and work", Faculty of Chemistry, Belgrade, 1996, 142 pages.

== See also ==
- Zivojin Jocic
- Sima Lozanić
- Marko Leko
- Pavle Savić
- Persida Ilić
- Svetozar Lj. Jovanović
- Djordje K. Stefanović
- Milivoje Lozanić
- Dejan Popović Jekić
