= Dušan Kanazir =

Serbian biochemist and academician

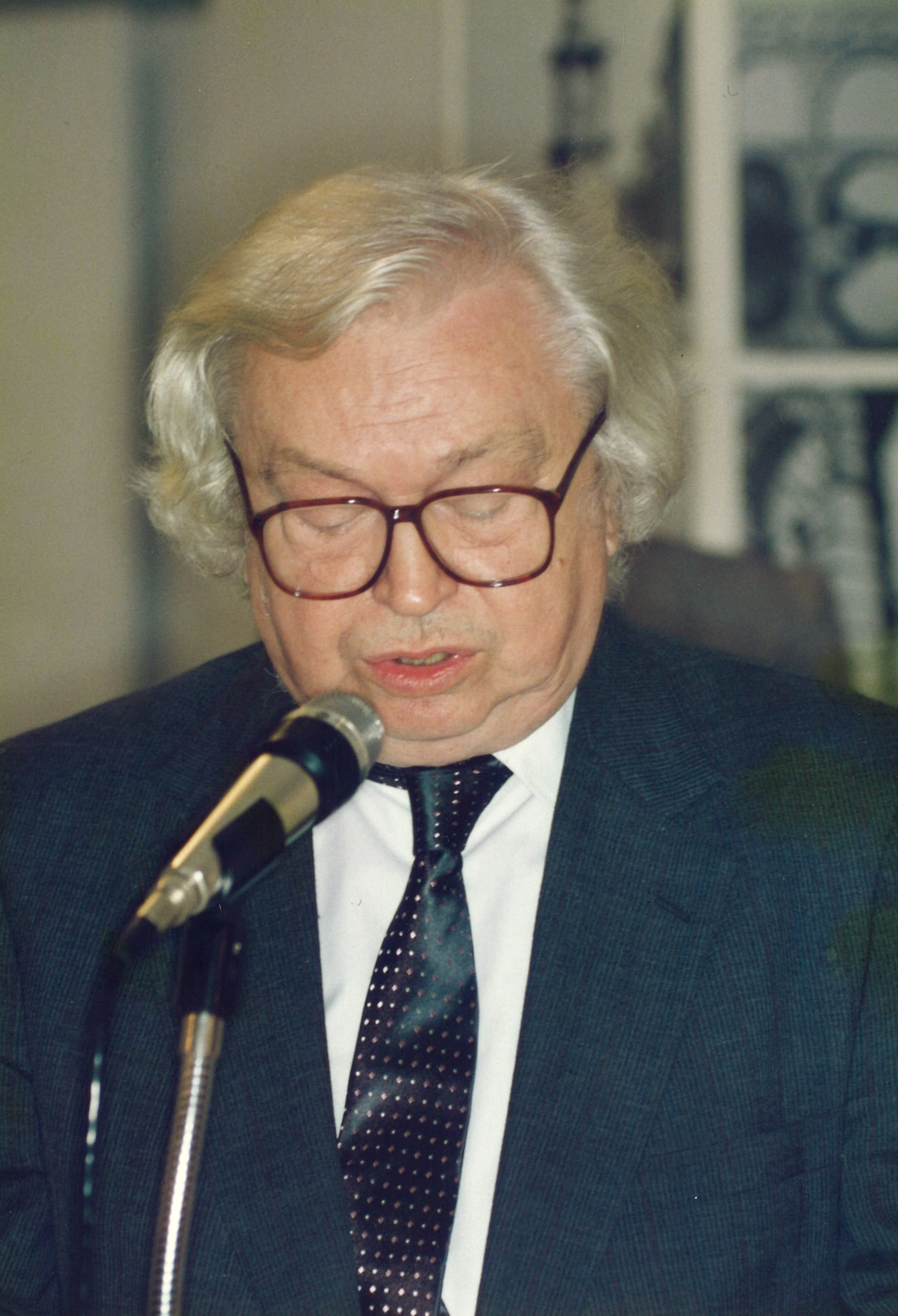
Dušan Kanazir

Dušan Kanazir (28 June 1921 – 19 September 2009) was a Serbian molecular biologist and academic. Kanazir was the president of Serbian Academy of Sciences and Arts.

== Biography ==
Kanazir was born as the son of Todor "Toša", a barber from Mošorin. His parents moved to Novi Sad, where his father got a job in the Banova Uprava and Women's Teacher School. He was educated in Novi Sad and graduated from mathematics 1940 at the II Male gymnasium. After the World war II, he moved to Belgrade. He studied medicine in Paris in (1945-49), and graduated in Belgrade in 1949. He received his doctorate in 1955. in Brussels in the field of physiological sciences. He completed postdoctoral studies in United States of America.

Dušan Kanazir was professor on call in United States of America, Belgium and Japan and a regular professor at University of Belgrade. As an eminent scientist, he was elected to many important forums and performed several responsible functions. He was a minister for the science and technology of the Republic of Serbia 1996-1998. He was elected vice president (1971-81) and president (1981-94) of SANU. Kanazir was a member of many of the most respected international associations and academies, such as Indian National Science Academy and Academy of Athens.

He has published over 200 scientific papers in the country and abroad. He received many awards and decorations for his work: Decoration for Work With Red Flag (1961, 1988). The 7 July Award (1961), Decoration of Merit for Nation With Gold Star (1965), AVNOJ Decoration for Achievements in Science of Former Yugoslavia (1970), Decoration of Brotherhood and Unity With Gold Wreath (1976), Commandeur of Legion of Honour, France (1984), Belgrade City Plaque (1984), Belgrade University 150th Anniversary Plaque (1988), Gratitude Plaque of the Institute for Nuclear Energy Application in Agriculture, Veterinary Medicine and Forestry (1988), Gratitude Plaque and Charter of the Faculty of Medicine, University of Niš (1996).

He died on September 19, 2009. in Belgrade.

Academic offices
Preceded by Pavle Savić	President of Serbian Academy of Sciences and Arts; 1981–1994	Succeeded by Aleksandar Despić
