= Jovan Žujović =

Serbian geologist and academic (1856–1936)

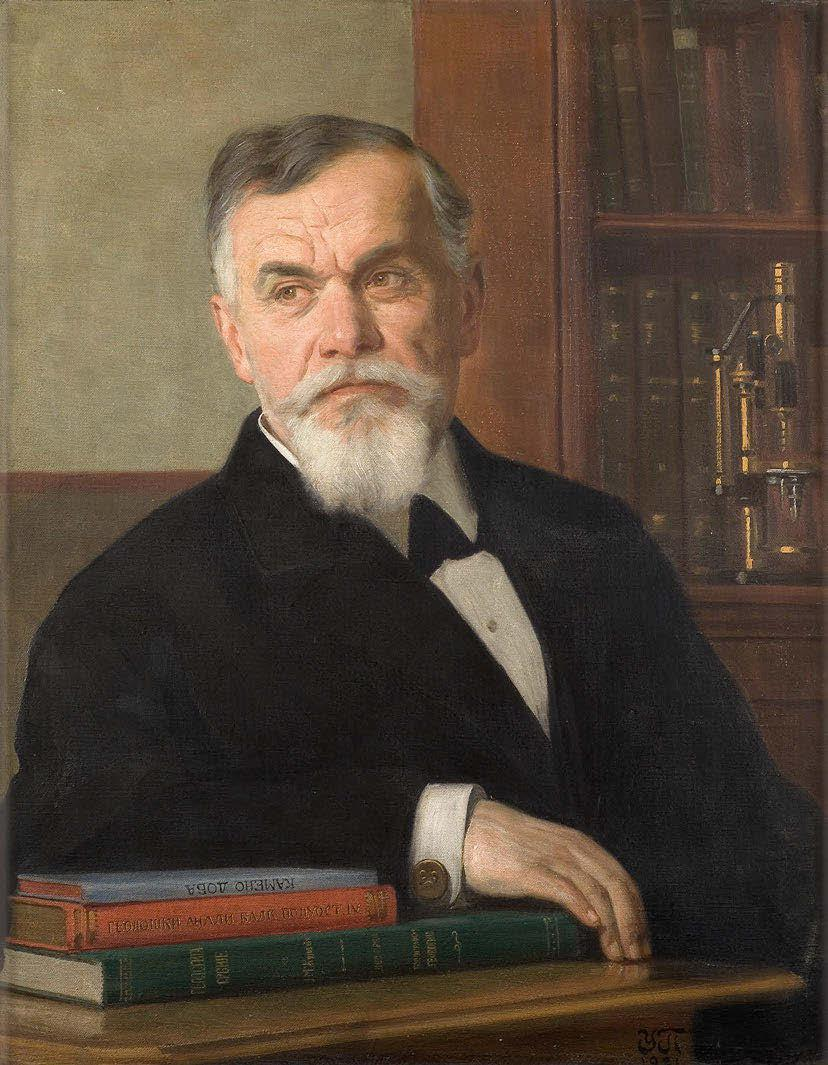
- Portrait painted by Uroš Predić
- Born: 18 October 1856; Brusnica, Gornji Milanovac, Principality of Serbia
- Died: 19 July 1936 (aged 79); Belgrade, Kingdom of Yugoslavia
- Resting place: Belgrade New Cemetery
- Education: University of Belgrade, University of Paris
- Scientific career
- Fields: Anthropology, Paleoanthropology, Geology
- Workplaces: Serbian Academy of Sciences and Arts

Signature
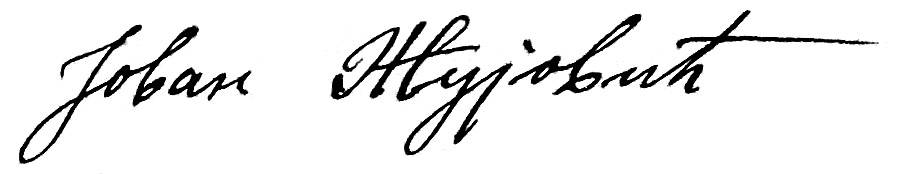

Jovan M. Žujović (Serbian Cyrillic: Јован M. Жујовић; 18 October 1856 – 19 July 1936) was a Serbian geologist, anthropologist, university professor, politician and academic. Žujović is known as a pioneer in geology, paleontology and craniometry in Serbia. He was a professor at Belgrade University, president of the Serbian Royal Academy and the first president of the Serbian Geological Society.

== Biography ==
He was born in Brusnica as the son of Mladen Žujović, head of the Rudnik district (1811-1894) and Jelena, née Danić. He completed elementary school in Nemenikuće and Belgrade, high school in Belgrade, and then the department of natural sciences of the Great School (1877).

After studying in Paris, he returned to Serbia and became the first Serb to scientifically research geology of Serbia and at the time neighbouring countries. Before Žujović, only two other scientists showed any interest in geology of Serbia, Johann Gottfried Herder and Ami Boué.

As the first educated geologist in Serbia, he was elected in 1880 as a substitute at the Department of Mineralogy with Geology at the Great School in Belgrade. This was the beginning of the modern geological school in Serbia. In addition to mineralogy and geology, he also started teaching paleontology. He brought the first polarizing microscope from Paris and introduced microscopic examinations of our soil. He became a full professor at the Great School in 1883. In a relatively short time (1880-1900), he produced a geological map of Serbia and wrote basic geology textbooks.

He founded the Geological Institute of the Great School (1889), launched the first geological journal in Serbia, "Geological Annals of the Balkan Peninsula" (1889), founded the Serbian Geological Society (1891). Everything that Žujović founded back then still exists today. He is one of the founders of the Museum of Serbian Land (today's Museum of Natural History, Belgrade). He introduced agrogeology at the Faculty of Agriculture, for the establishment of which he is also very responsible. He was also professor of applied geology at the Technical Faculty after the First World War. He published his scientific works in many foreign and domestic publications. He was one of the founding members and a member of the first Board of the Serbian Archaeological Society in 1883.

During the founding of the Serbian Royal Academy, King Milan I of Serbia appointed the first 16 members of the academy by decree on April 5, 1887. Among them was Jovan Žujović, as the youngest. According to the customs of the time, he became the secretary of the academy. After the death of Stojan Novaković, he became the president of the Serbian Royal Academy on April 2, 1915. He held this position for six years, until 1921. When the University of Belgrade was founded in 1905, he was chosen as a full professor, one of the eight who then chose the entire teaching staff of the university. Also, during the ceremonial opening of the university, he gave a speech on behalf of the Serbian Royal Academy.

On top of geology Žujović is known for his work in anthropology. In his book, Stone Age, published in 1893, relying mostly on French scientists, he reviewed the contemporary state of knowledge in paleoanthropology. Later, between 1927, and 1929, in the book Genesis of the Earth and Our Country, he wrote about the biological past of the Earth starting from the beginning of mankind. The work takes particular interest in the history of the Balkan peninsula.

Žujović's life's work "Geology of Serbia" was printed in 1893. With this work, Žujović covered everything that was necessary for the territory of Serbia to be considered a geologically explored area. Serbia then became one of the few European countries that were completely geologically explored in the 19th century.

Beside Serbian Royal Academy, Žujović was also a member of Yugoslav Academy of Sciences and Arts and Hungarian Academy of Sciences as well as geological society in Kiev, Ukraine.

In Serbian politics, he was a devoted democrat, Senator in 1901 and the member of the People's Radical Party of Nikola Pašić. After 1905, Žujović joined the Independent Radical Party of Ljubomir Stojanović. In the government of Independent Radicals, Žujović was a Minister of Foreign Affairs from 12 August to 15 December 1905. Also, Žujović held the post of Minister of Education and Religious Affairs on two occasions, from 16 May to 30 July 1905, and from 11 October 1909 to 12 September 1910.

Žujović had two brothers, Milenko Žujović, who authored books on jurisprudence, and Dr. Jevrem Žujović, whose mentor was Jean Alfred Fournier.

Jovan Žujović, geologist, researcher, politician, diplomat, erudite, scientist who marked the golden age of Serbian geology, died on July 19, 1936 in Belgrade.

== Selected works ==
- Geologische Uebersicht des Koenigreiches Serbien, Wien, 1886.
- Петрографска минералогија, 1887;
- Петрографија -{I-III}-, 1889, 1895;
- Основи за геологију Краљевине Србије, 1889;
- Sur les roches éruptives de la Serbie, Paris, 1893.
- Sur les terrains sédimentaires de la Serbie, Paris, 1893.
- Геологија Србије [Geology of Serbia] I-II, Belgrade 1893, 1900.
- Општа геологија [General Geology], Belgrade 1923.
- Les roches eruptives de la Serbie, Paris, 1924.
- Постање земље и наше домовине -{I-II}-, 1927, 1929;
- Снабдевање села водом. Извори и бунари, 1931.

== Legacy ==
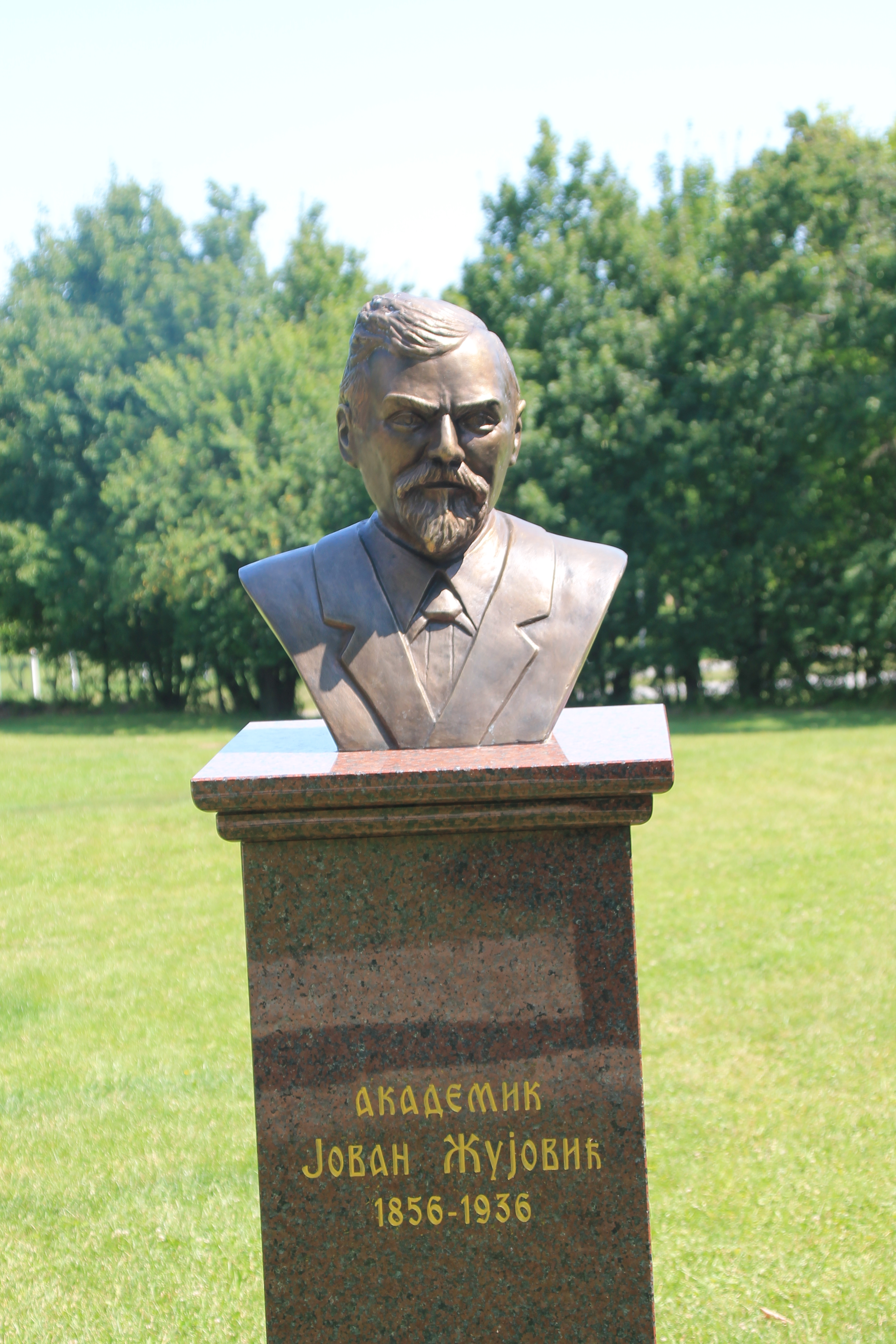
A bust of Žujović in Sopot, Belgrade

Žujović was decorated Legion of Honour, Order of St Sava, Order of the White Eagle and several French and Bulgarian decorations. He is included in The 100 most prominent Serbs.

== See also ==
- Sima Lozanić
- Svetolik Radovanović
- Sava Urošević
- Vladimir K. Petković
- Jovan Cvijić
- Petar Pavlović
- Mihailo Petrović Alas
- Ljubomir Jovanović
- Milan Nedeljković

Government offices
Preceded by Andra Nikolić	Minister of Education of Serbia; 1905	Succeeded by Ljubomir Stojanović
Preceded by Ljubomir Stojanović	Minister of Education of Serbia; 1909–1910	Succeeded by Jaša Prodanović
Preceded by Nikola Pašić	Minister of Foreign Affairs; 1905	Succeeded by Vasilije Antonić
Academic offices
Preceded by Vojislav Bakić	Rector of University of Belgrade; 1896–1897	Succeeded by Vojislav Bakić
Preceded by Stojan Novaković	President of Serbian Academy of Sciences and Arts; 1915–1921	Succeeded by Jovan Cvijić
