= Dejan Popović Jekić =

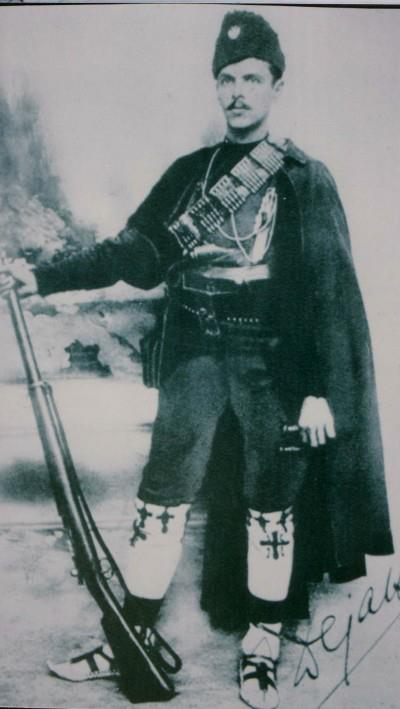
Dejan Popović Jekić

Dragomir "Dejan" Popović Jekić (Kruševac, Principality of Serbia, 1 September 1881 - Ohrid, Kingdom of Serbia, 15 March 1913), known as "Voivode Dejan" during the struggle for Old Serbia and Macedonia, was a chemist and Serbian Chetnik commander (vojvode). He was one of the earliest volunteers to join the Serbian Chetnik Organization and in the struggle for the liberation of Old Serbia and Macedonia from Ottoman oppression.

== Biography ==
Dragomir's father was a wealthy businessman. He was educated abroad at the universities in Germany, England, and Switzerland where he earned a degree in chemistry.

After graduation, Dragomir returned to Serbia where a teaching post at a university awaited him as well as a job as a director of a match factory. He stayed at these positions for a while. But at the outbreak of hostilities in Kosovo and Macedonia, like many men of his generation, the patriotic enthusiastic about the war effort took hold. He left his teaching post as assistant professor at the University of Belgrade and the executive post at a match factory to join the Chetniks. In the time of the Young Turk Revolution and the Bosnian crisis, he and other Chetniks retreated to Serbia.

Before the First Balkan War in 1912, he was in Switzerland being treated for tuberculosis. As soon as the war broke out, he came back to Serbia. There he collected a group of 100 volunteers and entered the Chetnik detachment of Vojin Popović, better known as Voivode Vuk. In the Battle of Kumanovo Dragomir gained a reputation for fearless-bravery under fire. He often took impossible missions with scant regard for his own life; his men felt tremendous confidence in his presence, inspired by his personal courage. In one of the battles he was heavily wounded, and his poor health began to worsen. He died in 1913 in the liberated town of Ohrid. His post as chemistry assistant professor at the university remained vacant during the period he served his country.

A street in Belgrade is named after him.

== See also ==
- List of Chetnik voivodes
- Sima Lozanić
- Miloje Lozanić
- Vukić Mićović
- Panta S. Tutundžić
- Jelenko Mihailović
- Pavle Savić
- Zivojin Jocic
