= Aleksandar Popović Sandor =

Serbian geologist (1847–1877)

Aleksandar Popović Sandor, born Aleksandar Popović, (10 December (Old Style) 1847, in Becej – 1877) was the father of Serbian geology. He first described the geology and natural wonders of Mount Fruška and what became in 1960 the Fruska Gora National Park. He did the first scientific investigation of the mineral springs at Vrnjačka Banja.

The town of Becej was in Hungary at the time, and when he was less than a year old his family lost everything in the turmoil of the abortive revolution of 1848. He father, who fought in the revolution, died in 1856, a broken man. His mother believed strongly in education and scrimped enough to keep him, and his two brothers, in school. Aleksandar Popović tutored other students and won scholarships to complete his basic education in Pest. His older brother Stephan gained preferment with the Serbian PrinceAlexander Karađorđević who was living in Pest at the time, and thus was able to support the family, allowing Aleksandar Popović to attend the University of Budapest where he studied geology under Professor József Szabó.

It was at this time that Aleksandar Popović began to use the second last name of "Sandor". Under Szabó, Aleksandar Popović undertook a number of survey field trips, notably to the Mount Fruška region. On one of these he discovered trachyte a volcanic rock easy to mine as a building stone. He reported his finding and was supported by Professor Szabó; however, by the time that a delegation from the Hungarian Geological Society went to look at the find, it had all been hauled away by local builders. It was only subsequently that Aleksandar Popović was vindicated when he discovered a second locale of trachyte in the Mount Fruška area. By the time Aleksandar Popović graduated, he was a member of the Hungarian Geological Society and the Geological Society of Vienna.

He accepted a position teaching at the high school in Novi Sad, although he was over-educated for the position, it allowed him to be closer to the mountains and gave him spare time for his researches. He taught natural science, mathematics, and Hungarian, as well as such other science classes as were temporarily lacking faculty. He was very interested in combating illiteracy, and published the first grammar-school textbooks in Serbian. He worked on translations of German and English works into Serbian, but was unfortunately taken by tuberculosis before reaching his thirtieth birthday.

When Professor Szabó was informed of Aleksandar Popović's death, he exclaimed, with tears in his eyes, Friend, I just cannot judge what a loss for Science is Sandor's death..

== See also ==
- Jovan Cvijić
- Jovan Žujović
- Svetolik Radovanović
- Vladimir K. Petković
- Jelenko Mihailović
- Milorad Dimitrijević
- Stevan Karamata
- Marko Leko
- Sava Urošević
- Milan Nedeljković (1857-1950)

== Sources ==
- Grubic, Aleksandar Priredio (2007). Aleksandar Sandor Popovic Geolog (in Serbian). Belgrade, Serbia: Geoloski Institut Srbije Izvrsno Vedje Autonomne Pokrajine Vojvodine, Pokrajinski Sekretarijat za Energetiku i Mineralne Sirovine (Geological Institute of Serbia Izvrsno Vedje Autonomous Province of Vojvodina, Provincial Secretariat for Energy and Mineral Resources). ISBN 978-86-909343-2-4.
