= Vladimir K. Petković =

Vladimir K. Petković (19 June 1873 — 21 March 1935) was a geologist, professor, dean of the Faculty of Philosophy and later rector of the University of Belgrade. He was succeeded as rector in 1934 by colleague Aleksandar Belić.

== Biography ==
Born in Boljevac, Morava Banovina, Kingdom of Serbia, Petković was the son of Kosta and Parlija (née Jovanović) Petković.

He first studied at a college in Zaječar, then the University of Belgrade, the University of Vienna and the University of Grenoble (France).

He authored several books, including his major work Geologija Istočne Srbije Book 1, published by Srpska kraljevska akademija (Serbian Royal Academy), 1935.

Petković was a corresponding member of the Academy of Natural Sciences from 18 February 1922; a full member of the Academy of Natural Sciences since 16 February 1929; and secretary of the Serbian Royal Academy of Natural Sciences from 7 March 1931 to 7 March 1933.

== See also ==
- Jovan Cvijić
- Jovan Žujović
- Svetolik Radovanović
- Stevan Karamata
- Marko Leko
- Aleksandar Popović Sandor
