= Panta Tutundžić =

Serbian chemist, professor and academic

Panta S. Tutundžić (Belgrade, Kingdom of Serbia, 15 September 1900 - Belgrade, Yugoslavia. 21 August 1964) was a distinguished Serbian chemist professor and academic of SANU.

== Biography ==
Panta Tutundžić attended elementary and realgymnasium in Belgrade. After two semesters of general grounding in science at the Department of Mechanical Engineering of the Technical University of Belgrade, he enrolled, in October 1920, at the Technische Hochschule in Berlin (now Technische Universität Berlin) with the main campus being located in the borough of Charlottenburg-Wilmersdorf. He graduated at this school at the beginning of 1925 and in the same year, after having defended his doctoral dissertation, he obtained the status of Doctor of Chemistry.

He was a professor of physical chemistry and electrochemistry, at the Faculty of Technology, University of Belgrade, a corresponding member of SANU since 1958, and a full member since 1961. In the period from 1955 to 1962, he was the president of the Serbian Chemical Society.

He published scientific papers in the field of theoretical and technical electrochemistry in the Gazette of the Chemical Society, Zeitschrift für Elektrohemie, Berichte der deutschen cheminschen Gesellschaft, Analytica Chimicakemica Acta, Glas, SAN and other scientific publications and journals.

He was the editor of the Gazette of the Serbian Chemical Society and a member of the editorial board of the Chemical Review, and in 1962 he was proclaimed the honorary life president of the Society. In 1963, he was elected an honorary member of the Société de Chimie Industrielle in Paris.

The most significant results, achieved within electroanalytic, belong to coulometric titrations. Professor Tutundžić gave original pioneering contributions to the development of iodometry, metalometry, permanganometry, bichromatometry, indirect coulometric titration of multicomponent systems. In his lifetime he published 97 scientific papers in journals in the country and abroad, 10 textbooks, seven studies, numerous discussions and articles, about 900 supplements for encyclopedias, held about 70 popular lectures and about 100 presentations at scientific conferences.

Based on the results achieved in the field of coulometry, Panta Tutundžić presented to the International Union for Pure and Applied Chemistry (IUPAC) in 1956 in Lisbon a proposal to introduce the pendant, a unit of electricity, as a universal standard in analytical chemistry. At the world exhibition in Brussels in 1958, in the International Pavilion of Science, the exhibit of Pante Tutundzic "Coulomb as a universal substance in analytical chemistry" was exhibited.

== Bibliography ==
- Ueber die Claisen-Darzens'sche Glycidsäureester-Synthese : Aufklärung des Reaktionsverlaufes und Anwendung zur Darstellung einiger neuer Aldehyde, Panta S Tutundzitsch, 1925;
- Spomenica posvečena preminulom akademiku, Panta S. Tutundžić, 1965;
- Recueil des conférences plénières, Congrès International de Chimie Industrielle, Belgrade, 1963;
- Tehnična analiza gasova, Panta S Tutundžić, 1947;
- Coulometrische Wismutometrie Quantitative Bestimmung von Phosphationen, Panta S. Tutundžić, 1966;
- Elektrohemija: Eksperimentalni osnovi i metode merenja, Panta S Tutundžić, 1940;
- Mikroelemente in einheimschen Naturpodukten und in Aschen und Schlacken, Panta S. Tutundžić;
- Hemija u službi čovečanstva, Panta Tutundžić, 1953.
- Електрохемија (Теоријска), 1959;
- Електрохемија (Техничка), 1960;
- Експериментални основи, 1961;
- Техничка анализа гасова, 1960;
- Физичка хемија I,1961;
