= Marko Leko =

Serbian scientist, chemist and professor

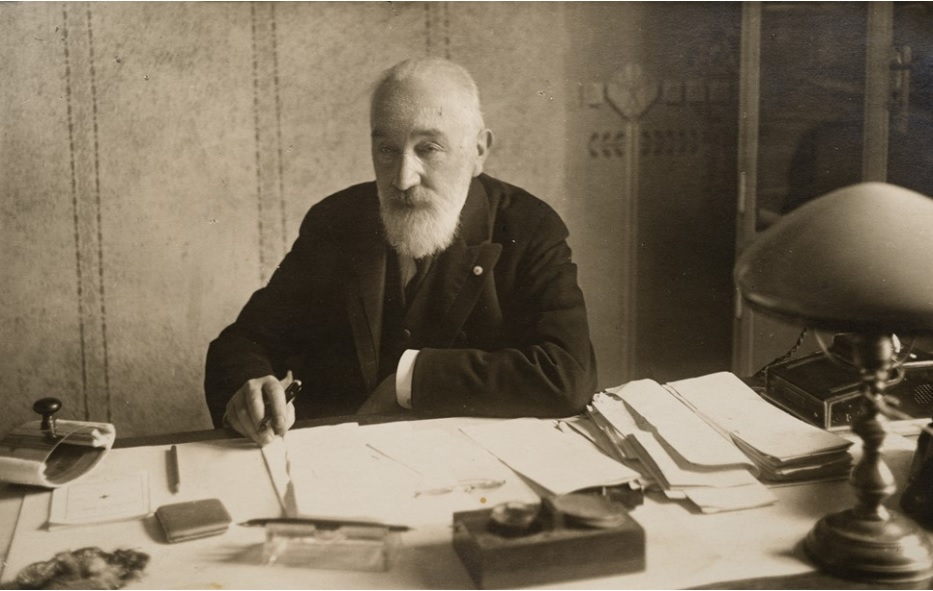
- Portrait of Marko Leko
- Born: 17 September 1853; Belgrade, Principality of Serbia
- Died: 4 November 1932 (aged 79); Belgrade, Kingdom of Yugoslavia
- Occupations: Chemist, University professor

Marko T. Leko (Serbian Cyrillic: Марко Т. Леко; 17 September 1853 – 4 November 1932) was a Serbian scientist, chemist, professor and president of the Serbian Red Cross. He played a major role in the professionalisation of chemistry in Serbia.

Leko was born in Belgrade, Serbia, on 17 September 1853, to a merchant family. He attended and graduated from Polytechnic School in Zurich and obtained his doctoral degree in 1875. For a short period, he was employed in Hoffman's laboratory.

== Career ==
He has 52 publications mostly in the areas of organic and analytical chemistry. Thanks to work he dedicated in writing his doctoral dissertation and the number of works that followed, he was able to solve one of the most sought problems of the time: does ammonium chloride and its closely related compounds belong to compounds of five valences nitrogen, NH_{4}Cl, or to compounds such as NH_{3}·HCl.

His work in analytical chemistry had two main interests: researching natural resources of Earth (mineral waters), and finding and improving new analytical methods. He was also interested in the chemical properties of natural spas and streams, and a stream located in Palanački Kiseljak bears his name Marko Leko. In 1899 he was promoting spas in Obrenovac region.

Leko was an active member of the Serbian Red Cross. At first, he was a treasurer (1915–1920), vice president (1921) and president (1924).

=== Teaching ===
At the time of the founding of Belgrade University in 1905, he was elected as an associate professor. He was deeply offended by this decision and on his own request retired early, on May 26 of 1905.

In 1895, Sima Lozanić, a fellow chemist, drafted a secondary textbook for chemistry, which Leko was asked to review. Leko put forward 36 objections to the draft. Leko and Lozanić argued the points for 2 years through correspondence to The Educational Gazette, at which point the Gazette refused to publish any more argument on the matter. One of the major issues was Lozanić's classification of N3 as an allotropic modification of Nitrogen.

His teaching posts included:

- 1880-1884: Professor of Chemistry in Belgrade's secondary schools
- 1881-1894: Professor of Chemistry at the Military Academy of Belgrade
- 1894-1905: Professor of Chemistry at the University of Belgrade (then Belgrade Higher School) (part-time from 1894, made full Professor 1899)
- 1884 became a member of Serbian Academic Society
- 1892 became a member of Serbian Royal Academy
- 1902/3 and 1903/4 was the Dean of then Great School
- 1904-1920 state chemist and superintendent of State's Chemical Laboratory in Belgrade

=== Serbian Chemical Society ===
In 1897, Leko was the Manager of the Government Chemical Laboratory in Belgrade. The 3rd International Congress on Applied Chemistry was scheduled to be held in 1898, so the Main Committee for that Congress wrote to Leko suggesting a Serbian committee be organised to stimulate interest in the Serbian academic community.

The first meeting of the Serbian Chemical Society was held on 15 November 1897 in Belgrade. The society did not create the office of President until 1904, at which time Leko was appointed as President of the Serbian Chemical Society. He was replaced in approximately 1907 at his own request, given he would be absent from the country while performing the role of President and Chief Manager of the Balkan Exhibition in London.

During the period he was president, Dr Leko wrote 68 papers for the Society. Leko also authored a report on the Society's activities: 'A Contribution to the Development of Applied Chemistry in the Kingdom of Serbia' (1906).

== Personal life ==
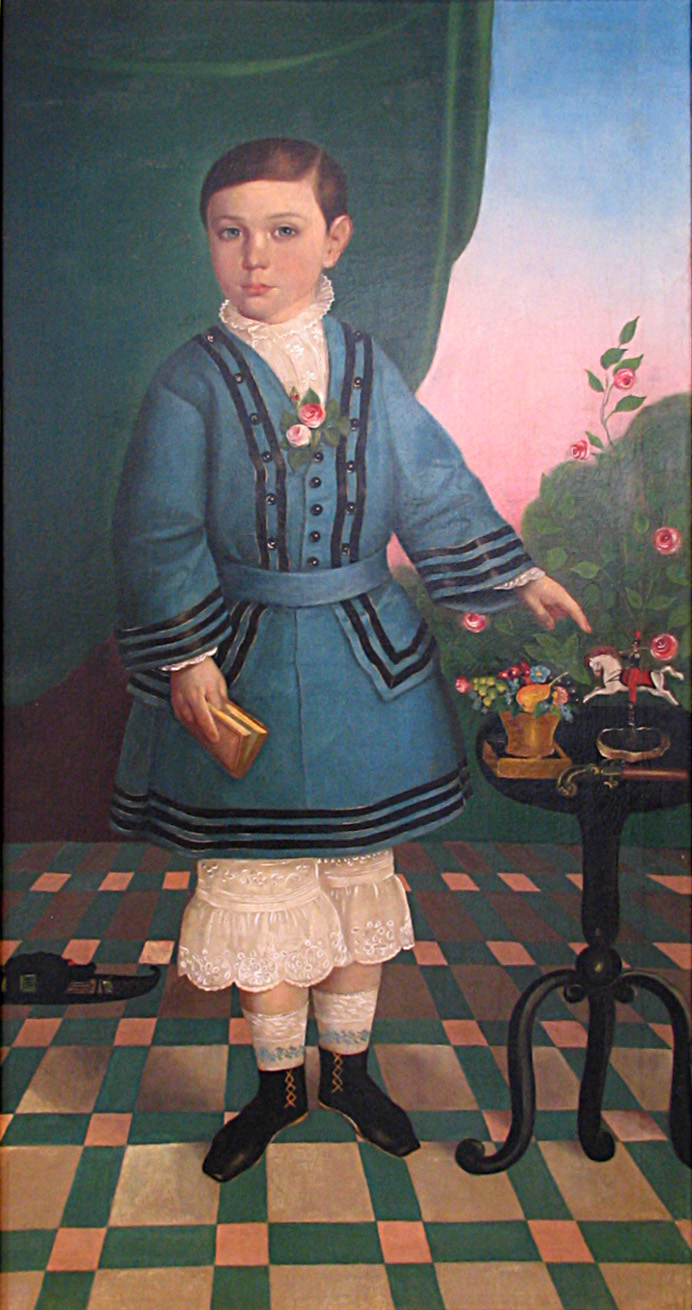
Leko as a boy, portrait by Uroš Knežević, 1856

Leko had a large family. With his wife Danica (née Antula) he had eleven children. As parents they dedicated much of their time to their children education: five of his sons were noted jurist (Dušan M. Leko), chemist (Aleksandar M. Leko), architect (Dimitrije M. Leko), general (Jovan Leko), banker and financier (Dragoljub M. Leko). His brother Dimitrije T. Leko was a renowned architect.

== Death ==
He died on 4 November 1932 in Belgrade. Many important dignitaries of the time paid tribute to the scientist: the King Alexander I, members of the Royal government, members of the central committee of Red Cross and members of academia and Belgrade University.

One of Belgrade's street, close to National Theater, bears his name. Before being renamed after him, the street bore the name Golden angel after the little family store owned by his father.

== See also ==
- Sima Lozanić
- Jovan Cvijić
- Jovan Žujović
- Svetolik Radovanović
- Vladimir K. Petković
- Jelenko Mihailović
- Milorad Dimitrijević-Kvaks
- Stevan Karamata
- Aleksandar Popović Sandor
- Sava Urošević
- Milan Nedeljković (1857-1950)
- Dejan Popović Jekić
