= Stevan Karamata =

Serbian geologist (1926–2015)

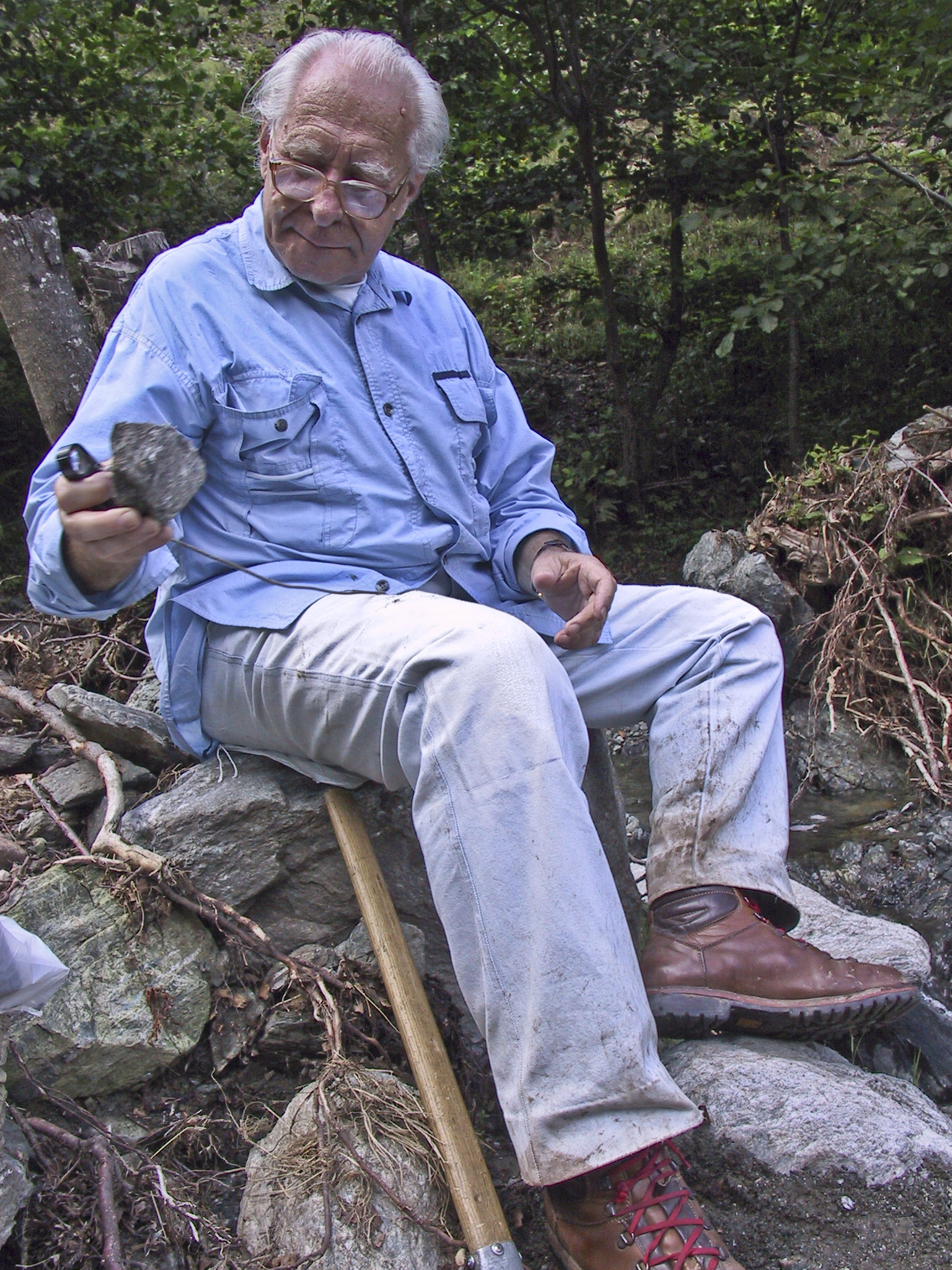
Photo of Professor Stevan Karamata

Stevan Karamata (26 September 1926 – 25 July 2015) was a Serbian geologist, a member of the Serbian Academy of Sciences and Arts, and a professor at the Faculty of Mining and Geology at the University of Belgrade.

== Biography ==
Karamata was born in 1926 in Belgrade, Serbia to Ozren and Zora Karamata. He studied geology in Zagreb and Belgrade and graduated in 1950 from the Geological Department of the Faculty of Mining and Geology in Belgrade. From 1956 to 1967, he taught at the Faculty of Mining and Geology and he retired in 1990. His teaching and scientific work pertained to petrology, mineralogy, and geochemistry of ore deposits. He guest lectured at Jahseh and several foreign faculties (Leoben, Freiburg, Zürich). He has engaged in research work in former Yugoslavia, Pakistan, Turkey, and other areas.

Karamata became a corresponding member of SANU in 1970 and gained full membership in 1985. He was also a member of other academies of science, such as the Croatian Academy of Sciences and Arts, Austrian Academy of Sciences, Academy of Natural Sciences of the Russian Federation, and Academy of Sciences and Arts of the Republic of Srpska. He also received an honorary doctorate from the University of Cluj. Additionally, Karamata was a member of the Serbian Geological Society, Swiss Mineralogical and Petrological Society, Society of Physical and Natural Science in Geneva, and Bulgarian Geological Society.

== Scientific work ==
Stevan Karamata's scientific work was related to the petrology and geochemistry of ophiolites and ophiolite zones of the Balkans. He is known for his geodynamic theory of the formation of the ophiolite zones of the Dinarides and the Vardar zone. He authored and co-authored many scholarly and scientific publications, including:

- "The geological development of the Balkan Peninsula related to the approach, collision and compression of Gondwanan and Eurasian units, Geological Society, London, Special Publications, 2006;
- "Overview of ophiolites and related units in the Late Palaeozoic–Early Cenozoic magmatic and tectonic development of Tethys in the northern part of the Balkan region," S. Karamata, K. Šarić, 2009;
- "The role of subduction-accretion processes in the tectonic evolution of the Mesozoic Tethys in Serbia", A. Robertson, S. Karamata, 1994;
- "Terranes of Serbia and neighbouring areas," S. Karamata, B. Krstić, 1996;
- "Age of amphibolites associated with Alpine peridotites in the Dinaride ophiolite zone," M. A. Lanphere, R. G. Coleman, S. Karamata, J. Pamić, 1975
- Triassic evolution of the tectonostratigraphic units of the Circum-Pannonian Region", S. Kovacs, M. Sudar, E Gradinaru, H.J. Gawlick, S. Karamata, J Haas, ..., 2011;
- "Olistostrome/mélanges – an overview of the problems and preliminary comparison of such formations in Yugoslavia and NE Hungary," M.N. Dimitrijević, M.D. Dimitrijević, S. Karamata, M. Sudar, N. Gerzina, ..., 2003;
- "Magmatism and metallogeny of the Ridanj-Krepoljin belt (eastern Serbia) and their correlation with northern and eastern analogues", S. Karamata, V. Knežević, Z. Pecskay, M. Djordjević, 1997;
- "Terranes between the Moesian plate and the Adriatic sea," S. Karamata, B. Krstić, M.D. Dimitrijević, M.N. Dimitrijević, V. Knežević, ..., 1997;
- "Correlation of the Carboniferous, Permian and Triassic sequences of the Jadar block, Sana-Una and Bükkium terranes", L. Protić, I. Filipović, P. Pelikán, D. Jovanović, S. Kovács, M. Sudar, K Hips, ..., 2000
- "The western belt of the Vardar Zone – the remnant of a marginal sea," S. Karamata, J. Olujić, L. Protić, D. Milovanović, L. Vujnović, A. Popević, ..., 2000
- "Zonality in contact metamorphic rocks around the ultramafic mass of Brezovica (Serbia, Yugoslavia)", S. Karamata, 1968;
- "Mantle peridotites from the Dinaridic ophiolite belt and the Vardar zone western belt, central Balkan: A petrological comparison", B.A. Bazylev, A. Popević, S. Karamata, N.N. Kononkova, S.G. Simakin, J. Olujić, 2009;
- "The geodynamical framework of the Balkan Peninsula: its origin due to the approach, collision and compression of Gondwanan and Eurasian units", S. Karamata, 2006;
- Petrology of the crossite schist from Fruška Gora Mts (Yugoslavia), a relic of a subducted slab of the Tethyan oceanic crust", 1995;
- "The age of metamorphic rocks of Brezovica and its importance for the explanation of ophiolite emplacement", S. Karamata, 1978;
- "Upper Triassic (Carnian-Norian) radiolarians in cherts of Sjenica (SW Serbia) and the time span of the oceanic realm ancestor of the Dinaridic Ophiolite Belt, 1999;
- "Two genetic groups of Tertiary granitic rocks of central and western Serbia," 1992
- "Triassic environments in the Circum-Pannonian region related to the initial Neotethyan rifting stage", 2010
- "A correlation of ophiolitic belts and oceanic realms of the Vardar Zone and the Dinarides".

== Awards ==
- Order of Labor with a golden wreath, 1981
- Order of Njegoš of the second order, 1997

== See also ==
- Karamata Family House
- The building of the Karamata printing house in Zemun
- Jovan Cvijić
- Jovan Žujović
- Svetolik Radovanović
- Vladimir K. Petković
- Jelenko Mihailović
- Milorad Dimitrijević-Kvaks
- Sava Urošević
- Marko Leko
- Aleksandar Popović Sandor
- Milan Nedeljković (1857-1950)

== Sources ==
- "Page about academician Stevan Karamati on the SANU website". Archived from the original on March 5, 2016. Accessed November 4, 2012.
- "Biography of Stevan Karamate" (PDF). Retrieved November 4, 2012
- "Robertson & Karamata – The role of subduction-accretion processes in the tectonic evolution of the Mesozoic Tethys in Serbia". Retrieved November 4, 2012.
