= Natural History Museum in Belgrade =

- Природњачки музеј у Београду; Prirodnjački muzej u Beogradu
- Official logo

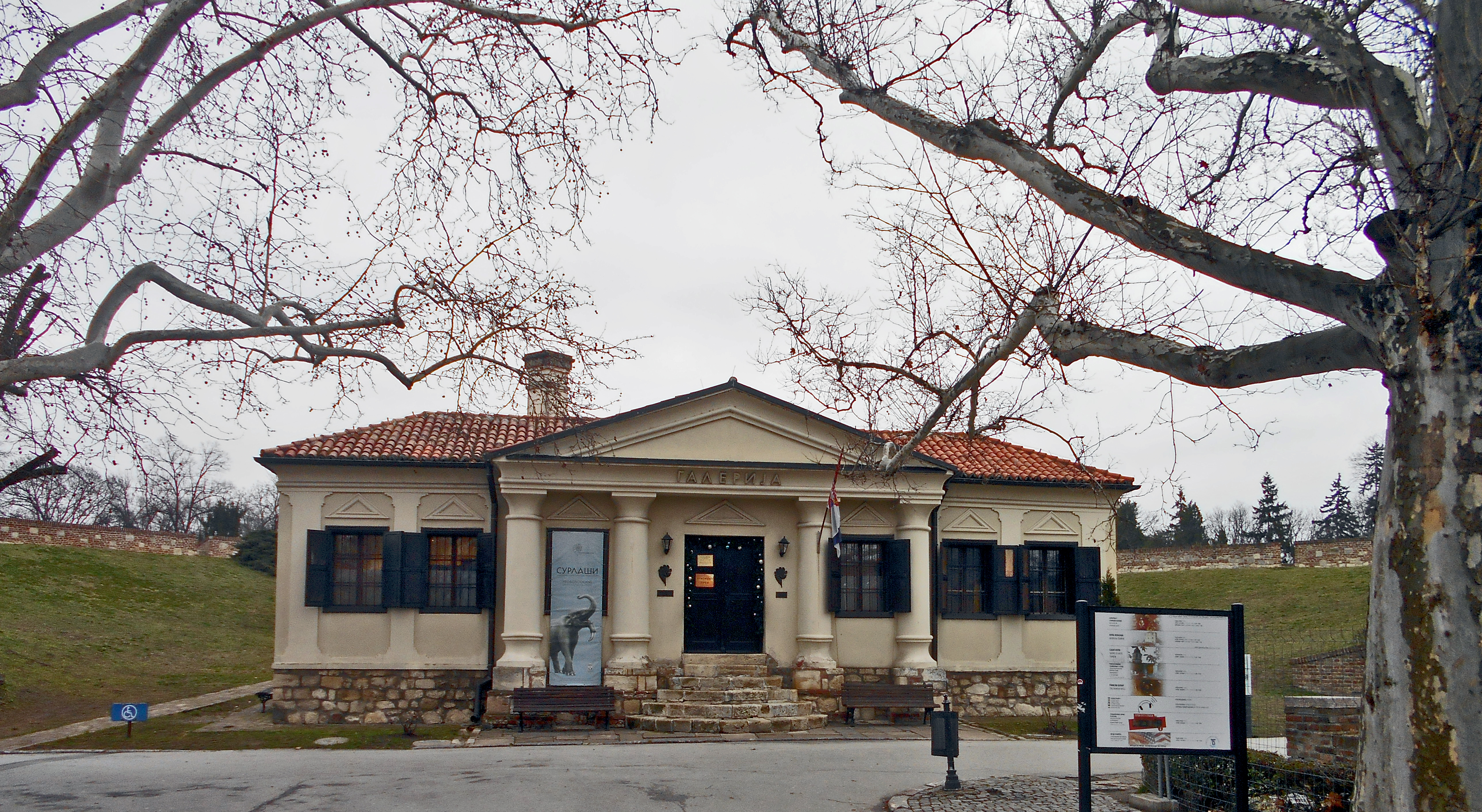
- Gallery of the Natural History Museum at Kalemegdan
- Established: 19 December 1895; 130 years ago
- Location: Belgrade, Serbia
- Coordinates: 44.812283°N 20.461346°E
- Type: Natural history museum
- Collection size: 2,000,000
- Director: Slavko Spasić
- Website: nhmbeo.rs

The Natural History Museum in Belgrade (Serbian: Природњачки музеј у Београду / Prirodnjački muzej u Beogradu) is a museum located in Belgrade, Serbia. It is one of the oldest specialized national institutions in Serbia, and is the only museum of this type in Serbia.

By the richness and diversity of the exhibited species, as well as the results achieved in the domain of museology and science, this museum is one of the most important in the South-Eastern Europe. It was officially founded in 1895, registered as The Natural History Museum of Serbian Land at that time (Јестаственички музеј српске земље).

== History ==
Prior to the foundation of the Museum, in the first half of the 19th century, in the former Principality of Serbia, there was a large number of natural history collections, predominantly kept in the Natural History Cabinet of the Great Lyceum (Great School). The museum was initially located at an Endowment house of Stevče Mihajlovic on the Vracar (central municipality of Belgrade).

Josif Pančić is considered to be the founder of the Natural History Museum who, accompanied by the group of his associates and students, systematically collected, studied and extracted specimens from nature to be exhibited. He was the first president of the Serbian Royal Academy and the Great Lyceum professor. Thoroughly investigating the flora of Serbia during his era, he has discovered and described about 50, even nowadays scientifically valid, plant species (Picea omorica, Ramonda serbica, Eryngium serbicum, Centaurea derventana and others).

The first Museum exhibition was held in 1904 in Belgrade, in the presence of King Peter I and his officials, with the first guest presentation of the naturalist items abroad being held in the same year, an important contribution to the World Exhibition in Paris. The first manager of the Museum was the academician Petar Pavlović, a geologist and a lecturer at the Great Lyceum.

Construction of the new building for the Natural History Museum and Aquarium at Ušće is set to begin in 2026.

== Museum today ==
Natural history collections, from as early as 1939 up until the present day, have been preserved in a temporary space in the former building of the very First Female Gymnasium in Njegoševa Street, 51, Belgrade. Museum collections house documents regarding the natural history not only of Serbia, but also the neighboring Balkan regions, showing their development, from ancient times until today. Examples of plant species and animals are kept in the museum, flora and fauna which no longer can be found on the terrains of Serbia because, due to human influence, they have disappeared or migrated to other areas. The collections contain several thousand holotypes and unique specimens of minerals, rocks, plant and zoological species.

Back in 1972 the Natural History Museum in Belgrade was associated with the Museum of Forestry and Hunting, with its collections of hunting trophies and hunting weapons.

The museum is divided into four sectors: geology (dealing with mineralogy, petrology and paleontology), biology (dealing with botany, zoology and mycology), education and public relations, and joint service.

The museum won the award "Mihailo Valtrović" for the Museum of the Year 2012, granted by the Museum Society of Serbia.

On 15 February 2016, by the decree of the President of the Republic of Serbia, the Museum has been awarded the Candlemas medal (Sretenjski orden) of the second degree for special merits in relation to the science, culture and museology, on occasion of 120 years of its foundation. The Museum celebrated a jubilee within the solemn conference held in the Serbian Academy of Science and Arts (SANU – Srpska akademija nauka i umetnosti) in December 2015.

The Natural History Museum in Belgrade has been declared a cultural institution of national importance. From its foundation up to the present day the Museum doesn't have its own building nor appropriate showroom.

Researchers from the Museum—a team led by Dr. Zoran Marković—discovered the first known dinosaur body fossils from Serbia, including a small sauropod ulna and sixteen small theropod teeth, all unearthed at the Osmakovo site.

== Collections ==
The temporary space is occupied by 120 collections, which represent the natural and cultural heritage of these areas. These collections comprise about two million specimens from Serbia, the Balkan Peninsula, but also other parts of the world. Considering the number of items, a few following collections stand out: mineralogical, petrological and collections of fossil and recent molluscs, insects, birds, mammals and General Herbarium of the Balkan Peninsula. All the above-mentioned collections have enormous scientific and museological value. Collections are organized in two divisions, as follows:

=== Biology department ===
- Mycological collection
- Collection of lichen
- General Balkan Peninsula herbarium
- Collection of Belgrade nature monuments
- Collection of fruits
- Collection of weeds
- Collection of arthropods (without insects)
- Entomological collection
- Collection of mollusks
- Study collection and collection of amphibian species
- Study collection and collection of reptilians species
- Osteological collection of recent amphibian and reptilians
- Osteological collection of Milutin Radovanović, Ph.D.
- Collection of fish – Ichthyological collection
- Collection of birds
- Collection of mammals

=== Geology department ===
- Mineralogical collection
- Petrological collection
- Paleobotanical collection
- Collection of paleozoic fossil invertebrates
- Collection of mesozoic fossil invertebrates
- Collection of cenozoic fossil invertebrates
- Collection of an academician Petar Stevanović
- Paleontological collection of Nadežda Krstić
- Collection of fossil lower vertebrates
- Collection of tertiary small mammals
- Collection of quaternary small mammals
- Collection of tertiary large mammals
- Collection of quaternary large mammals

== Library ==
The library is part of the Natural History Museum in Belgrade and was officially established in 1903. The first great contribution to the Library consisted of a comprehensive professional library of the prof. Dr. Lazar Dokić, which is considered to be the basic and initial Library fund. The library today encompasses 25,245 titles, 1,236 domestic and foreign periodicals (79,823 numbers), 1,032 geographical and geological maps and 226 manuscripts. The library fund consists of a large number of antique and rare books, first editions, as well as sets of numerous respectable scientific magazines worldwide. Albeit being a rather specialized library, it is available to the public.

== Museum publishing activity ==
Publishing activity of the Museum commenced in 1903. Initially, the former Natural History Museum of the Serbian Land has published concise articles on fauna, flora and gea. The first papers were printed in periodicals such as The Hunter, The Teacher and The Educational Gazette. The Natural History Museum has its own journal, which first issue have been published in 1948, as the Gazette of the Natural History Museum of Serbian Land (beginning with 1958 as The Gazette of the Natural History Museum, and from 2008 on as the Bulletin of the Natural History Museum in Belgrade). Since 2007, the museum initiated edition: Yearbook of Natural History Museum. The yearbook was designed to disclose data on all activities and events in a calendar year: news, information on curator's results, collections arrangements, training and workshops, published papers, participation at conferences, media appearances, the work of the library, educational work and the like activities.

== Gallery at Kalemegdan ==
The Museum has no permanent exhibition and various exhibition activities, educational workshops, promotions and conferences are all held in the Gallery at Kalemegdan. Educational service of the Museum collaborates with numerous schools and nurseries of Serbia, adjusting its activities to children of all ages.

== Gallery ==
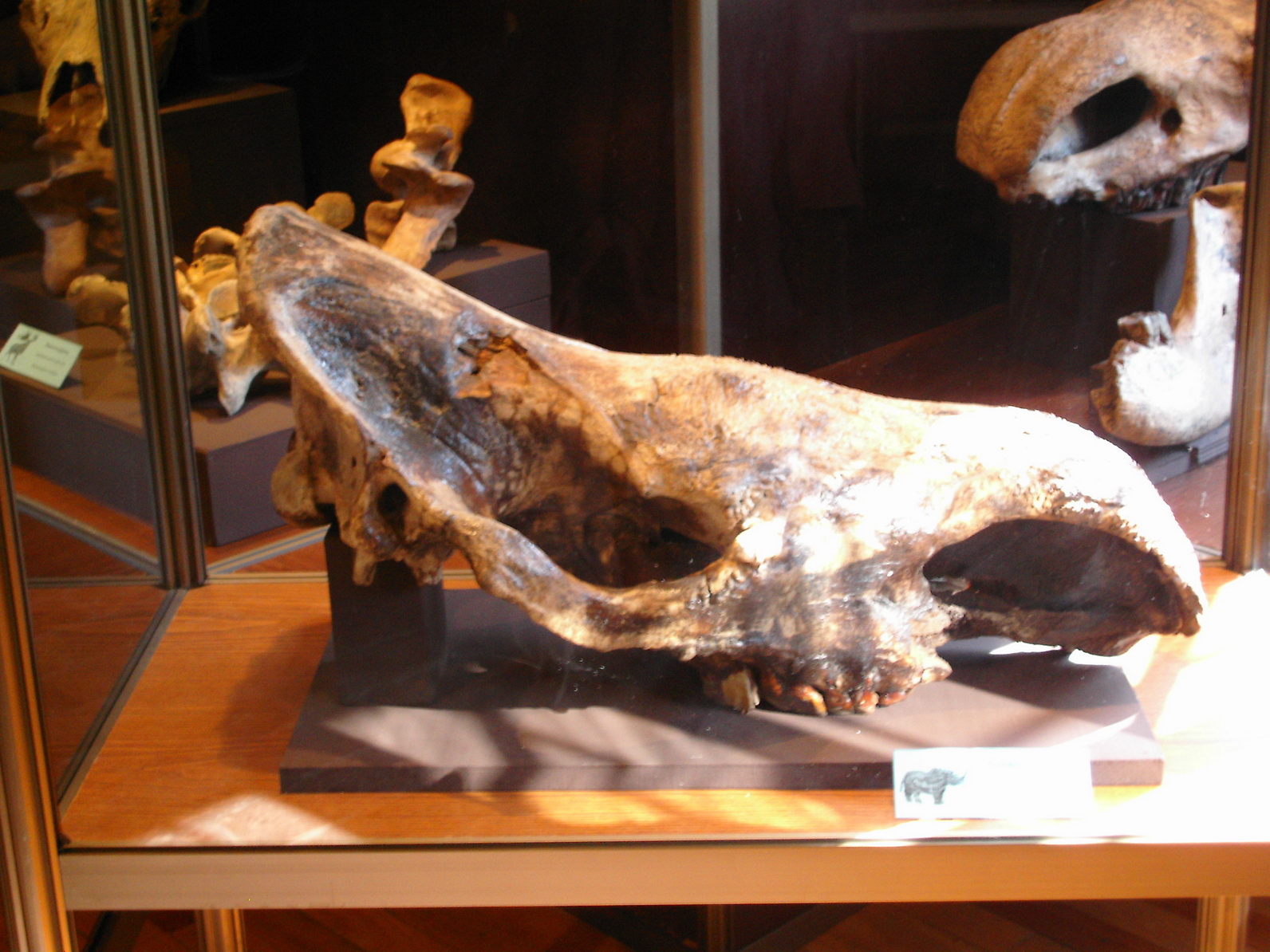
Skull of a woolly rhinoceros (Coelodonta antiquitatis) from Serbia

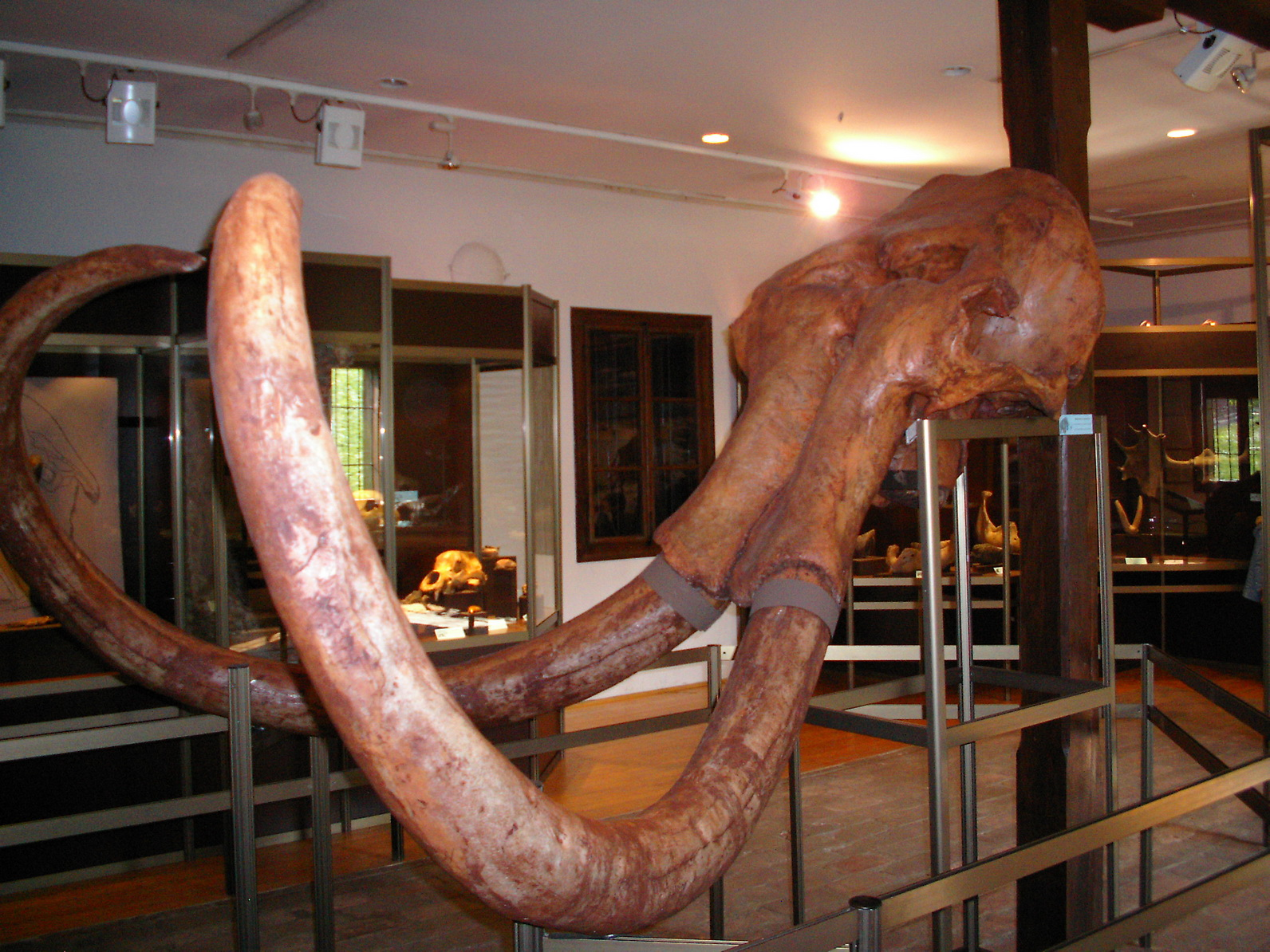
Skull with tusks of a steppe mammoth (Mammuthus trogontherii)

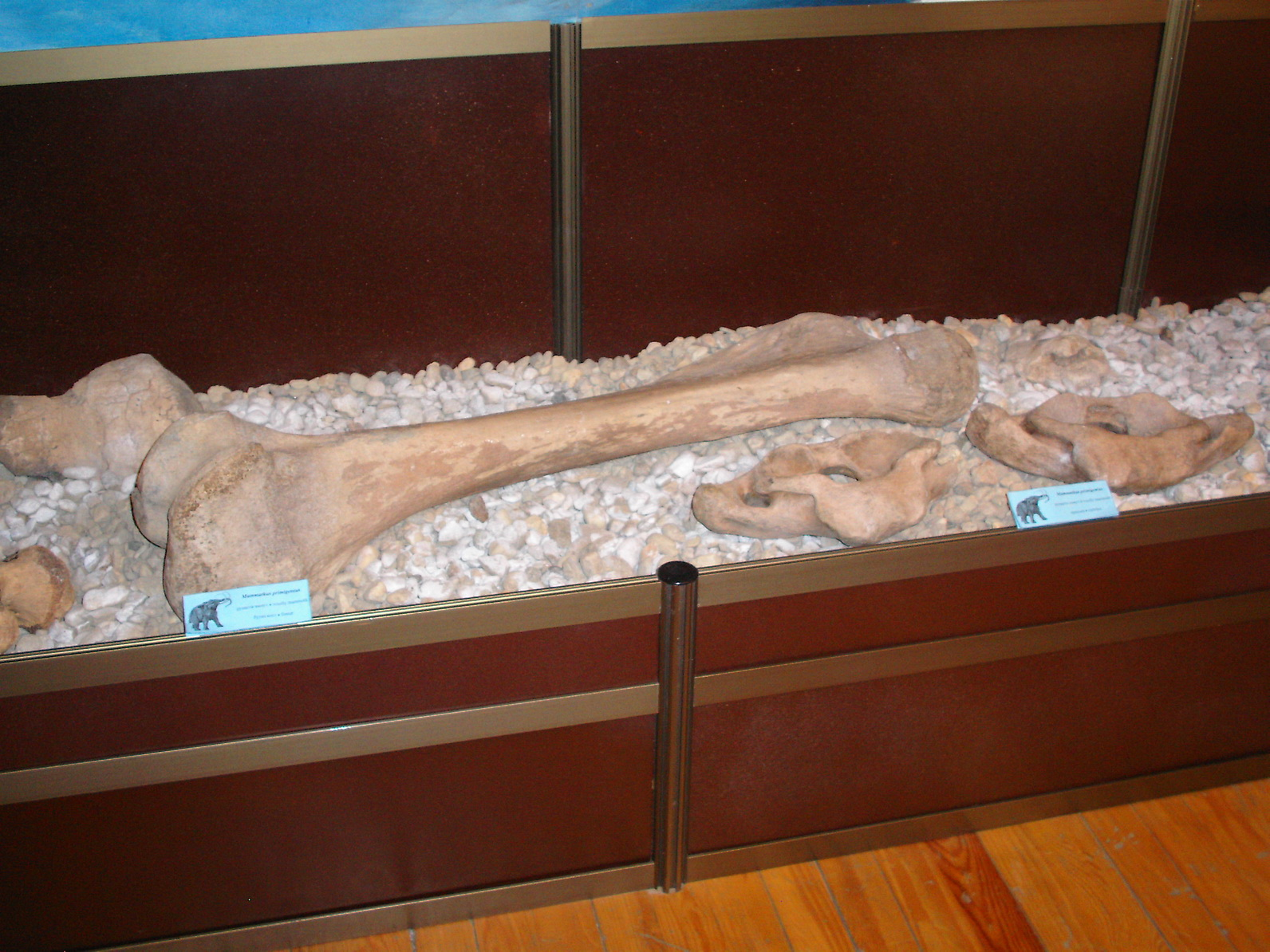
Femur and vertebrae of a steppe mammoth

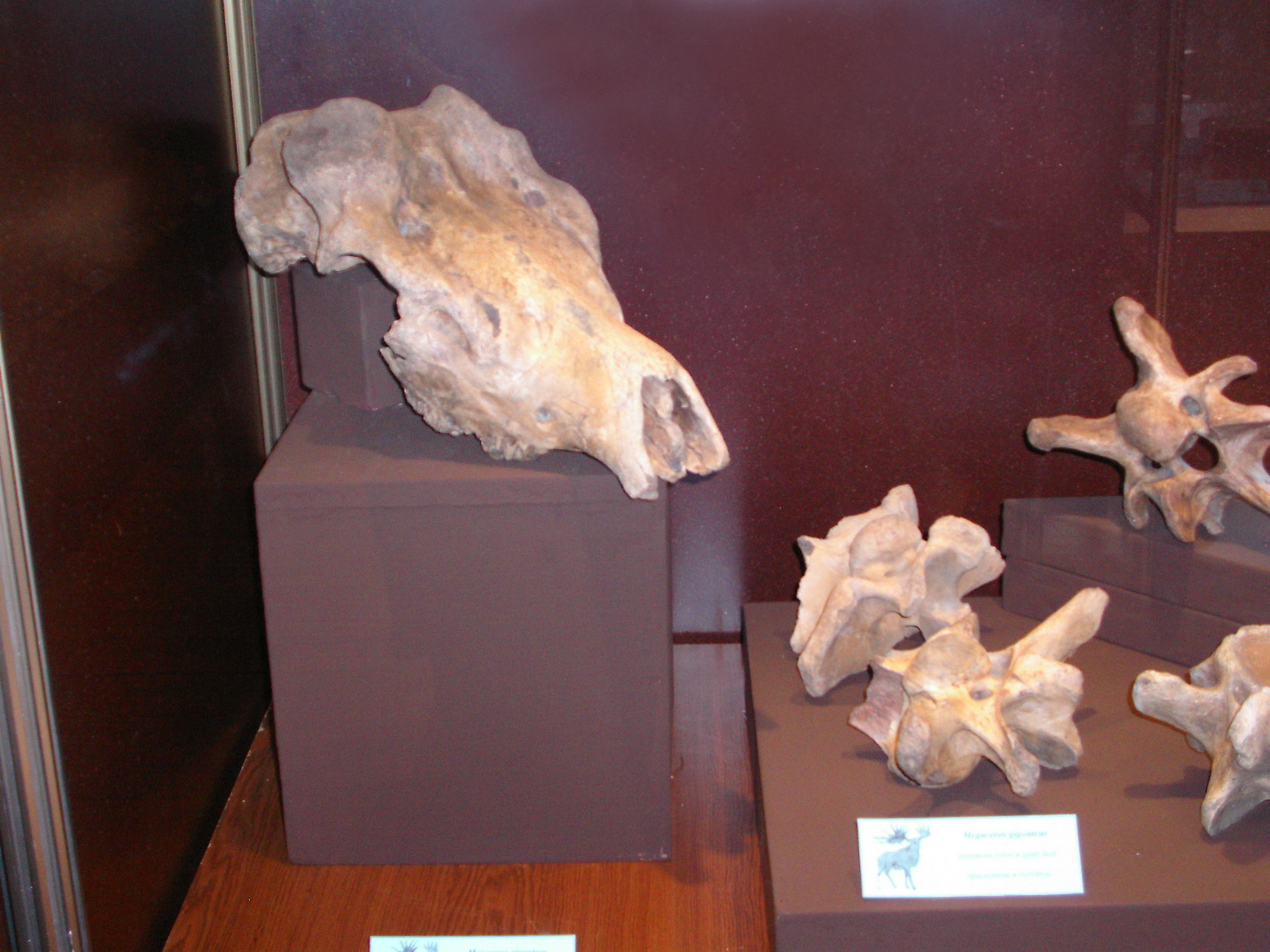
Irish elk (Megaloceros giganteus) skull and vertebrae

== See also ==
- List of museums in Serbia
