= Pavle Savić =

Serbian physicist and chemist (1909-1994)

- Павле Савић
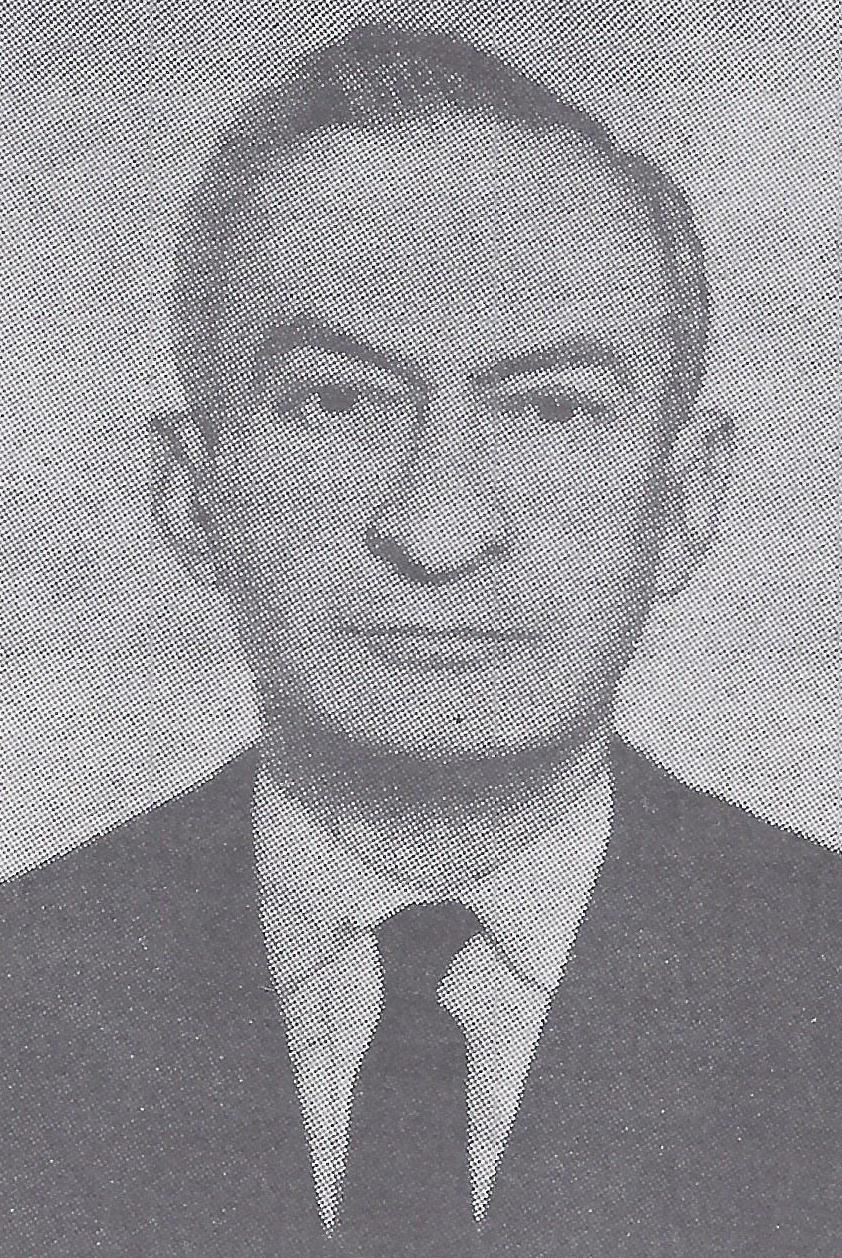
- Born: 10 January 1909; Thessaloniki, Ottoman Empire
- Died: 30 May 1994 (aged 85); Belgrade, Serbia, FR Yugoslavia
- Scientific career
- Fields: Physics, Chemistry

Pavle Savić (Serbian Cyrillic: Павле Савић; 10 January 1909 – 30 May 1994) was a Serbian physicist and chemist. In his early years, he worked in Serbia as well as France, and became one of the pioneers in the research of nuclear fission. He was also a sympathiser of Yugoslav communists in the interwar period, and then rose to prominence during World War II in Yugoslavia. He made important contributions to the Partisan resistance to the Axis occupation, became a delegate to AVNOJ, and was also sent on high level missions to the Soviet Union. After the war, he founded the Vinča Nuclear Institute and was a tenured professor at the University of Belgrade as well as a member of numerous learned societies, and a president of the Serbian Academy of Sciences and Arts.

== Biography ==
Pavle Savić was born to Ana and Petar Savić, as the eldest of five children. His father was a veterinarian, and his mother was the sister of Kosta Stojanović, a one-time professor at the Belgrade Higher School and a minister in the Government of the Kingdom of Serbia. His birthplace happened to be Thessaloniki, Greece, where his father was posted in a free customs zone at the time. The family soon moved to Svilajnac where they spent the time of the Balkan Wars and World War I. Afterwards, they moved to Belgrade where he completed middle school in 1923, and then to Požarevac, where he would graduate high school in 1927, after having shown a keen interest in the natural sciences.

Savić would go on to graduate with a degree in physical chemistry from the University of Belgrade in 1932. After completing the mandatory military service of the Kingdom of Yugoslavia, he became a teaching assistant at the university, ultimately working with professor Dragoljub Jovanović who had previously collaborated with Marie Curie at the Radium Institute, Paris. By 1934, he had published his first scientific paper in the journal of the French Academy of Sciences.

In 1935, he received a six-month scholarship from the French government to study in France, where he moved with his freshly married bride Branka (née Božinović). With professor Jovanović's references, he was hired at the Radium Institute in Paris, and he would ultimately spend five years in France. He worked with Irène Joliot-Curie and Frédéric Joliot-Curie on interactions of neutrons in the chemical physics of heavy elements, and they published a number of papers in 1938 and 1939. This turned out to be an important step in the discovery of nuclear fission. Together with Irène Joliot-Curie, Savić was nominated for the Nobel Prize in Physics, but the prize hadn't been awarded during World War II. The same issues were researched by a number of other scientists, including Enrico Fermi, Lise Meitner, Otto Hahn, Fritz Strassmann and others, but in 1944 the Nobel Prize was awarded for the discovery of fission only to Hahn.

In the late 1930s, Savić also took part in social and political activities of the Yugoslav students in France, and in 1938 was elected as the president of their association as a candidate though not yet a member of the Communist Party of Yugoslavia. He worked with Boris Kidrič and others to aid the Yugoslav volunteers in the Spanish Civil War, and in 1939 became a member of the CPY. Though he was one of the few teachers of the University of Belgrade to do so at the time, his family actually had a history of socialist and later communist activism. As the international affairs at the time became more turbulent, he was expelled from France by the end of the same year, and returned to teach physical chemistry at the then pharmaceutical department of the University of Belgrade Faculty of Medicine.

At the start of World War II and the occupation of Yugoslavia, Savić immediately became part of the underground resistance to the German occupation. Soon, in July 1941, after having assisted Partisan sabotages, he and his wife left Belgrade to avoid capture, eventually arriving in the liberated Republic of Užice. There, he joined the Supreme Command of the People's Liberation Army of Yugoslavia as a radio and cipher officer, and was actually badly injured in a November explosion. He moved with them into eastern Bosnia, where in 1942 he and his wife collaborated closely with Josip Broz Tito and he became one of the most important delegates to the AVNOJ. While Savić's contributions to the war effort weren't quite in his area of expertise, he was trusted by the Partisan leadership, and was put in charge of all matters of education, which he used to promote school participation in the liberated areas of the Bihać Republic.

As the Germans engaged in Operation Case White, Savić maintained his position with the Partisan Supreme Command, but fell out of favor in July 1943, and was demoted for reasons that are unclear. He nevertheless participated in the second convention of AVNOJ in November the same year, and in April 1944 was again promoted in the military, and sent on a mission to the Soviet Union. He arrived in Moscow where he also immediately engaged in scientific work with Pyotr Kapitsa and others, on the topic of liquid helium on extremely low temperatures. He returned home in October 1944 to liberated Belgrade, where he continued his socio-political activities as well as work on the restoration of the university. After the war had ended, he had another short stint in Moscow, but returned home to work on founding of an Institute of Physics, and was also promoted to a member of the Serbian Academy of Sciences and Arts in 1946 and 1948.

After the war he was one of the primary promoters of the idea of constructing the Vinča Nuclear Institute, as in 1948 Savić became the director of the then-Institute of Physics, the research center for the Yugoslav nuclear programme. As the political situation changed with the beginning of the Informbiro period the same year, he was forced to become independent of any help from the Soviet Union. Later, in 1958, he became a member of the Academy of Sciences of the Soviet Union.

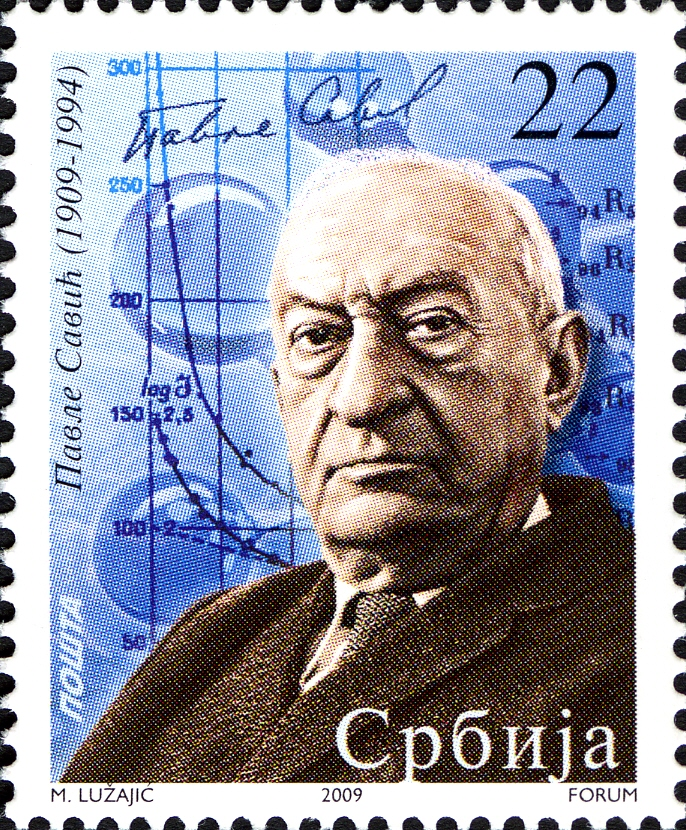
Serbian stamp from 2009, marking the 100th year since the birth of Pavle Savić

In 1966, he assumed an academic post at his alma mater, the University of Belgrade, as a professor at the Faculty of Mathematics and Natural Sciences, Department of Physical Chemistry and Department of Physics, now Faculty of Physics. In 1981, he took his retirement.

He was also the president of Serbian Academy of Sciences and Arts from 1971 to 1981, the year he retired.

He became a member of the New York Academy of Sciences in 1960, the Hungarian Academy of Sciences in 1970 and the Academy of Athens in 1975.

In 1987, he was mentioned in the so-called Vojko i Savle affair.

He published his last scientific paper a few months before his death, at the age of 85, in Belgrade.

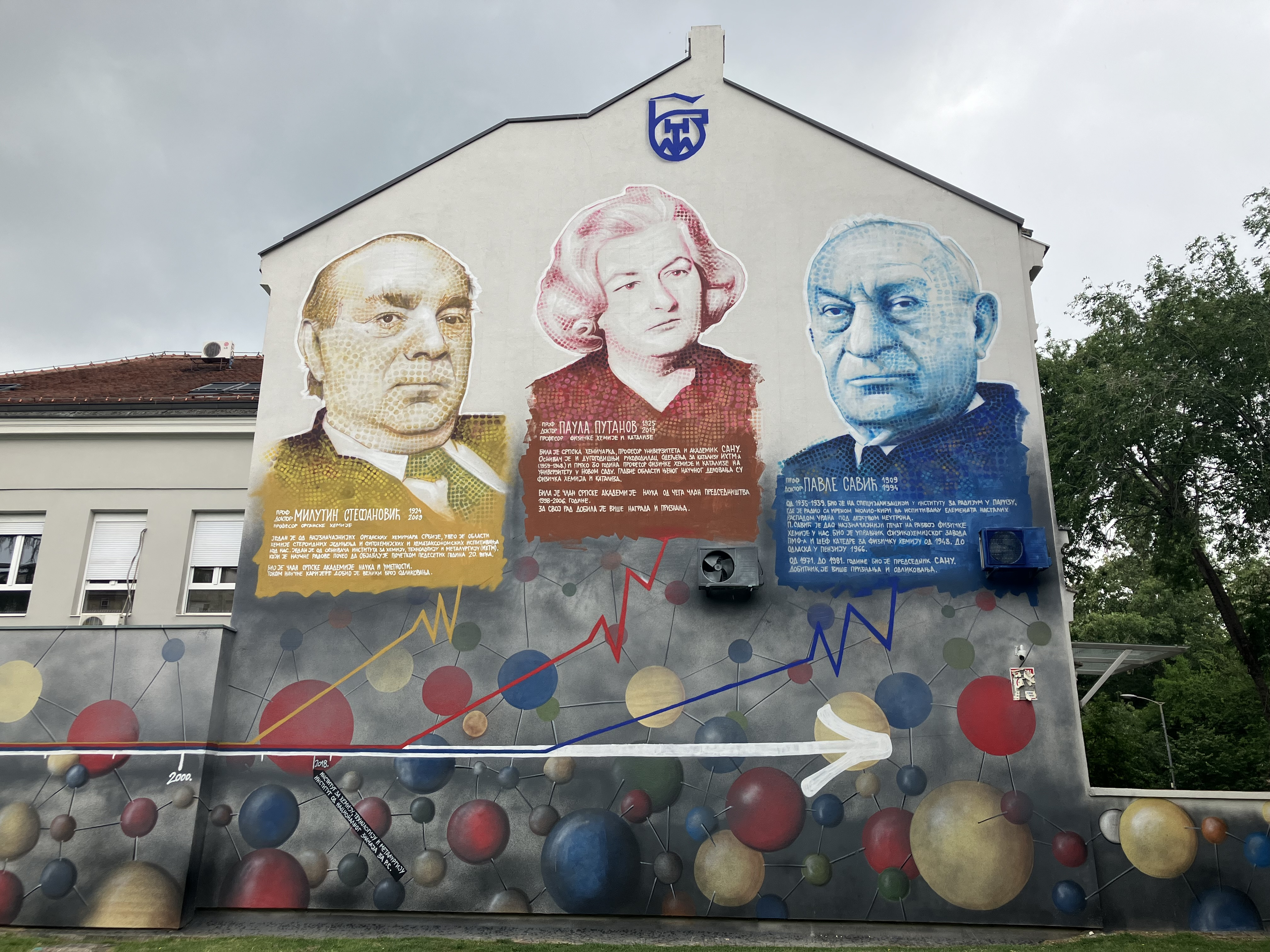
Mural at Institut za hemiju, tehnologiju i metalurgiju, Slavija, 2024

== Selected works ==
- Od atoma do nebeskih tela (1978)
- Nauka i društvo (1978)

== See also ==
- Radivoj Kašanin

== Sources ==
- Mićović, Vukić (1972). "Chemistry in Serbia - A Brief Historical Outline of the Development of Chemistry in Serbia, the Period 1843–1941". Glasnik Hemijskog društva - Beograd [Bulletin of the Chemical Society - Belgrade] (in Serbian). Vol. 37. Translated by Stanojević, Lazar. Belgrade: Serbian Chemical Society / NOLIT Publishing House for the U.S. Department of Commerce and National Science Foundation. pp. 29–52.
- Bondžić, Dragomir (2012). "15. Pavle Savić - naučnik u ratu" [15. Pavle Savić – A scientist in the war] (PDF). In Roksandić, Drago; Cvijović Javorina, Ivana (eds.). Intelektualci i rat 1939. – 1947. – Zbornik radova s Desničinih susreta 2012 Dio 1 [Intellectuals and war 1939–1947 – Proceedings from Desnica's Encounters 2012 Part 1]. Biblioteka Desničini susreti (in Serbian). Vol. 8. Centre for Comparative Historical and Intercultural Studies, Faculty of Humanities and Social Sciences, University of Zagreb. pp. 239–249.
- Subotić, Krunoslav (2002). Cekić, Božidar; Babić, Dragan (eds.). "Vinča Annual Report 2001". Institut za nuklearne nauke Vinča. ISSN 1451-2254.

Academic offices
| Preceded by Velibor Gligorić | President of Serbian Academy of Sciences and Arts; 1971–1981 | Succeeded by Dušan Kanazir |
