= Guéthary =

Guéthary Getaria
- Commune
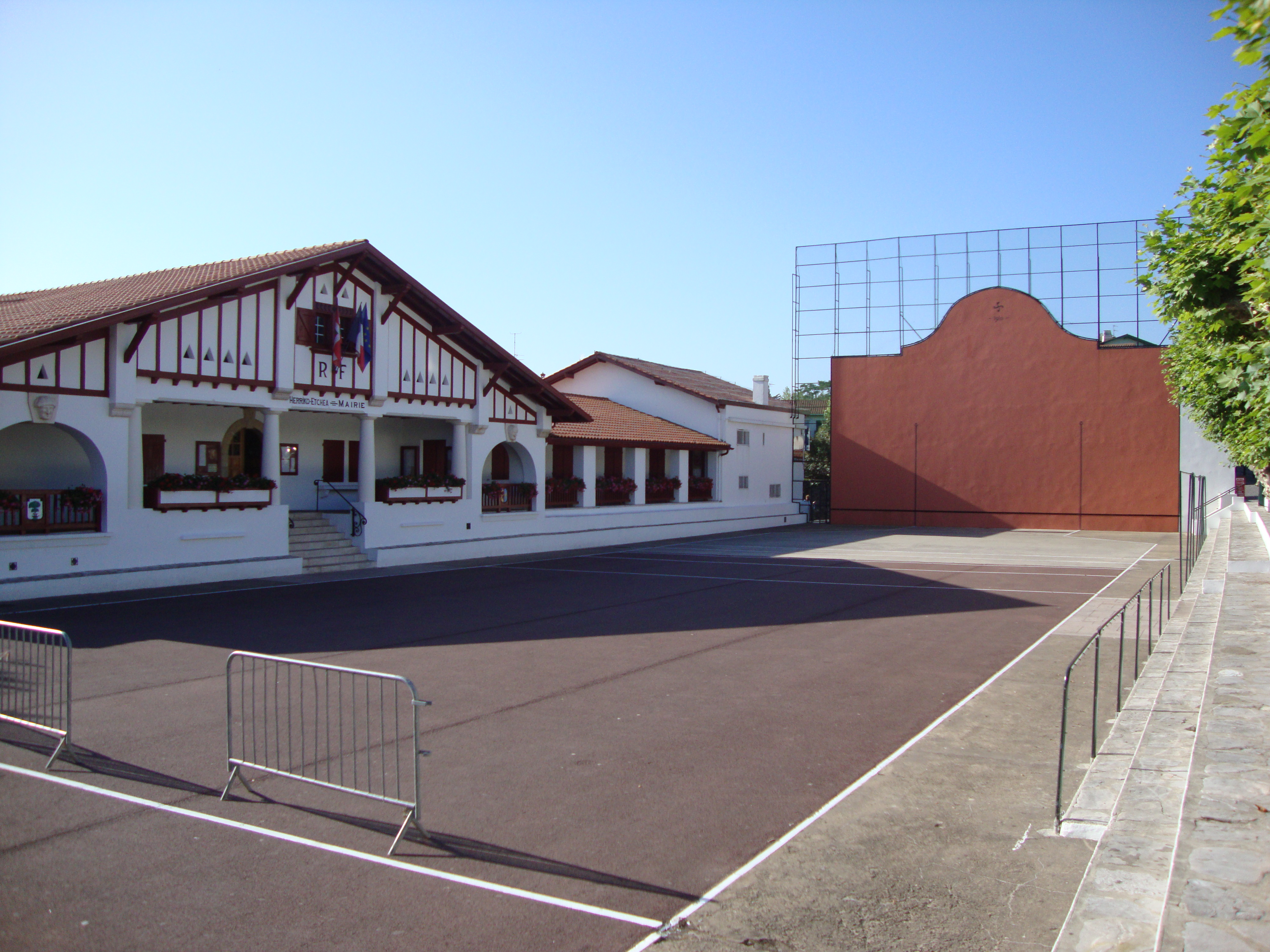
- The town hall and fronton of Guéthary

- Coat of arms
- Location of Guéthary
- Location within France Location within Nouvelle-Aquitaine
- Coordinates: 43°25′22″N 1°36′24″W
- Country: France
- Region: Nouvelle-Aquitaine
- Department: Pyrénées-Atlantiques
- Arrondissement: Bayonne
- Canton: Saint-Jean-de-Luz
- Intercommunality: CA Pays Basque

Government
  - Mayor (2020–2026): Marie-Pierre Burre-Cassou
- Area^{1}: 1 km^{2} (0.39 sq mi)
- Elevation: 40 m (130 ft)
- Highest elevation: 73 m (240 ft)
- Lowest elevation: 0 m (0 ft)
- Population (2023): 1,306
  - Density: 1,300/km^{2} (3,400/sq mi)
- Time zone: UTC+01:00 (CET)
  - Summer (DST): UTC+02:00 (CEST)
- INSEE/Postal code: 64249 /64210
- ^{1} French Land Register data, which excludes lakes, ponds, glaciers > 1 km^{2} (0.386 sq mi or 247 acres) and river estuaries.

Guéthary (French pronunciation: [ɡetaʁi]; Basque: Getaria) is a commune in the Pyrénées-Atlantiques department in southwestern France. It is located in the traditional Basque province of Labourd, the town traditionally standing on the northernmost coastal linguistic boundary of the Basque language. Guéthary station has rail connections to Hendaye, Bayonne and Bordeaux.

== History ==
Guéthary has existed as a small fishing village since the early 12th century. It became famous for hunting whales in the 13th century. The linguist Henri Gavel put down the name of the town to the Gascon word getari, 'post for watching' (the whales), while this assumption has been disputed by current linguists, who ultimately trace the name back to Latin caetaria (via Basque), 'fish processing facility', as supported by archaeological evidence unearthed both in Guéthary and the same name Getaria from Gipuzkoa.

== See also ==
- Communes of the Pyrénées-Atlantiques department
- The works of Maxime Real del Sarte
