= Milan Nedeljković =

Astronomy professor

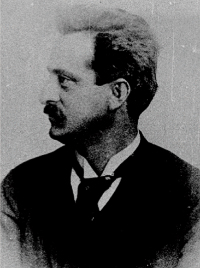
Milan G. Nedeljkovic

Milan G. Nedeljković (9 September 1857 - 21 February 1950) was the first modern professor of astronomy and meteorology at the Velika škola, and the founder and first director of the Astronomical and Meteorological Observatory in Belgrade.

== Biography ==
He was born in Kraljice Natalije, then Abadžijska Street in Belgrade, at the time in the Principality of Serbia, as the first of eight children (Milan, Đorđe, Nikola, Emilian, Vojislav, Ljubomir, Kosara and Spasenija) of the wealthy abadžija (tailor) Gligorije Nedeljković and mother Aleksandra. He finished the first men's high school as a student of the generation. At the Velika škola, at the Department of Natural Sciences and Mathematics, he graduated with great success and an award for his work in physics. At the college, he was immediately accepted as a trainee lecturer in physics and mathematics. However, at the suggestion of Josif Pančić, he received a scholarship to continue his education in Paris. He enrolled in mathematics at the Sorbonne and studied physics part-time at the Collège de France.

After five years of study in Paris, he returned to Belgrade with degrees in mathematics, physics, astronomy, meteorology, precision mechanics and seismology. At the Velika škola, he then opened the Department of Astronomy and Meteorology and immediately asked the Government of the Kingdom of Serbia to enable him to build an observatory that would be the central meteorological station. In 1887, he founded the Astronomical and Meteorological Observatory in Belgrade, where he performed the first seismological and geomagnetic measurements in Serbia at the beginning of the 20th century. He was the manager of the observatory until his retirement in 1924.

A significant work of Milan Nedeljković after the First World War, in which the Serbian people suffered severely, is the purchase of astronomical, meteorological and other geophysical instruments and accessories from which the Astronomical Observatory in Veliki Vračar was made, which began operating in 1932. The telescopes were procured in 1922 and delivered from Jena to Belgrade as war (World War I) reparations from Germany. The wealthy and educated wife of Tomanija (1866-1959) was of great help to Milan Nedeljković in astronomical and meteorological work all the time. All their lives, they set aside personal funds for these sciences.

He died in Belgrade, at the time in Yugoslavia.

== See also ==
- Petar Pavlović
- Milorad D. Dimitrijević

== Literature ==
- http://www.planeta.rs/24/12jubileji.htm - 150 years since the birth of Milan Nedeljković., Retrieved April 9, 2009.
- http://astro.matf.bg.ac.rs/sem001.htm - History of procurement of instruments for the astronomical observatory., Accessed on February 14, 2009.
- (language: English) V. Trajkovska, M. S. Dimitrijević. (2000). "Life and works of Milan Nedeljković (1857-1950)" (PDF). Serbian Astronomical Journal. 162: 135—150. Retrieved April 9, 2009. Check parameter value (s) for date: | access-date = (help)
