= Milivoje Lozanić =

Serbian chemist and professor

Milivoje S. Lozanić (24 April 1878 – 25 November 1963) was a Serbian chemist and professor at the University of Belgrade.

== Biography ==
Milivoje S. Lozanić was born in 1878 in Belgrade, at the time in the Principality of Serbia, as the son of chemists Sima Lozanić and Stanka, née Pačić. After two years of studying at the Velika škola in Belgrade, he studied at the Humboldt University of Berlin, where he received his doctorate. He was an assistant at the University of Danzig and then elected professor at the Faculty of Philosophy, i.e. the Faculty of Natural Sciences and Mathematics in Belgrade. He was elected assistant professor in 1908 and taught stereochemistry and analytical chemistry. From 1922 to 1924 when Sima Lozanić retired, his son Milivoje Lozanić took over the teaching of organic chemistry. But from 1924 to 1941, he began to hold lectures in both inorganic and organic chemistry. He was the dean of the Faculty of Philosophy at the University of Belgrade in 1935-1937. He was one of the members of the editorial board of the Sveznanje enciklopedija.

His main scientific papers were in organic chemistry (condensation of amino-aldehydes, lactones with aldehydes and ketones, etc.). He also worked on analytical chemistry and perfecting chemical apparatus.

He improved the teaching of chemistry. He carried out the reform of experimental work and practical teaching of chemistry at the University, following the example of European chemical institutes, as the first assistant professor of this group (1908). He was the first to synthesize cinchonic acid as part of the structure of the alkaloid cinchonine and performed other organic syntheses.

After the end of the Second World War in 1945, only full professor Milivoje Lozanić, associate professor Vukić Mićović and assistant Sergije Lebedev were at the Department of Chemistry at the Faculty of Science. He retired in 1955.

He was married to Olga Grujić, a court lady, the daughter of General Sava Grujić. They had two daughters, Stanka and Milica. Stanka was married to Patrick Maitland, 17th Earl of Lauderdale.

He died in Belgrade, at the time in SR Serbia, Yugoslavia.

== Sources ==
- Serbian Biographical Dictionary, Volume 5, pp. 612, Matica srpska, Novi Sad, 2011

== Literature ==
- Group of authors: "Chemistry: chemical technology", Prosveta, Belgrade, 1993, ISBN 978-86-07-00667-0, 519 pages.
