= Sima Lozanić =

Serbian chemist (1847 – 1935)

Simeon Sima Lozanić
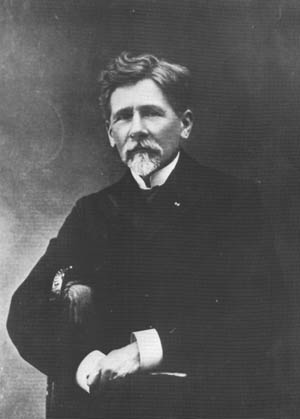
- Portrait of Sima Lozanić, 1905
- Born: February 24, 1847; Belgrade, Principality of Serbia
- Died: July 7, 1935; Belgrade, Kingdom of Yugoslavia
- Children: Milivoje S. Lozanić; Jelena Lozanić; Ana Marinković

Simeon Milivoje Lozanić and Simeon "Sima" Lozanić (Serbian Cyrillic: Сима Лозанић) (1847 – 1935) was a Serbian chemist, president of the Serbian Royal Academy, the first rector of the University of Belgrade, minister of foreign affairs, minister of industry and diplomat. At the Velika škola and later when it transformed into the University of Belgrade he taught chemistry and electrosynthesis. He published over 200 scientific papers and professional publications.

== Early years and education ==
Simeon Lozanić was born February 24, 1847, in Belgrade, Serbia. He completed legal studies in Belgrade, studied chemistry under Professor Johannes Wislicenus in Zürich and later with Professor August Wilhelm von Hofmann in Berlin. He earned his doctorate degree on March 19, 1870, at the University of Zurich. He was a professor at the "Great School" from 1872 and at the University of Belgrade Faculty of Philosophy until 1924.

== Career ==
When the University of Belgrade was founded in 1905, he was among the first eight full-time professors who selected the entire remaining academic staff. Sima Lozanić was then chosen as the first rector of the university. His 1905 opening ceremony words remained recorded as the following:

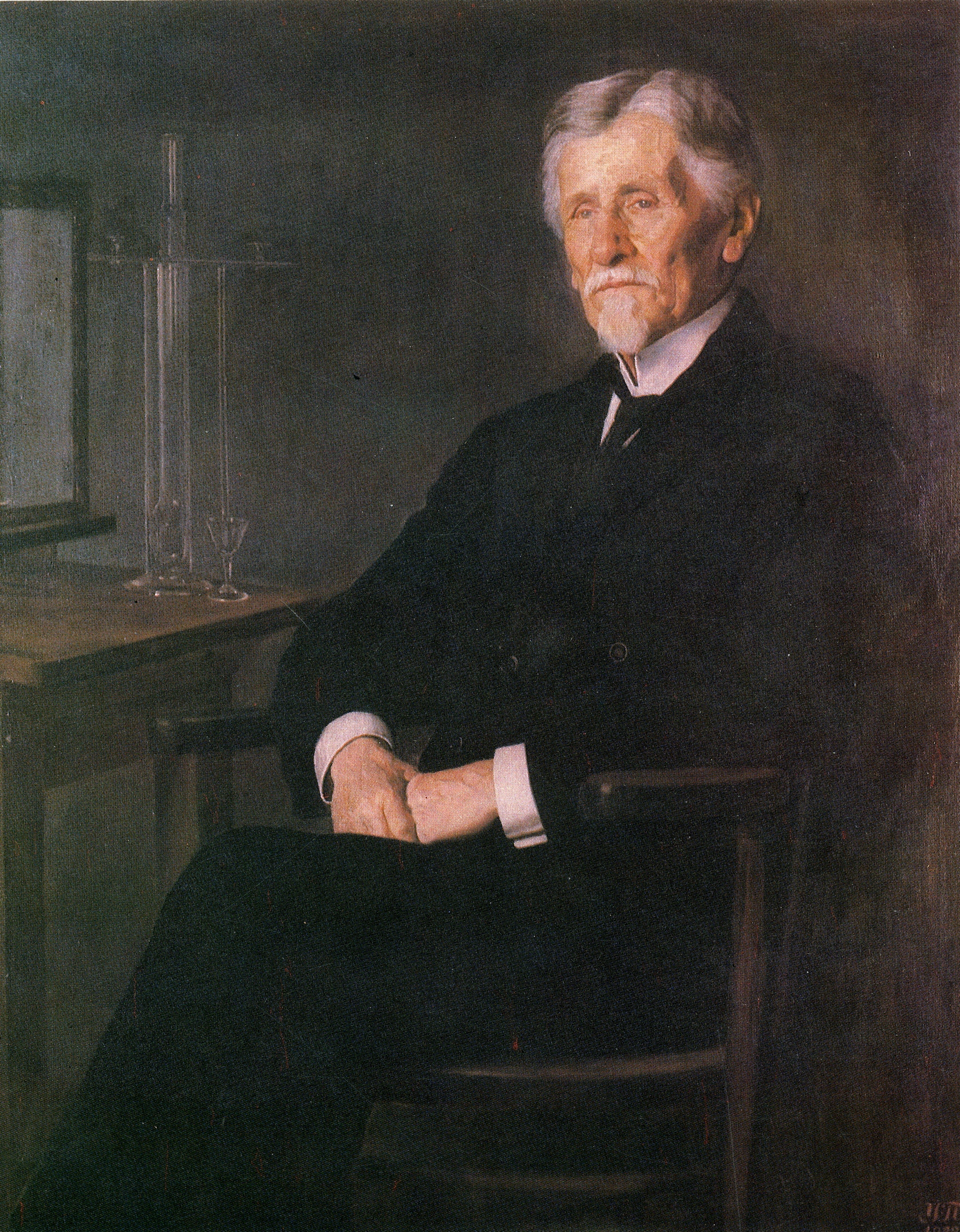
Portrait of Sima Lozanić by Uroš Predić

"Our previous belief that Serbian people will unite not by spelling books but by weapons was disastrous for our people's intellect. I believe the contrary - that education will be the main factor in solving that important question of ours and that it would have already been solved if we had better cared for our education. Therefore, I believe that education is the force that achieves all the goals. Had our education been more advanced, everything in the life of our people would have been better and more successful."

His chemistry classes paralleled, perhaps exceeded in some cases, those of the top European universities. They were organized with well-equipped laboratories and libraries, and produced some of the first chemistry textbooks. Lozanić himself wrote a number of textbooks, which covered various subject areas of chemistry: Inorganic chemistry, Organic chemistry, Analytical chemistry and Chemical technology. His textbooks were internationally renowned and in some areas groundbreaking. For example, Lozanić's Inorganic Chemistry textbook was the first European university textbook with Dmitriy Mendeleyev's periodic table of elements and one of the first containing a chapter on Thermochemistry. His Organic Chemistry textbooks are among the first books in which the compounds were represented by structural formulas.

He also did scientific and professional work related to all areas of Chemistry; some of his most valued works were about electrosynthesis in which he researched the reactions of CO and CO_{2} with other substances under the effect of electric discharge. He published over 200 scientific papers in applied and experimental chemistry.

Lozanić performed the first analysis of thermal water of Gamzigrad spa in 1889. He became a member of the Serbian Learned Society (Serbian Academy of Sciences and Arts) on January 30, 1873, associate member of Serbian Royal Academy on January 23, 1888, and became a full member on January 6, 1890. He was a president of Serbian Royal Academy twice - 1899 to 1900 and 1903 to 1906. From 1907 to 1912 he was a president of Serbian Chemistry Society.

He was the minister of industry from January 12, 1894, to March 21, 1894, and October 15, 1894, to June 25, 1895, and October 11, 1897, to June 30, 1899, minister of foreign affairs from March 21, 1894, to October 15, 1894, and from December 23, 1902, to March 23, 1903, as well as a diplomat and participant in all wars of the time. Lozanić was the ambassador of the Serbian government in London from 1900. He was a president of Serbian refugee aid committee in 1916 and a head of US mission for aid and support of Serbia from 1917.

He was the first honorary doctor of sciences of the University of Belgrade.

He died July 7, 1935, in Belgrade, in the age of 89. He was married to Stanka Pačić, the great-granddaughter of Lord Toma Vučić-Perišić. His son Milivoje S. Lozanić was also a chemist and inherited his university position as the professor of chemistry. Sima's two daughters, Ana Lozanić (1882-1973) (later married to minister Dr. Vojislav Marinković) became a well-known painter and Jelena Lozanić who, like her father, affirmed in humanitarian work and in the battle for women's rights, participated in international congresses in the United States in 1915 as a Serbian Red Cross delegate to enlist aid for her war desolated country.

== Legacy ==
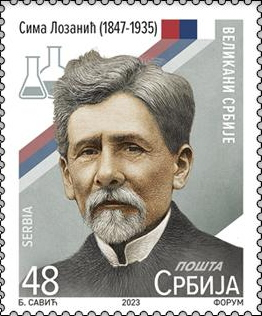
Lozanić on a 2023 stamp of Serbia

An exhibition "Sima Lozanić in Serbian science and culture" was held in his honor, organized by Serbian Academy of Sciences and Arts from January to March 1993, in Academy's gallery in Knez Mihailova street in Belgrade. His life and work was especially investigated by chemist Snežana Bojović, who wrote a 262-page book Sima Lozanić.

He is included in The 100 most prominent Serbs. A street in Dedinje is named after him. The Serbian Academy of Sciences and Arts declared 2023 as the year of Sima Lozanić.

He was decorated Order of St. Sava I and III degree, Order of the Cross of Takovo, Order of Miloš the Great III degree, Silver medal for bravery, Commemorative war medal, Order of the Redeemer I degree, Order of Orange-Nassau I degree, Order of Osmanieh I degree, Order of the crown of Romania I degree.

== See also ==
- Lozanić's triangle
- Jovan Žujović
- Jovan Cvijić

== Bibliography ==
- Bojovic, Snezana (1993). Sima Lozanic in Serbian science and culture. MHT. ISBN B0000D6RBS.
- Bojovic, Snezana (1996). Sima Lozanic, 1847-1935. Princip. ISBN 86-82273-04-7.
- "The List of the Ministers for Foreign Affairs since the Forming of the First Government in 1811 to This Day".
- "The Chemistry Faculty".

Government offices
Preceded by Đorđe Simić	Minister of Foreign Affairs; 1894	Succeeded by Milan Bogićević
Preceded by Raša Milošević	Minister of Industry; 1894–1895	Succeeded by Lazar R. Jovanović
Preceded by Lazar R. Jovanović	Minister of Industry; 1897–1899	Succeeded by Mihailo Petković
Preceded by Vasilije Antonić	Minister of Foreign Affairs; 1903–1904	Succeeded by Pavle Denić
Diplomatic posts
Preceded by Mihailo Milićević	Serbian ambassador to the British Empire; 1900–1902	Succeeded by Čedomilj Mijatović
Academic offices
Preceded by Post established	Rector of University of Belgrade; 1905–1906	Succeeded by Jovan Cvijić
Preceded by Jovan Ristić	President of Serbian Academy of Sciences and Arts; 1899–1900	Succeeded by Jovan Mišković
Preceded by Jovan Mišković	President of Serbian Academy of Sciences and Arts; 1903–1906	Succeeded by Stojan Novaković
Preceded by Dragoljub Pavlović	Dean of the Faculty of Philosophy; 1918–1919	Succeeded by Živojin Đorđević
