= Mirko Bajić =

Serbian politician

Mirko Bajić (Serbian Cyrillic: Мирко Бајић; born 13 June 1950) is a politician in Serbia from the country's Bunjevac community. He has at different times served in the Assembly of the Federal Republic of Yugoslavia, in the Assembly of Vojvodina, and as the deputy mayor of Subotica. He is now a member of the Subotica city assembly. Bajić has been the leader of the Alliance of Bačka Bunjevci (Savez bačkih Bunjevaca, SBB) since the party's establishment in 2007 and has served for many years on the Bunjevac National Council.

== Early life and private career ==
Bajić was born in the village of Đurđin in the municipality of Subotica, Autonomous Province of Vojvodina, in what was then the People's Republic of Serbia in the Federal People's Republic of Yugoslavia. He was raised in the community and graduated from the University of Novi Sad Faculty of Natural Sciences and Mathematics. He later became a physics teacher, and from 1983 to 1987 he was the director of the secondary medical school in Subotica.

== Politician ==
=== Early years (1987–2003) ===
Bajić entered political life in the 1980s, during the final years of the Socialist Federal Republic of Yugoslavia. From 1987 to 1992, he was a member of Subotica's executive council and the secretary for general administration.

For the 1992 Serbian parliamentary election, the Democratic Party (Demokratska stranka, DS) formed an alliance with the Reform Democratic Party of Vojvodina (Reformska demokratska stranka Vojvodine, RDSV). Bajić appeared in the thirteenth position on the shared electoral list of the parties for the Zrenjanin division. The list did not win any mandates.

Bajić was elected to the Subotica municipal assembly in the 1996 Serbian local elections as a candidate of the Alliance of Citizens of Subotica (SGS), which won six seats. No single party or alliance won a majority in the municipal assembly, and a new local administration was initially formed with members of the Alliance of Vojvodina Hungarians (Savez vojvođanskih Mađara, SVM), the Socialist Party of Serbia (Socijalistička partija Srbije, SPS), and Bajić's group. Bajić was chosen as first deputy speaker when the assembly convened in early 1997; at the time, this position was equivalent to deputy mayor. SVM leader József Kasza, with whom Bajić often had fraught relations, was selected as mayor. The Subotica Civic Alliance later participated in the 1997 Serbian parliamentary election in the Subotica division; Bajić was the list bearer, although he was not a candidate. The list did not, in any event, win any mandates.

Bajić emerged as a prominent opponent of Slobodan Milošević's administration in the late 1990s. He became the president of the Association of Free Cities and Municipalities of Serbia in 1999; in this capacity, he took part in international discussions around lifting the sanctions regime against Serbia, which he argued was disproportionally harming the civilian population. He also represented the Subotica Civic Alliance in negotiations among Serbia's opposition parties for participation in upcoming elections.

By the time of the 2000 Yugoslavian general election, Bajić was a member of the Democratic Party, which contested the election as part of the Democratic Opposition of Serbia (Demokratska opozicija Srbije, DOS), a broad and ideologically diverse coalition of parties opposed to Slobodan Milošević's administration. Bajić appeared in the lead position on the alliance's list in Subotica for the Yugoslavian parliament's Chamber of Citizens and received an automatic mandate when the list won two out of three seats. Milošević was defeated for the Yugoslavian presidency in this election, an event that caused significant changes in Serbian and Yugoslavian politics. The DOS won a majority of federal seats in Serbia and became the dominant force in Yugoslavia's new coalition government; Bajić initially served as a government supporter. He was also re-elected to the Subotica municipal assembly in the concurrent 2000 local elections.

Bajić subsequently became an extremely vocal opponent of József Kasza, whom he accused of large-scale corruption. Kasza had become a deputy prime minister of Serbia in the DOS's administration in January 2001, and Bajić's stance caused friction with other members of his party. The DS ultimately revoked his membership in late 2002 and excluded him from the Subotica assembly (which they had the right to do under Serbia's election laws in effect at the time). In January 2003, Bajić said that his former colleagues had "stabbed him in the back" because of his accusations against Kasza. He later became a member of the People's Democratic Party (Narodna demokratska stranka, NDS).

The Federal Republic of Yugoslavia was reconstituted as the State Union of Serbia and Montenegro in 2003, and the Chamber of Citizens ceased to exist. Bajić's term as a federal parliamentarian ended on 3 March 2003. On his last day in office, he filed several criminal charges against current and former leaders of Subotica. He was subsequently re-elected to the Subotica municipal assembly in a June 2003 by-election, winning in the Mali Bajmok division.

=== Since 2004 ===
Bajić was elected to the Vojvodina provincial assembly in the 2004 provincial election, winning Subotica's second division as a candidate of the citizens' group "Subotica Our City." For the concurrent 2004 Serbian local elections, Serbia introduced the direct election of mayors and proportional representation for local assembly elections. Bajić ran for mayor of Subotica, finishing third, and appeared on the "Subotica Our Home" list for the local assembly, receiving a mandate after the list won five seats.

Shortly after the 2004 elections, the NDS merged into the Democratic Party of Serbia (Demokratska stranka Srbije, DSS). Bajić did not take part in the merger but instead established the People's Democratic Party of Vojvodina (Narodna demokratska stranka Vojvodine, NDSV) as a Bunjevac party, with himself as leader. The NDSV participated in the 2007 Serbian parliamentary election on the list of the Democratic Party and, somewhat ironically, Bajić appeared on the DS's list as a NDSV representative. He indicated that NDSV's main purpose was to ensure the Bunjevci would have rights equal to those of other national minority communities. The DS list won sixty-four mandates, and Bajić, who appeared in the twenty-seventh position, was not selected to serve in the national assembly. (From 2000 to 2011, all parliamentary mandates were awarded to sponsoring parties or coalitions rather than to individual candidates, and it was common practice for the mandates to be distributed out of numerical order. The list was mostly alphabetical in any event.) The SBB was created after the 2007 election, either as a reconstituted version of the NDSV or as a successor party, and Bajić was again chosen as the party's leader.

The SBB contested the 2008 Serbian parliamentary election on its own, with Bajić leading a list of seven candidates. The list did not win any mandates. Bajić was also defeated in his bid for re-election in the 2008 provincial election, and his "Together for a Better Subotica" list narrowly missed the electoral threshold to win seats in the 2008 local elections.

Bajič led the SBB's list for Subotica (which by this time had become a city) in the 2012 local elections and returned to the assembly when the list won two mandates. The SBB supported the local government after the election, and Bajić was appointed as an assistant to the assembly president. He also sought re-election to the Vojvodina assembly in the 2012 provincial election and was defeated in the first round of voting. He again led the SBB's list for Subotica in the 2016 local election and was re-elected when the list won a single mandate. For the 2020 local election, he led a combined list of the SBB and the group "Bunjevci for Subotica" and was elected to another term when the list won two mandates. He remains a member of the city assembly as of 2021. In March 2021, he welcomed a decision by the city government to recognize the Bunjevac language as the fourth official language of the city.

The SBB also contested the 2020 Serbian parliamentary election on the For the Kingdom of Serbia list led by the Movement for the Restoration of the Kingdom of Serbia (Pokret obnove Kraljevine Srbije, POKS), and Bajić appeared on the list in the thirty-first position. The list narrowly missed crossing the electoral threshold.

== Bunjevac community representative ==
Bajić is a prominent member of Serbia's Bunjevac community and has served several terms on the Bunjevac National Council. He has consistently articulated the view that the Bunjevci are a distinct people with a distinct history and has opposed efforts to classify Bunjevci within Serbia's Croat community. In 2006, he strongly criticized Petar Kuntić of the Democratic Alliance of Croats in Vojvodina for the latter's statement that Bunjevci would soon cease to be a distinct community. He made similar criticisms of Croatian president Zoran Milanović's 2021 statement that Bunjevci are Croats, describing the remark as a call for "violent assimilation," inappropriate for the leader of a serious European state. Bajić has frequently condemned the Assembly of Vojvodina's 1945 order that Bunjevci be considered as Croats and has called for the modern provincial assembly to formally declare the order as null-and-void.

Bajić was re-elected the Bunjevac National Council in the direct elections of 2014 and 2018.

== Electoral record ==
=== Provincial (Vojvodina) ===
2012 Vojvodina assembly election Subotica II (constituency seat) - First and Second Rounds
Daniel Kovačić (incumbent)	Choice for a Better Vojvodina–Bojan Pajtić (Affiliation: Democratic Party)	3,529	19.06	9,673	62.45
Jožef Hegediš	Alliance of Vojvodina Hungarians	3,227	17.43	5,815	37.55
Mirko Bajić	Alliance of Bačka Bunjevci	2,986	16.13		
Renata Babić	Let's Get Vojvodina Moving–Tomislav Nikolić (Serbian Progressive Party, New Serbia, Movement of Socialists, Strength of Serbia Movement)	1,990	10.75		
Mirana Dmitrović	League of Social Democrats of Vojvodina–Nenad Čanak	1,769	9.55		
Danijela Tomić	United Regions of Serbia	1,261	6.81		
Predrag Bobić	Socialist Party of Serbia (SPS)–Party of United Pensioners of Serbia (PUPS)–United Serbia (JS)–Social Democratic Party of Serbia (SDP Serbia)	1,098	5.93		
Josip Ivanković	U-Turn	1,089	5.88		
Tihomir Anišić	Citizens' Group: Beautiful Vojvodina	825	4.46		
Zoran Vidaković	Serbian Radical Party	742	4.01		
Total valid votes		18,516	100	15,488	100

2008 Vojvodina assembly election Subotica II (constituency seat) - First and Second Rounds
Daniel Kovačić	For a European Vojvodina: Democratic Party–G17 Plus, Boris Tadić (Affiliation: Democratic Party)	4,910	23.17	9,124	70.73
Mirko Bajić (incumbent)	Citizens' Group: Together for a Better Subotica	6,216	29.33	3,776	29.27
Laszlo Barat	Hungarian Coalition–István Pásztor	3,405	16.07		
Ivan Francišković	Liberal Democratic Party	1,782	8.41		
Stipan Stipić	Together for Vojvodina–Nenad Čanak	1,501	7.08		
Radmilo Todosijević	Serbian Radical Party	1,426	6.73		
Josip Ivanković	Democratic Union of Croats	1,181	5.57		
Branko Pokornić	Socialist Party of Serbia (SPS)–Party of United Pensioners of Serbia (PUPS)	771	3.64		
Total valid votes		21,192	100	12,900	100
Invalid ballots		694		387	
Total votes casts		21,886	63.41	13,287	38.50

2004 Vojvodina provincial election: Subotica Division 2
Candidate	Party	First round		Second round	
Candidate	Party	Votes	%	Votes	%
Mirko Bajić	Coalition: Subotica Our City	4,064	31.41	6,456	54.78
Petar Kuntić	Democratic Alliance of Croats in Vojvodina	2,536	19.60	5,329	45.22
Stipan Stipić (incumbent)	Coalition: "Together for Vojvodina–Nenad Čanak"	1,954	15.10		
Zorica Zrnić	Serbian Radical Party	1,386	10.71		
Mr (Note: Note: In this context, "Mr" stands for "Master" and refers to the candidate's academic credentials.) Miroslav Čavlin	Democratic Party of Serbia	819	6.33		
Mirko Prćić	G17 Plus	815	6.30		
Jelena Birovljev	Strength of Serbia Movement	725	5.60		
Nikola Vizin	Bunjevac Party	639	4.94		
Total		12,938	100.00	11,785	100.00
Valid votes		12,938	96.06	11,785	95.38
Invalid/blank votes		531	3.94	571	4.62
Total votes		13,469	100.00	12,356	100.00

=== Municipal (Subotica) ===
2004 Municipality of Subotica local election: Mayor of Subotica
Candidate	Party	First round		Second round	
Candidate	Party	Votes	%	Votes	%
Géza Kucsera (incumbent)	Alliance of Vojvodina Hungarians	16,667	31.89	25,018	50.11
Oliver Dulić	Democratic Party–Boris Tadić	8,474	16.21	24,905	49.89
Mirko Bajić	Coalition: Subotica Our City	6,878	13.16		
Radmilo Todosijević	Serbian Radical Party–Tomislav Nikolić	5,129	9.81		
József Miskolczi	Citizens' Group	3,322	6.36		
Blaško Gabrić	Citizens' Group: Da Subotici Svane	3,216	6.15		
Tomislav Stantić	G17 Plus	3,013	5.76		
Aleksandar Evetović	Strength of Serbia Movement	1,798	3.44		
Čaba Šepšei	Democratic Party of Vojvodina Hungarians	1,534	2.93		
Edit Stevanović	Coalition: "Together for Vojvodina–Nenad Čanak"	1,192	2.28		
Srećko Novaković	Democratic Party of Serbia	1,043	2.00		
Total		52,266	100.00	49,923	100.00
Valid votes		52,266	98.42	49,923	97.13
Invalid/blank votes		841	1.58	1,477	2.87
Total votes		53,107	100.00	51,400	100.00
Registered voters/turnout		127,986	41.49	127,986	40.16

15 June 2003 Subotica municipal by-election Municipal Assembly of Subotica – Division 19 (Mali Bajmok)
Mirko Bajić	People's Democratic Party	274	46.21
Ivan Budinčević	Democratic Alliance of Croats in Vojvodina	94	15.85
Imre Čeke	Alliance of Vojvodina Hungarians	91	15.35
Ljerka Dražić	For a European Subotica (Democratic Party, Civic Alliance of Serbia, Liberals of Serbia, Christian Democratic Party of Serbia, Democratic Centre, Social Democratic Party)	62	10.46
Petar Balažević	Reformists of Vojvodina–Social Democratic Party–Alliance of Subotica Citizens	31	5.23
Stevan Nemet	Citizens' Group	28	4.72
Šaša Marijanušić	League of Social Democrats of Vojvodina	13	2.19
Total valid votes		593	100
