= Imre Kern =

Serbian politician

- Имре Керн

Deputy Mayor of Subotica
- In office 21 August 2020 – 10 July 2024
- Preceded by: Timea Horvat
- Succeeded by: Csilla Góli

Member of the Assembly of Vojvodina for Subotica Division 7
- In office 23 October 2000 – 30 October 2004
- Preceded by: József Miskolczi
- Succeeded by: redistribution

President of the Executive Board of the City Assembly of Subotica
- In office 29 June 1992 – 16 May 2002
- Preceded by: Branimir Marković
- Succeeded by: Géza Kucsera

Personal details
- Born: 1949 (age 76–77) Bačka Topola, PR Serbia, FPR Yugoslavia
- Party: VMSZ (since 1994)

Imre Kern (Serbian Cyrillic: Имре Керн; born 1949) is a Serbian administrator and politician from the country's Hungarian community. He was president of the Subotica city assembly's executive board from 1992 to 2002 and was the city's deputy mayor from 2020 to 2024. Kern was also a delegate in the Vojvodina provincial assembly from 2000 to 2004, a deputy provincial secretary in the Vojvodina government from 2002 to 2004, and a state secretary in the Serbian government from 2014 to 2020. He is a member of the Alliance of Vojvodina Hungarians (VMSZ).

== Early life and private career ==
Kern was born in Bačka Topola, Autonomous Province of Vojvodina, in what was then the People's Republic of Serbia in the Federal People's Republic of Yugoslavia. He completed elementary and high school in Subotica, graduated from the University of Belgrade Faculty of Technology and Metallurgy in 1974, and worked for the chemical firm Zorka in Subotica from 1974 to 1992. He was responsible for the construction of a new fertilizer factory and held various leadership roles in the factory.

From 2004 to 2007, Kern was the project manager for the construction of a wastewater treatment plant in Subotica. From 2007 to 2014, he was deputy director of Vojvodina's capital investment fund.

== Politician ==
=== Early years in Subotica (1992–2000) ===
Kern was elected to the Subotica city assembly as an independent candidate in the May 1992 Serbian local elections, the first to be held after the country's de jure return to multiparty democracy in 1990. During the 1990s, Serbia's political culture was dominated by the authoritarian rule of Socialist Party of Serbia (SPS) leader Slobodan Milošević and his allies, and many opposition parties boycotted the May 1992 elections on the grounds that conditions for a fair vote did not exist. The Democratic Fellowship of Vojvodina Hungarians (VMDK), at the time the leading party in Serbia's Hungarian community, chose to participate, arguing that it did not want the SPS to win by default in predominantly Hungarian areas. Subotica was one of the relatively few jurisdictions where the opposition was successful: the VMDK finished first with twenty-six seats out of sixty-seven and afterward formed a coalition government with the Democratic Alliance of Croats in Vojvodina (DSHV). Incumbent mayor József Kasza of the VMDK was confirmed for a new term in office on 29 June 1992, and Kern, who was aligned with the new administration, was chosen as president of the city assembly's executive board on the same day, effectively becoming prime minister of the city government.

Due to widespread doubts about the legitimacy of the May 1992 elections, the Serbian government called new local elections for December 1992. This time, most opposition parties chose to participate. Kern was re-elected to the Subotica assembly as an independent candidate endorsed by the VMDK. The VMDK-DSHV alliance won an increased victory in the city overall, and on 12 January 1993 Kasza was confirmed for a third term as mayor and Kern for a second term as executive board president. Subotica remained one of the few cities in Serbia governed by the opposition.

The VMDK experienced a serious split in 1994, with several leading party members, including Kasza, leaving to form the Alliance of Vojvodina Hungarians. Kern became a member of the new party.

The 1996 local elections in Subotica did not produce a clear winner. Although the VMSZ was the largest party in the new assembly, the Socialists and their allies significantly improved their standing, and no party or alliance commanded a working majority. Kasza was confirmed for a fourth term as mayor on 3 January 1997, but members of rival parties were chosen for deputy mayor roles. Kern, who was re-elected to the assembly as a VMSZ candidate, was chosen for a third term as executive board president by a secret ballot on 21 January 1997, after a long and contentious debate.

Kern appeared in the sixth position (out of six) on the VMSZ's electoral list for the Subotica division in the 1997 Serbian parliamentary election. The list won three seats, and he was not chosen for a mandate. (From 1992 to 2000, Serbia's electoral law stipulated that one-third of parliamentary mandates would be assigned to candidates from successful lists in numerical order, while the remaining two-thirds would be distributed amongst other candidates at the discretion of the sponsoring parties. It was common practice for the latter mandates to be awarded out of order. Kern could have been awarded a mandate despite his list position, but, in the event, he was not.)

=== The 2000 elections and after (2000–14) ===
In 2000, the VMSZ joined the Democratic Opposition of Serbia (DOS), a coalition of parties opposed to the continued rule of Slobodan Milošević and his allies. DOS candidate Vojislav Koštunica defeated Milošević in the 2000 Yugoslavian presidential election, and Milošević subsequently fell from power on 5 October 2000, a watershed moment in Serbian and Yugoslavian politics.

The DOS, led locally by the VMSZ, also won a landslide victory in Subotica in the 2000 Serbian local elections, which took place concurrently with the Yugoslavian vote. When the new assembly met on 17 October 2000, Kasza was chosen for a fifth term as mayor, and Kern was chosen for a fourth term as executive board president.

Kern was also elected to the Vojvodina assembly for Subotica's seventh division in the 2000 provincial election, which was held concurrently with the Yugoslavian and local elections. The DOS and VMSZ won a landslide majority victory, and he served afterward as a supporter of the administration.

In 2002, Kern was appointed as deputy provincial secretary for environmental protection and sustainable development. He stood down as president of Subotica's executive board on 16 May 2002.

Serbia's electoral laws were reformed after the fall of Milošević; among several other changes, subsequent local elections took place under proportional representation and Vojvodina provincial elections under mixed proportional representation. Kern appeared in the second position on the VMSZ's electoral list for the 2004 Serbian local elections and was re-elected when the list won sixteen seats, placing first among the eleven parties or alliances that won representation in the city assembly. He served as a supporter of the local VMSZ-led administration for the next four years and was not a candidate in the 2008 local elections.

Kern also appeared in the twenty-third position on the VMSZ's electoral list in the 2004 Vojvodina provincial election. The party won six proportional seats, and he was not given a mandate for a second term.

He was given the tenth position on the VMSZ's electoral list in the 2007 Serbian parliamentary election and the seventy-sixth position on the VMSZ-led Hungarian Coalition list in the 2008 parliamentary election. The lists won three and four seats in the Serbian parliament, respectively, and he was not chosen for a mandate on either occasion. (From 2000 to 2011, all Serbian parliamentary mandates were assigned to candidates on successful lists at the discretion of the sponsoring parties, irrespective of numerical order. Kern could have been assigned a seat on either occasion despite his list position, but he was not.)

Serbia's electoral laws were again reformed in 2011, such that all parliamentary mandates were awarded to candidates on successful lists in numerical order. Kern was a nominal VMSZ candidate in the 2012 parliamentary election, appearing in the one hundredth position on the party's list. Election from this position was not a realistic prospect, and he was not elected when the list won five seats.

=== State Secretary, Deputy Mayor, and after (2014–present) ===
Kern appeared in the thirty-seventh position on the VMSZ's list in the 2014 parliamentary election and was not elected when the list won six seats. After the election, the VMSZ began supporting Serbia's government led by the Serbian Progressive Party (SNS) in the national assembly. The VMSZ received a number of state secretary positions, and in May 2014 Kern was appointed as a state secretary in the ministry of construction, transport, and infrastructure.

Kern was promoted to the eleventh position on the VMSZ's list in the 2016 parliamentary election and missed election when the list won four seats. The VMSZ continued supporting the SNS government after the election, and Kern was appointed to a second term as state secretary, serving until 2020. He worked on infrastructure projects including the Žeželj Bridge and the Obrenovac-Surčin highway, oversaw the Belgrade-to-Novi Sad section of the Belgrade-to-Budapest high-speed rail project, and led the World Bank project, "Improvement of Land Administration in the Republic of Serbia.

In the 2017 Serbian presidential election, he articulated his party's support for SNS candidate Aleksandar Vučić.

The VMSZ led a successful campaign to increase its parliamentary representation in the 2020 parliamentary election, winning nine seats. Kern, who appeared in the sixteenth position on the party's list, was again not elected. He also appeared in the second position on the party's list for Subotica in the concurrent 2020 Serbian local elections, however, and was re-elected to the city assembly after a twelve-year absence when the party won twenty-two seats, finishing second against the SNS. The SNS and VMSZ established a coalition government after the election, and on 21 August 2020 he was appointed as the city's deputy mayor.

Kern appeared in the 161st position on the VMSZ's list in the 2023 parliamentary election; this was again a nominal candidacy, and he was not elected when the party won six seats. He did not run in the 2024 Serbian local elections, and his term as deputy mayor ended in that year.

== Electoral record ==
=== Provincial (Vojvodina) ===
2000 Vojvodina provincial election: Subotica Division 7
| Candidate | Party | Votes | % |
|---|---|---|---|
| Imre Kern | Alliance of Vojvodina Hungarians | | elected |
| Tibor Árokszállási | Serbian Radical Party | | |
| other candidates | | | |
| Total | | | |

=== Local (Subotica) ===
2000 Subotica city election: Division 44 (Palić 1)
| Candidate | Party | Votes | % |
|---|---|---|---|
| Imre Kern (incumbent) | Democratic Opposition of Serbia (Affiliation: Alliance of Vojvodina Hungarians) | | elected |
| Tibor Kis | Citizens' Group | | |
| Géza Madai | Alliance of Citizens of Subotica–Reformists of Vojvodina | | |
| Erika Malešević | Socialist Party of Serbia–Yugoslav Left | | |
| Krisztián Orkity | Democratic Party of Vojvodina Hungarians | | |
| Goran Uglješić | Serbian Radical Party | | |
| Total | | | |
Source: All candidates except Kern are listed alphabetically.

1996 Subotica city election: Division 44 (Palić 1)
| Candidate | Party | First round | | Second round | |
| Candidate | Party | Votes | % | Votes | % |
|---|---|---|---|---|---|
| Imre Kern (incumbent) | Alliance of Vojvodina Hungarians | | 45.77 | | elected in the second round |
| Attila Szám | Socialist Party of Serbia | | 7.54 | | defeated in the second round |
| Simeon Jovanović | Yugoslav Left | | | | |
| Tibor Kis | Citizens' Group | | | | |
| Ljubinko Marjanović | Serbian Radical Party | | | | |
| Róbert Nagy Némédi | Alliance of Citizens of Subotica | | | | |
| Zoltán Skala | Citizens' Group | | | | |
| Đorđe Škrbić | Zajedno (Coalition Together) | | | | |
| Sándor Szebenyi | Democratic Fellowship of Vojvodina Hungarians | | | | |
| Ignacije Tonković | New Democracy | | | | |
| Total | | | | | |
Source: All candidates except Kern and Szám are listed alphabetically.

December 1992 Subotica city election: Division 44 (Palić 1)
| Candidate | Party | Votes | % |
|---|---|---|---|
| Imre Kern (incumbent) | Citizens' Group | | elected in the first round |
| Zoran Savić | Socialist Party of Serbia | | |
| Total | | | |

May 1992 Subotica city election: Division 44 (Palić 1)
| Candidate | Party | Votes | % |
|---|---|---|---|
| Imre Kern | Citizens' Group | | elected in the first round |
| Ivica Mamužić | Citizens' Group | | |
| Zoran Savić | Socialist Party of Serbia | | |
| Total | | | |
Source: Mamužić and Savić are listed alphabetically.
