= SANU Memorandum =

1986 SANU draft document

- Created: May 1985–September 1986
- Presented: 1986 (leaked)
- Location: Belgrade, Serbia
- Commissioned by: Serbian Academy of Sciences and Arts members
- Author: 16-member commission
- Media type: Typewritten document
- Purpose: memorandum

The Memorandum of the Serbian Academy of Sciences and Arts, known simply as the SANU Memorandum (Serbian Cyrillic: Меморандум САНУ), was a draft document produced by a 16-member committee of the Serbian Academy of Sciences and Arts (SANU) from 1985 to 1986.

The memo immediately captured the public's attention in Yugoslavia, as it gave voice to controversial views on the state of the nation and argued for a fundamental reorganization of the state. The main theme was that Yugoslavia's constitutional structure discriminated against the Serbs, and that decentralisation was leading to the disintegration of Yugoslavia. It claimed that Serbia's development was eroded in favour of other parts of Yugoslavia, or rather that other more developed regions flourished at Serbia's expense. The memorandum was officially denounced by the government of Yugoslavia in 1986, and the government of the SR Serbia for inciting nationalism. Some consider its publication to be a key moment in the breakup of Yugoslavia and a contributor to the Yugoslav wars.

== Overview ==
In the 1980s, a major issue in Yugoslavia was the problem of massive debts accrued in the 1970s and the resulting policies of austerity. Yugoslavia had debts initially valued at $6 billion US dollars, but which turned out to actually be a sum equal to $21 billion U.S. dollars, a staggering debt load. The high debt load led to repeated programmes of austerity in the 1980s imposed by the IMF, and which in turn led to the exposure of so much corruption by the Communist authorities that it had caused a crisis of faith in the Communist system by the mid-1980s. The revelation that corruption was systematic in Yugoslavia and that the Communist elites were plundering the public coffers to support their luxurious lifestyles sparked much resentment, especially at a time of austerity. The fact that it had been the Communist elites who had run up the debts in the 1970s that had led to the austerity policies imposed in the 1980s not only made them unpopular, but also created grave doubts about the competence of the elites. Making the economic crisis more difficult was that Croatia and Slovenia were wealthier than Serbia, and objected to transferring their wealth to support Serbia in times of austerity.

In May 1985, after Ivan Stambolić urged the government to discuss Kosovo for the first time since 1981, SANU selected a committee of sixteen distinguished academics to draft a memorandum addressing the causes of the economic and political crisis and how to tackle the problems. It was planned to be endorsed by the academy prior to being presented to the Communist Party and state organs. The last draft, however, was leaked to a regime tabloid, the Serbian newspaper Večernje novosti in September 1986. The newspaper attacked it, describing it as reactionary and nationalist, but did not publish it. An official campaign by the Serbian state and party officials began against it.

The memo is divided into two parts: the "Crisis in the Yugoslav Economy and Society" and the "Status of Serbia and the Serb Nation". The first section focuses on the economic and political fragmentation of Yugoslavia that followed the promulgation of the 1974 constitution. The memo argued that because Tito had been a Croat, he had designed the Yugoslav federation in such a way to unduly balance the entire economic and political system in favor of his native Croatia together with Slovenia. In this way, the memo claimed that the burden of austerity policies imposed by the IMF fell almost entirely on the Serbs, while at the same time allowing Croatia and Slovenia to keep too much of their wealth to themselves. The second section focuses on what the authors saw as Serbia's inferior status in Yugoslavia, while describing the status of Serbs in the province of Kosovo and in Croatia in such a way as to make its point. The memo argued that because the Serbian provincial authorities in both Kosovo and Vojvodina could deal directly with the federal Yugoslav government, this had made them de facto republics outside of the control of the Socialist Republic of Serbia. Since March 1981, there had been regular riots in Kosovo between the ethnic Albanian majority and Serb minority, which in turn had been caused by the competition in the labour market in a time of austerity as the university system produced far more graduates than there were available jobs. The memo claimed that the other republics, especially Croatia, were supporting the Albanian provincial government in Kosovo as part of a plot to force out the Serb minority. Kosta Mihailović made contributions to the economy, Mihailo Marković on self-management and Vasilije Krestić on the status of the Serbs of Croatia.

The memo claimed that at the end of World War II, Tito deliberately weakened Serbia by dividing up the majority of Serbian territory, namely present day Serbia, Montenegro, North Macedonia, Bosnia and Croatia, with Serb majority populations. The memo argued that Tito further weakened the SR Serbia by dividing its territory and creating the autonomous provinces of Kosovo and Vojvodina, which was not reciprocated in the other Yugoslav republics. A major theme of the memo was that of alleged Serbian victimization at the hands of the other republics, who were portrayed as having profited at Serbia's expense. The authors of the memo wrote that it was time to "...remove this historical guilt off of the Serbian people and to refute officially the claims that they had an economically privileged position between the two wars and that there would be no denying of their liberating role throughout history and their contribution in the creation of Yugoslavia.... The Serbs in their history have never conquered or exploited others. Through the two world wars, they liberated themselves, and when they could, helped others to liberate themselves".

The theme of alleged Serb victimization at the hands of others was at least in part a response to the economic crisis of the 1980s, suggesting that the burden of austerity should fall mostly on the other republics, but the most powerful consequence was that for the first time since 1945 a historical narrative had been aired which portrayed the Serbs as a uniquely and innately virtuous and honourable people who were the perpetual victims of others. The British historian Richard Crampton has written that the real significance of the memo was, that it openly stated for the first time, what many ordinary Serbian people had been thinking, and, because of the intellectual prestige of its authors, it conferred a sort of pseudo-scientific legitimacy on the widespread feelings, that the Serbs were being unjustly singled out by the policies of economic austerity. At a time of widespread economic pain and suffering, the message of the memo that the Serbs were being unjustly forced to suffer more than they should become popular. The message of the memo, that the solution to the economic crisis of the 1980s was for Serbs to aggressively reassert their interests in Yugoslavia, abolish the autonomy of Kosovo and Vojvodina, and bring the prečani Serbs of Croatia and Bosnia into Serbia, led to much alarm elsewhere in Yugoslavia, where the memo was perceived as a call for Serbian domination.

We were portrayed as wanting to tear down the country. On the contrary, the Memorandum was a document which tried to stop the breakup. When the Memorandum controversy broke out, we were applauded in the West. Afterwards, it was interpreted as an anti-communist document, as a breach for some new democratic state. The country's official politics attacked us. In The Hague, the Memorandum was pulled out again. Of course, they now need another variant. That's the vortex of daily politics.

— Dejan Medaković, co-author of the Memorandum and President of SANU 1999–2003

The Austrian scholar Doris Gödl has claimed that the memo's portrayal of Serbs as perpetual victims strongly suggested that they could do no wrong and everything that had gone wrong in Yugoslavia was the work of others. Gödl wrote that though the memo was true in the sense that the Serbs at times had indeed been victimized, the picture of history presented in the memo of continuous Serb victimization from the times of the Ottoman Empire to the present was extremely one-sided and distorted, ignoring the fact that the Serbs at times had victimized the other peoples of Yugoslavia. Gödl concluded that this version of history, which portrayed the other peoples of Yugoslavia, especially the Croats, as perpetual aggressors and the Serbs as constant victims, did much to fuel the nationalism that Slobodan Milošević tapped into starting in 1987.

== Reception ==
The memo was denounced by the League of Communists of Yugoslavia, including Slobodan Milošević, the future president of Serbia, who publicly called the memo "nothing else but the darkest nationalism", and Radovan Karadžić, the future leader of Serbs in Bosnia, who stated "Bolshevism is bad, but nationalism is even worse". Despite these declarations, Milošević, Karadžić, and other Serb politicians secretly agreed with most of the memo and would form close political connections with the writers of the memo, such as Mihailo Marković, who became the vice-president of the Socialist Party of Serbia, and Dobrica Ćosić, who was appointed president of the Federal Republic of Yugoslavia in 1992. Starting in 1987, Milošević, the leader of the Serbian Communist Party, started to appeal to Serbian nationalism. Some have argued that this appeal was made to distract public attention from the extent of massive corruption within the Communist Party, but that it nonetheless sparked fears in the other republics that Milošević aspired for Serb domination across all of Yugoslavia. These fears were further fuelled by Milošević's decision to end the autonomy of Kosovo in 1989 and his deployment of ethnic Serbian policemen to violently crush protests by Kosovar Albanians - with some arguing that these decisions were responsible for the rise of secessionist feelings in the other republics. Within the other republics, it was noted that the SANU memo called for ending Kosovo's autonomy, and when that was done in 1989, it caused fears that Milošević would carry out the other parts of the memo, though it is not clear if that was his intention at the time.

The Memorandum was never the official document of the Academy. It was written by several academics, but that document does not belong to the Academy, because it was never adopted by any of our organs. What hurt me was that the attack on Serbia was led through the attack on the Academy. That text did not contain anything rotten in it or anything which could harm Serbia.

— Nikola Hajdin, President of SANU 2003-2015

Gödl wrote that by 1989, a version of history similar to the one presented in the SANU memo was being preached in Croatia, albeit with the Croats portrayed as perpetual victims and the Serbs as perpetual aggressors. Especially popular in this regard was the 1990 book The Drina River Martyrs written by an ultranationalist Bosnian Croat Roman Catholic priest, Father Anto Baković, which portrays both the Chetnik and Partisan movements in World War II as extremely anti-Croat and anti-Catholic, and the history of Yugoslavia as one of continuous violent trauma inflicted by the Serbs against the Croats. Father Baković used what are now known within Catholic circles as the Blessed Martyrs of Drina, a group of Bosnian Croat nuns who were victimized by the Chetniks in December 1941, as exemplary of the "martyrdom" of the Croats in World War II. Gödl wrote the popularity of books like The Drina River Martyrs were partly a response to the SANU memorandum and other similar Serb nationalist works, which, by emphasizing crimes committed in the immediate post-World War II era by the Partisans, was meant to erase the memory of Ustashe crimes which played a central role in the Serbian collective memory of the past. Gödl contended that, by 1989, many Serbs and Croats were both caught up in historical narratives that portrayed their own group as innately pure and virtuous and the other as innately vicious and cruel, seeing themselves as perpetual victims and the other as perpetual victimizers. Gödl claimed that it was the popularity among Croats and Serbs of these narratives of perpetual victimization in the 1980s that portended the violent break-up of Yugoslavia in 1991–1992.

According to historian Sima Ćirković, the SANU memorandum should be considered to be "a so called Memorandum" because it was never adopted by the academy, and he claims that calling the document a "memorandum" per se is a manipulation.

== Memorandum points ==
- Albanians are committing genocide against Serbs in Kosovo (pgs. 41, 56 of memorandum)
- SR Slovenia and SR Croatia are taking control of the Serbian economy. Yugoslavia is taking industry out of SR Serbia (pg. 42)
- There is need for constitutional changes of Yugoslavia because of its unfair mistreating and weakening of Serbia (pg. 46)
- Anti-Serb discrimination is rampant (pg. 50)
- Serbia sacrificed 2.5 million of its citizens in the name of Yugoslavia (in World War I and World War II) and now is a victim of this state (pg. 52)
- Between 1690 and 1912, 500,000 Serbs left Kosovo, where Albanians are committing genocide (pg. 56)
- Serbs living in Kosovo and Serbs living in Croatia are subjected to discrimination (pg. 58)
- Croatian Serbs are in unprecedented danger (pg. 62)
- All ethnic Serb writers from Bosnia and Herzegovina are Serb and not Bosnian writers (pg. 65)
- The Serbian Question cannot be resolved without the full national and cultural unity of the Serb people of Yugoslavia (pgs. 70–3)
- During the last 50 years, Serbs have twice been the victims of destruction, assimilation, forced religious conversion, cultural genocide, ideological indoctrination and saying that they do not have any importance (pgs. 70–3)
- If Yugoslavia collapses, Serbia must abide by its own national interests (pg. 73)

== Authors ==
The commission consisted of 16 Serb intellectuals:

- Pavle Ivić
- Antonije Isaković
- Dušan Kanazir
- Mihailo Marković
- Miloš Macura
- Dejan Medaković
- Miroslav Pantić
- Nikola Pantić
- Ljubiša Rakić
- Radovan Samardžić
- Miomir Vukobratović
- Vasilije Krestić
- Ivan Maksimović
- Kosta Mihailović
- Stojan Ćelić
- Nikola Čobeljić

== See also ==
- Dobrica Ćosić
- Contributions for the Slovenian National Program
- Vojko i Savle

== Sources ==
- Bokovoy, M. K.; Irvine, J.; Lilly, C. (1997). State-Society Relations in Yugoslavia, 1945-1992. Palgrave Macmillan. p. 322. ISBN 9780312126902.
- Djokić, Dejan (2003). Yugoslavism: Histories of a Failed Idea, 1918-1992. C. Hurst & Co. Publishers. pp. 255–. ISBN 978-1-85065-663-0.
- Crampton, Richard (1997). Eastern Europe in the Twentieth Century and After. London: Routledge. ISBN 0-415-16423-0.
- Gödl, Doris (Spring 2007). "Challenging the Past: Serbian and Croatian Aggressor—Victim Narratives". International Journal of Sociology. 37 (1): 43–57. doi:10.2753/IJS0020-7659370103. S2CID 143910006.
- Jović, Dejan (2009). "The "SANU Memorandum" and the reaction of the political elite (1986)". Yugoslavia: A State that Withered Away. Purdue University Press. pp. 248–253. ISBN 978-1-55753-495-8.
- Lampe, John R. (2000). Yugoslavia as History: Twice There Was a Country. Cambridge University Press. ISBN 978-0-521-77401-7.
- Mihailović, Kosta; Krestić, Vasilije (1995). Pantić, Miroslav (ed.). "Memorandum of the Serbian Academy of Sciences and Arts: Answers to criticisms" (PDF). Belgrade: SANU.
- Mihailović, Kosta; Krestić, Vasilije (1995). Pantić, Miroslav (ed.). "МЕМОРАНДУМ САНУ" ОДГОВОРИ НА КРИТИКЕ (in Serbian). Belgrade: SANU. ISBN 86-7025-213-9.
- Miller, Nick (2008). The Nonconformists: Culture, Politics, and Nationalism in a Serbian Intellectual Circle, 1944-1991. Central European University Press. p. 268. ISBN 978-963-9776-13-5.
- Silber, Laura; Little, Allan (1996) [1995]. Yugoslavia: Death of a Nation. TV Books. p. 31. ISBN 978-1-57500-005-3.
- Škorić, Sofija; Tomashevich, George Vid (1987). The Serbian Academy after a century: an institution at risk?. Serbian Heritage Academy of Canada. ISBN 978-0-920069-05-9.
- Ramet, Sabrina P. (2006). The Three Yugoslavias: State-building and Legitimation, 1918-2005. Indiana University Press. p. 321. ISBN 0-253-34656-8.
