= Dulić =

Dulić is a surname. Notable people with the surname include:

- Aleksandra Dulic (born 1973), Serbian Canadian painter
- Ivana Dulić-Marković (born 1961), Serbian politician of Croatian descent
- Modest Dulić (born 1973), Serbian politician
- Oliver Dulić (born 1975), Serbian politician
- Relja Dulić Fišer (born 1975), Serbian tennis player
- Sean Dulic (born 2005), Bosnian footballer
- Vlatko Dulić (1943–2015), Croatian actor
