= József Miskolczi =

Serbian journalist and politician

József Miskolczi (Serbian Cyrillic: Јожеф Мишколци, romanized: Jožef Miškolci; born 1951) is a former journalist and politician in Serbia from the country's Hungarian community. He served in the Assembly of Vojvodina from 1997 to 2000 as a member of the Alliance of Vojvodina Hungarians (Vajdasági Magyar Szövetség, VMSZ).

== Early life and career ==
Miskolczi was born in Subotica, in what was then the People's Republic of Serbia in the Federal People's Republic of Yugoslavia. He attended a local division of the University of Belgrade Faculty of Political Sciences, although he did not finish his degree. Miskolczi worked as a journalist for twenty years, including stints at Radio Subotica and Television Novi Sad. In 1990, he retired from journalism and founded the Funero Private Funeral Home. He has also been active in several civic organizations and was the founder of the first internet provider in Subotica.

== Politician ==
As a public figure and political journalist, Miskolczi was a member of the League of Communists of Yugoslavia (Savez komunista Jugoslavije, SKJ) when the country was a one-party socialist state. He later joined the Union of Reform Forces of Yugoslavia (Savez reformskih snaga Jugoslavije, SRSJ). Miskolczi was a founding member of the Democratic Fellowship of Vojvodina Hungarians (Vajdasági Magyarok Demokratikus Közössége, VMDK) and, after the 1994 split, joined the VMSZ. At one time, he was a member of the Subotica municipal assembly.

He was elected to the Vojvodina assembly in the 1996 provincial election, winning Subotica's seventh division as a VMSZ member, and was sworn in when the assembly met in early 1997. The election was won by the Socialist Party of Serbia (Socijalistička partija Srbije, SPS). He was not a candidate for re-election in 2000.

Miskolczi subsequently left the VMSZ. He was an independent candidate for mayor of Subotica in the 2004 Serbian local elections and finished fifth. He also appeared as the bearer of the Mogućnost electoral list in the concurrent election for the municipal assembly, although he was not himself a candidate. He generally left political life after this time, though he remained active in Hungarian civil organizations. In 2010, he remarked that various successive governments in Serbia had distrusted the country's Hungarian community, never appointing its members to leading administrative roles.

Miskolczi ran for Serbia's Hungarian National Council in 2018, appearing in the eleventh position on the "Hungarian Movement" list. The list won five mandates, and he was not elected.

== Electoral record ==
=== Municipal (Subotica) ===
2004 Municipality of Subotica local election: Mayor of Subotica
| Candidate | Party | First round | | Second round | |
| Candidate | Party | Votes | % | Votes | % |
|---|---|---|---|---|---|
| Géza Kucsera (incumbent) | Alliance of Vojvodina Hungarians | 16,667 | 31.89 | 25,018 | 50.11 |
| Oliver Dulić | Democratic Party–Boris Tadić | 8,474 | 16.21 | 24,905 | 49.89 |
| Mirko Bajić | Coalition: Subotica Our City | 6,878 | 13.16 | | |
| Radmilo Todosijević | Serbian Radical Party–Tomislav Nikolić | 5,129 | 9.81 | | |
| József Miskolczi | Citizens' Group | 3,322 | 6.36 | | |
| Blaško Gabrić | Citizens' Group: Da Subotici Svane | 3,216 | 6.15 | | |
| Tomislav Stantić | G17 Plus | 3,013 | 5.76 | | |
| Aleksandar Evetović | Strength of Serbia Movement | 1,798 | 3.44 | | |
| Čaba Šepšei | Democratic Party of Vojvodina Hungarians | 1,534 | 2.93 | | |
| Edit Stevanović | Coalition: "Together for Vojvodina–Nenad Čanak" | 1,192 | 2.28 | | |
| Srećko Novaković | Democratic Party of Serbia | 1,043 | 2.00 | | |
| Total | | 52,266 | 100.00 | 49,923 | 100.00 |
| Valid votes | | 52,266 | 98.42 | 49,923 | 97.13 |
| Invalid/blank votes | | 841 | 1.58 | 1,477 | 2.87 |
| Total votes | | 53,107 | 100.00 | 51,400 | 100.00 |
| Registered voters/turnout | | 127,986 | 41.49 | 127,986 | 40.16 |
