= Tomislav Stantić =

Serbian politician

Tomislav Stantić (Serbian Cyrillic: Томислав Стантић; born 29 May 1964) is a politician, administrator, and medical doctor in Serbia from the country's Croatian national minority community. He was a member of the government of Vojvodina from 2010 to 2012 and was one of the province's four deputy prime ministers from 2011 to 2012, serving with the party G17 Plus.

== Early life and career ==
Stantić was born in Subotica, Autonomous Province of Vojvodina, in what was then the Socialist Republic of Serbia in the Socialist Federal Republic of Yugoslavia. He finished primary and secondary medical school in Subotica, graduated from the Faculty of Medicine at the University of Novi Sad in 1995, earned a master's degree from the same institution in 2001, and later received a Ph.D. from the University of Belgrade. He has been a radiology specialist for more than twenty years and established the "Diagnostic Center Subotica" in 2005.

== Politician ==
Stantić appeared in the 215th position (out of 250) on G17 Plus's electoral list in the 2003 Serbian parliamentary election. The list won thirty-four mandates, and he was not included in the party's assembly delegation. (From 2000 to 2011, all parliamentary mandates were awarded to sponsoring parties or coalitions rather than to individual candidates, and it was common practice for the mandates to be assigned out of numerical order. Stantić could have been awarded a mandate despite his list position, although in the event he was not.) He later appeared in the fifty-fourth position on the G17 Plus list for the 2004 Vojvodina provincial election. The party did not cross the electoral threshold to win any proportional mandates.

Serbia introduced the direct election of mayors in the 2004 local elections, and Stantić was the G17 Plus candidate in Subotica. He finished in seventh place; the winning candidate was Géza Kucsera of the Alliance of Vojvodina Hungarians. Stantić also received the second position on his party's list in the concurrent election for the Subotica municipal assembly; the list won four seats, and, under Serbia's local election law at the time, he was given an automatic mandate. He resigned from the assembly on 25 January 2005.

Stantić once again appeared on G17 Plus's list in the 2007 Serbian parliamentary election, receiving the 219th position. The list won nineteen seats, and, as in 2003, he was not given a mandate. G17 Plus subsequently participated in the country's coalition government, however, and Stantić was appointed as a state secretary in the Serbian ministry of health. The party continued in government after the 2008 parliamentary election, and Stantić continued to serve in the health ministry until 2010.

He was appointed to the Vojvodina provincial government as a G17 Plus representative on 15 June 2010, with responsibility for local self-government and inter-municipal cooperation. His portfolio was restructured as "inter-regional cooperation and local self government" on 5 April 2011. On 1 June 2011, he was appointed as one of the province's four deputy prime ministers while also retaining his ministerial portfolio. G17 Plus did not continue in the provincial government after the 2012 provincial election, and Stantić's term ended that year with the swearing in of the new ministry.

=== Croatian community representative ===
Stantić led his own electoral list for Serbia's Croat National Council in 2014 and was elected when the list won eight seats. The election overall was won by a rival list led by Slaven Bačić.

Stantić called for Bačić to resign in 2015, due to the latter's silence on media reports linking the president of the national council's youth wing to a neo-Nazi organization. Stantić was quoted as saying, "Fascism is not a political issue, but a civilizational one. It is certain that the majority of Croats in Serbia and Vojvodina do not support anything that has anything to do with fascism and the Ustasha movement."

In the face of ongoing divisions in the community, Stantić founded the Croatian Civic Association in February 2016. He was quoted as saying, "We had a community that was closed, I don't mean only Croatian but also other minority communities, and we saw that the best people within that community simply could not express themselves. We tried it in the Croat National Council, but it turned out to be impossible, because even for the best initiative you will always be outvoted."

He did not seek re-election to the Croat National Council in 2018. In 2020, Stantić accused Tomislav Žigmanov of misusing funds from National Council, the Institute for the Culture of Vojvodina Croats, and the journal Hrvatska Riječ. Žigmanov rejected the accusations.

== Electoral record ==
=== Municipal (Subotica) ===
2004 Municipality of Subotica local election: Mayor of Subotica
Candidate	Party	First round		Second round	
Candidate	Party	Votes	%	Votes	%
Géza Kucsera (incumbent)	Alliance of Vojvodina Hungarians	16,667	31.89	25,018	50.11
Oliver Dulić	Democratic Party–Boris Tadić	8,474	16.21	24,905	49.89
Mirko Bajić	Coalition: Subotica Our City	6,878	13.16		
Radmilo Todosijević	Serbian Radical Party–Tomislav Nikolić	5,129	9.81		
József Miskolczi	Citizens' Group	3,322	6.36		
Blaško Gabrić	Citizens' Group: Da Subotici Svane	3,216	6.15		
Tomislav Stantić	G17 Plus	3,013	5.76		
Aleksandar Evetović	Strength of Serbia Movement	1,798	3.44		
Čaba Šepšei	Democratic Party of Vojvodina Hungarians	1,534	2.93		
Edit Stevanović	Coalition: "Together for Vojvodina–Nenad Čanak"	1,192	2.28		
Srećko Novaković	Democratic Party of Serbia	1,043	2.00		
Total		52,266	100.00	49,923	100.00
Valid votes		52,266	98.42	49,923	97.13
Invalid/blank votes		841	1.58	1,477	2.87
Total votes		53,107	100.00	51,400	100.00
Registered voters/turnout		127,986	41.49	127,986	40.16
