= SPKD "Prosvjeta" Teslić =

The Serbian Cultural and Educational Society 'Prosvjeta' of Teslic
- SPKD Prosvjeta Teslić
- Abbreviation: SPKD “Prosvjeta” Teslić
- Formation: 1991
- Type: Not-for-profit
- Legal status: Active
- Purpose: Cultural development
- Headquarters: Teslic, Republika Srpska, Bosnia and Herzegovina
- Location: Teslic, Viktovci, Pribinic, Dulic, Lug Baric
- Members: 170+
- Official language: Serbian
- President of SPKD Prosvjeta: Zivko Petrovic-Kiko

Serbian Cultural and Educational Society "Grow" of Teslić (Serbian: Српско просвјетно и културно друштво "Просвјета" Теслић), known simply as SPKD "Prosvjeta" Teslić re-established in 1991 is the main carrier of cultural events in Teslic, and it gathers a large number of intellectuals, educators and youths. The society is managed by a chamber consisting of 7 members, all led by the president Zivko Petrovic-Kiko.

== Activities ==
They are known for carrying out special events in Teslic, such as: Svetosavske Joy (Svetosavske radosti), Beloved City (Voljenom gradu), Autumn Days of Culture (Jesenji dani kulture), and 'Sabor' Serbian Folk Creativity Festival (Sabor srpskog izvornog narodnog stvaralaštva). Also, Beloved City appeared as a gratitude to the Patron Saint of Teslic, and it's carried each year in the 'Branislav Nusic' Amateur Drama Theatre, where the members of the society are performing acting shows, dances, and singing. In addition, they also organise an art exhibition known for its artworks.

Also, for the past couple of years, they organize the Spiritual Academy Event (Voljenom gradu) in cooperation with St. Sava Youth Community (Sveti Sava mladih Forum).

At the same time, Autumn Days of Culture is a traditional event that SPKD Prosvjeta have been organised for fifteen years and which runs from September to December, during which there are carried out a multitude of cultural events from various fields.

Although, their biggest achievement is the Serbian Folk Creativity Festival which gathers around a big number of participants, altogether visiting the Serbian Parliament twice a year. They have organised the event for 35 times.

Nevertheless, their favourite event is Saint Sava's Sunday (Svetosavska nedelja) which has been carried out for 18 years in Teslic, and they try to enrich it and making it more interesting every year.

In addition to the traditional events, SPKD Prosvjeta is also organising every year:

- 7 art exhibitions;
- 10 folklore events;
- 5 book promotions;
- 8 sales exhibitions of books.

All these activities are made possible due to their numerous members within the society:

- 80 members in Teslic;
- 30 members in Viktovci;
- ~50 members in Pribnic and Đulić;
- 15 members within the art department.

== Cooperation ==
SPKD is known for its beautiful cooperation with the St. Sava Youth Community, the National Library `Danilo Kis` from Teslic and the 'Branislav Nusic' Amateur Drama Theater.

Also, good cooperation has been established with every primary and secondary school in Teslic, enriching kid's culture every year.

== Facilities ==
Their library is available at any time, especially for pensioners and students. It must be mentioned the fact that you must need a membership to visit it.

At the same time, their museological setting has been visited by a large number of teslicans, especially by the youth.

== Purposes ==
Beside promoting the Serbian culture, they are very keen on preserving the Cyrillic alphabet as the main alphabet used in Teslic, and they take on every opportunity of doing so.

== Members of the chamber ==
1. Borislav Predojević
2. Zarko Jovicic
3. Teso Ristić
4. Radomir Jokic
5. Vidosava Pavlović
6. Vojislav Jovananić
7. Boško Manojlovic

== Members of the committee ==
1. Aleksa Kasapović
2. Boško Mišić
3. Miodrag Marković
4. Vukman Krgović
5. Zdravko Trivunović
6. Dušanka Lukonić
7. Milorad Marković
8. Savo Knezevic
9. Nedo Kovačević
10. Bogomir Đukić
11. Vojislav Jovanić
12. Miroslav Popović
13. Zoran Vasojević
14. Radisav Ristić
15. Radomir Jokic
16. Milorad Simic
17. Brane Peulić
18. Stojan Šajinović
19. Gordana Anđelić
20. Zdravko Jelic
21. Borislav Predojev ic
22. Dusan Kuzmanovic
23. Lazo Ristić
24. Miodrag Gačić
25. Darinka Bogdanić
26. Zaga Gavric
27. Tešo Ristić
28. Zdravko Ostojic
29. Zeljko Vukovic
30. Miro Đukarić, archpriest-stavrofor
31. Slavoljub Petricevic
32. Vidosava Pavlović
33. Živko Petrović
34. Aleksandra Jotanović
35. Jovičić Žarko
36. Boško Manojlovic
37. Cedo Grbic
38. Momčilo Gotovac
39. Ljubo Pozderović
40. Mika Smiljić
41. Milica Jovic
42. Adam Bogdanić
43. Milorad Malbašić
44. Anđelija Panic
45. Mile Brkic
