= Institute of Mental Health (Belgrade) =

- Location within Belgrade

Geography
- Location: Palmotićeva 37, Belgrade, Serbia
- Coordinates: 44.81667°N 20.47111°E

Organisation
- Type: Specialist
- Affiliated university: University of Belgrade Faculty of Philosophy, University of Belgrade School of Medicine, University of Belgrade Faculty of Defectology, University of Belgrade Faculty of Pharmacy and a Higher Medical School, Belgrade
- Patron: None

Services
- Beds: 120 (2017)
- Speciality: Mental health – psychology, neurology, psychiatry

History
- Founded: 1963; 63 years ago

Links
- Website: www.imh.org.rs
- Lists: Hospitals in Serbia
- Other links: Institute of Mental Health

The Institute of Mental Health in Belgrade (Serbian: Институт за ментално здравље / Institut za mentalno zdravlje), established in 1963, is the first social-psychiatric institution in Southeast Europe. It is a tertiary care institution that specializes in the fields of psychiatry, addiction diseases, clinical psychology, epileptic medicine, clinical neurophysiology, psycho-pharmacology, psycho-therapy and mental illness. Treatment is based on the concepts of social psychiatry with the goal of rehabilitation and re-socialization of patients. The Institute serves as a teaching facility for the Belgrade Medical School and several other schools in Belgrade.

On 18 November 2009, the Institute of Mental Health received a nomination to be inducted into the WHO Collaborative Centre for Mental Health Care by Serbian Minister of Health, Tomica Milosavljević. This nomination was approved by WHO. Belgrade's Institute of Mental Health also publishes pertinent articles on behalf of the World Health Organization.

The Director of Institute is Sc.D. Dušica Lečić Toševski. The Assistant Director is Doctor Smiljka Popović Deušić.

== History ==
Major developments in the field of psychiatry, which occurred due to the rapid development of psycho-pharmacological-therapy, opened the possibility of a specialized hospital. The Institute of Mental Health in Belgrade was founded by Sc.D. Slavka Morić-Petrović in cooperation with Sc.D. Dušan Petrović, Sc.D. Milan Popović, Sc.D. Miroslav Antonijević, Sc.D. Predrag Kaličanin and several other psychiatrists. Architectural design was done by Vladeta Stojaković. Following building approval, the institute's cornerstone was placed on 5 June 1960. The Institute of Mental Health was officially opened on 14 April 1963, in the former Socialist Federal Republic of Yugoslavia.

The Institute of Mental Health in Belgrade initially provided services for the prevention and treatment of psychiatric diseases and monitoring of out-patients. On 26 December 2007, in the presence of the Serbian Minister of Health - Tomica Milosavljević, a day hospital was opened for adolescents.

== Organizational units ==
The Institute of Mental Health includes eight departments:

- Clinic for children and adolescents
- Clinic for adults
- Clinic for addiction diseases
- Epilepsies and clinical neurophysiology sector
- Medical genetic sector
- Pharmacy service and laboratory diagnosis
- Service for scientific research and educational activities
- Department of non-medical businesses.

== Activity of the Institute ==
Today, The Institute of Mental Health in Belgrade's activity is defined by its statute, which is in compliance with the law on health care in Serbia.

For the convenience of the population of Belgrade, the institute also provides secondary health care services in addition to mental health services.

IMH Belgrade also has an educational and scientific research program. The research department started an international project that uses research into genetic copy variations that are used in determining potential risks for mental illness.

In performing a health practice IMH Belgrade provides preventative, diagnostic, therapeutic and rehabilitation services from the following fields:

- psychiatry
- neuropsychiatry
- child psychiatry
- addiction diseases
- clinical neuro-physiology
- clinical psycho-pharmacology
- psycho-therapy
- clinical psychology
- medical biochemistry
- medical supply, and
- clinical pharmacology

Endeavours of The Institute of Mental Health in Belgrade also include the education of professionals involved in the care of patients. They include psychiatrists, GPs, psychologists, pedagogues, special teachers, social workers, lawyers and medical technicians.

== See also ==
- Healthcare in Serbia
- List of hospitals in Serbia
