= Bogdan Đuričić =

Bogdan Djuricic (31 May 1950, Ljubljana - 11 December 2008, Belgrade) was a Serbian biochemist.

His chief area of scientific research was in molecular mechanisms of programmed cell death and biochemistry of ischemia.

== Education ==
In 1974, he graduated from the Belgrade Medical School and earned his Doctorate in medicine. In 1982 he received his Ph.D. at the Belgrade Medical School.

== Teaching career ==
In 1995, he became a full professor for biochemistry at the Faculty of medicine at the University of Belgrade.

== Memberships ==
He was a member of the Serbian Academy of Sciences and Arts, Department of Medical Sciences, the Serbian Medical Society, and the Serbian Scientific Society.

== Death ==
He died suddenly on 11 December 2008 in Belgrade at age 58.
