= Géza Kucsera =

Serbian politician (born 1948)

Géza Kucsera (Serbian Cyrillic: Геза Кучера, romanized: Geza Kučera; born 20 September 1948) is a politician and community representative in Serbia. A member of the country's Hungarian national minority community, he served in the Assembly of Vojvodina from 2000 to 2004 and was the mayor of Subotica from 2003 to 2008. During his time in public life, Kucsera was a member of the Alliance of Vojvodina Hungarians (Vajdasági Magyar Szövetség, VMSZ).

He is now a member of Serbia's Hungarian National Council.

== Early life and private career ==
Kucsera was born in Dobričevo, in the municipality of Bela Crkva, Vojvodina, in what was then the People's Republic of Serbia in the Federal People's Republic of Yugoslavia. He graduated from Subotica's Teacher Training College, initially worked as a teacher, and was a school principal in Subotica from 1978 to 1992. In the latter year, he was required to return to teaching in the classroom – due, he has said, to ethnic discrimination under Slobodan Milošević's rule. He is now retired.

== Politician ==
=== Local politics ===
The VMSZ won a plurality victory in Subotica in the 1996 Serbian local elections. When the municipal government was established in early 1997, Kucsera was appointed to the executive council with responsibility for education. The VMSZ subsequently participated in the 2000 local elections as part of the Democratic Opposition of Serbia (Demokratska opozicija Srbije, DOS), a broad and ideologically diverse coalition of parties opposed to Milošević's administration. The DOS won a landslide victory in Subotica; Kucsera was elected to the municipal assembly and was then re-appointed to his prior role on council. He was promoted to chair of the executive committee in May 2002 and served in this role until May 2003, when he was appointed as president of the municipal assembly, a position that was at the time equivalent to mayor.

Serbia introduced the direct election of mayors in the 2004 local elections. Kucsera ran as the VMSZ's candidate and was narrowly elected in the second round over Oliver Dulić of the Democratic Party. He served in this role for the next four years. As mayor, he sought to decentralize the administration by introducing paid municipal secretaries in each local community.

The country subsequently abandoned direct mayoral elections, and Kucsera was not a candidate at the local level in 2008.

=== Provincial politics ===
Kucersa was elected to the Vojvodina assembly for Subotica's third division in the 2000 provincial election, which was held concurrently with the local elections. The DOS won a landslide victory, and Kucsera served as a supporter of the administration.

Vojvodina introduced a system of mixed proportional representation for the 2004 provincial election. Kucsera appeared in the thirty-fourth position on the VMSZ's electoral list; the party won six proportional seats, and he was not given a mandate. (During this period, proportional mandates were assigned to candidates on the electoral lists at the discretion of the sponsoring parties or coalitions. Kucsera's specific list position had no bearing on his chances of election.) He ran in Subotica's first division in the 2008 provincial election and was defeated in the second round.

=== At the republic level ===
Kucsera received the fifty-first position on the VMSZ's list in the 2007 Serbian parliamentary election. The list won three seats, and he did not receive a mandate. (As at the provincial level, parliamentary mandates were awarded in this period to sponsoring parties or coalitions rather than to individual candidates, and it was common practice for mandates to be assigned out of numerical order. Kucsera could have been chosen as part of his party's assembly delegation notwithstanding his list position.)

Serbia's electoral system was reformed in 2011, such that mandates were awarded in numerical order for candidates on successful lists. Kucsera was given the 120th position on the VMSZ's list for the 2012 parliamentary election. This was too low a position for election to be a reasonable prospect, and he was not elected when the list won five mandates.

He was expelled from the VMSZ in 2016, against the backdrop of a significant purge within the party.

=== Hungarian National Council ===
Kucsera has also served on Serbia's Hungarian National Council at different times. He appeared in the fourth position on the "Hungarian Movement" list in the 2018 council elections and was elected when the list won five mandates. He is now a member of the council's committee on the use of languages.

== Electoral record ==
=== Provincial (Vojvodina) ===
2008 Vojvodina assembly election Subotica I (constituency seat) - First and Second Rounds
Nenad Ivanišević	"For a European Vojvodina, Democratic Party–G17 Plus, Boris Tadić"	3,020	17.11	6,281	61.45
Géza Kucsera	Hungarian Coalition–István Pásztor	3,998	22.66	3,941	38.55
Boris Bajić	People's Democratic Party of Vojvodina–Mirko Bajić	2,802	15.88		
Žarko Torbica	Serbian Radical Party	2,590	14.68		
Tibor Murenji	Together for Vojvodina–Nenad Čanak	1,619	9.17		
Blaško Gabrić	Coalition: Da Subotici Svane	1,134	6.42		
Rodoljub Đurić	Socialist Party of Serbia (SPS)–Party of United Pensioners of Serbia (PUPS)	954	5.41		
Bojan Uzelac	Democratic Party of Serbia–New Serbia–Vojislav Koštunica	601	3.41		
Klara Kodžoman Pejić	Liberal Democratic Party	506	2.87		
Zlatko Ifković	Democratic Union of Croats	422	2.39		
Total valid votes		17,646	100	10,222	100

2000 Vojvodina assembly election Subotica III (constituency seat)
Candidate	Party or Coalition	Result
Gésa Kucsera	Alliance of Vojvodina Hungarians	elected
Zoran Veljanović	Serbian Radical Party	
other candidates		

=== Municipal (Subotica) ===
2004 Municipality of Subotica local election: Mayor of Subotica
Candidate	Party	First round		Second round	
Candidate	Party	Votes	%	Votes	%
Géza Kucsera (incumbent)	Alliance of Vojvodina Hungarians	16,667	31.89	25,018	50.11
Oliver Dulić	Democratic Party–Boris Tadić	8,474	16.21	24,905	49.89
Mirko Bajić	Coalition: Subotica Our City	6,878	13.16		
Radmilo Todosijević	Serbian Radical Party–Tomislav Nikolić	5,129	9.81		
József Miskolczi	Citizens' Group	3,322	6.36		
Blaško Gabrić	Citizens' Group: Da Subotici Svane	3,216	6.15		
Tomislav Stantić	G17 Plus	3,013	5.76		
Aleksandar Evetović	Strength of Serbia Movement	1,798	3.44		
Čaba Šepšei	Democratic Party of Vojvodina Hungarians	1,534	2.93		
Edit Stevanović	Coalition: "Together for Vojvodina–Nenad Čanak"	1,192	2.28		
Srećko Novaković	Democratic Party of Serbia	1,043	2.00		
Total		52,266	100.00	49,923	100.00
Valid votes		52,266	98.42	49,923	97.13
Invalid/blank votes		841	1.58	1,477	2.87
Total votes		53,107	100.00	51,400	100.00
Registered voters/turnout		127,986	41.49	127,986	40.16
