= Milan N. Popović =

Serbian psychiatrist

Milan Popović
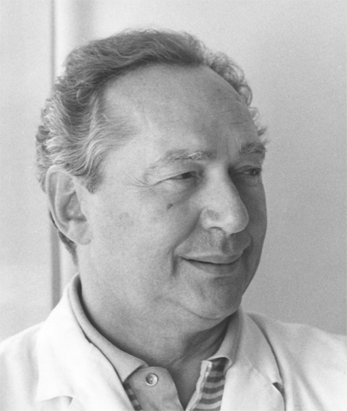
- Born: 1924; Belgrade, Kingdom of Yugoslavia (now Serbia)
- Died: 28 April 2012 (aged 87); Belgrade, Serbia
- Education: University of Belgrade School of Medicine (BS, PhD)
- Known for: Developing the group psychiatry in Serbia and opening psychiatric departments towards the society. Psychohistorical studies of Mileva Marić, Albert Einstein's wife.
- Spouse(s): Bosa Kićevac Popović (?-2012); (his death) (2 Children)
- Scientific career
- Fields: Psychiatry, psychoanalysis, group psychotherapy
- Workplaces: University of Belgrade Faculty of Philosophy; University of Belgrade School of Medicine; Institute of Mental Health (Belgrade); Centre for Rehabilitation of psychiatric patients "La Verriere" in Paris; University of California in Los Angeles; Boston University; Institute of Group Analysis in London

Milan Popović (1924–2012) was a renowned Serbian psychiatrist-psychoanalyst, a full professor of the University of Belgrade Faculty of Philosophy.

== Biography ==
He was born in 1924 in Belgrade, Serbia. He graduated from the University of Belgrade School of Medicine, specialized neuropsychiatry and was awarded a doctor's degree with the theme "Group psychotherapy of the schizophrenic in hospital conditions". He was elected associate professor of the Faculty of Philosophy of Belgrade University in 1972 and full professor in 1980.

== Education ==
Milan Popović is a pioneer in developing the group psychiatry in Serbia and opening psychiatric departments towards the society. He is a founder of "Psychoanalytical psychotherapy school" at post graduated studies of the Faculty of Medicine in Belgrade.

== Scientific and professional functions ==
He was attending professional courses from analytical psychotherapy at Tavistock Clinic in London, the Centre for mental health of 13th Arrondissement in Paris and University of California in Los Angeles, altogether for two years.

As one of the founders of the Institute of Mental Health (Belgrade), he has been leading the first Open department, mostly for psychosis since 1963. The degree of Primarius was given to him in 1968. From 1979 till he retired, he was the chief of the Centre for psychotherapy and sociotherapy, mostly doing educational and scientific activity. He has been working as a director of the Institute for mental health for a year and a half.

At the Faculty of Philosophy of Belgrade University he has been teaching Social Pathology (Sociology of mental disorders) and General psychopathology. He was the chief of sociology department, the director of the Department for philosophy and sociology, and from 1987 till 1989 the Dean of the Faculty of Philosophy of Belgrade University.

At the Faculty of Medicine of Belgrade University he was one of the organizers of postgraduate lectures from psychotherapy and social therapy. He was also the president of committee for passing the sub specialized exam from psychotherapy. He is a founder and the first leader of Psychological counseling service for students of Belgrade University.

As a visiting professor he held lectures at Centre for Rehabilitation of psychiatric patients La Verriere in Paris, University of California in Los Angeles and Boston University. In June 1990 he became Affiliate Teacher of Institute of Group Analysis in London.

He has been also working as a consultant of the Centre for victims of war trauma, affiliated department of International Red Cross and Red Crescent Federation (Serbia and Montenegro).

He has been doing medical ethics. He was the president of Ethical committee of Serbian doctors' society from 1992 till 1997. At the end of 1992 Milan Popović was elected president of the Association of Serbian physicians for peace, the branch of International association of physicians for the prevention of nuclear war. This international association was awarded the Nobel Prize for peace.

He was the president of the section for psychotherapy of Serbian medical association.

Milan Popović has showed great interests in culture too. He was also, among the rest, the President of programmed Council of Cvijeta Zuzoric art gallery. After the invitation, he has been the member of European association of culture with the seat in Venice since 1989.

== The membership in scientific institutions ==
In 1995 Milan Popović was chosen a full member of Medical academy of Serbian medical association, and in 1996 was promoted to a full member of medical department of European Academy of Sciences and Arts with the seat in Salzburg.

He is a member of honour of the Association of psychologists of Serbia and Belgrade psychoanalytical group. In 1989 he was awarded the Yugoslav Ordain of merits for people with silver rays.

== Scientific and professional work ==
He is the author of 167 scientific and professional works, of which 37 abroad, alone or with associates. Among these works there are 10 monographs, textbooks, books in which he is the only one or the first author, and from the fields of psychotherapy and social psychotherapy. We have abstracted the most important works:

- After Earthquake, Popović M., Petrović D. (The Lancet, 1964)
- La psychotherapie de groupe des schizophrenese par l image, Popović M., Psychotherapy and Psychosomatics (Vol 29, N 1-4, 1978)
- Development of a screening method or early identification of emotional disorders with University students, Morić-Petrović S., Popović M. (Institute for mental health Belgrade, Department of Health, Education and Welfare, Washington, Monograph-Book, 1973)
- Group Psychotherapy of Schizophrenia, Popović M. (Medicinska knjiga, Belgrade-Zagreb, Book, 1975)
- Psychodynamics and Psychotherapy of Neurosis, Popović M., Jerotić V. (Four editions: 1985 Nolit, 1989 Zavod za udžbenike, 2003 Zlatousti and 2007 Ars Libri, Belgrade, Podgorica, Book)
- We and Those Different Ones, Popović M., the leader of research (Institute for social researches of the Faculty of Philosophy, Belgrade, Monograph, 1988)
- Obsessive-Compulsive and Phobic Neurosis and Their Therapy, Popović M., Milovanović D. (Lek, Ljubljana, Book, 1981)
- The Relationship between a Therapist and a Patient, Popović M., Opalić P. (Naučna knjiga, Belgrade, Book, 1992)
- The Time of Hate and Suffering, Popović M. (Medicine and War, London, 1993)
- Ethnopsychology and the Yugoslav Drama, Popović (International Physicians for the Prevention of the Nuclear War, XI World Congress, Mexico City, 1993; Gesundheitpolitik, No. 173, 5 October 1993; Mexican journal El Nacional, El Compleijo de Cain, 1 November 1993)
- The Charter about the rights of patients, one of the authors (The Centre for improvement of Law studies, Belgrade, 1999)
- The Mental State of Inhabitants of Serbia after many years of war, Popović M. (XV International World Congress of Physicians for the Prevention of Nuclear War, Paris, Notebook 63-64, 2000)
- Refuges of Milan Popović, Conversations M. Popović with M. Jevtić (Plato, Belgrade, Book, 2002)
- Euthanasia, Old Problems and New Challenges, Popović M. (Health Protection, Belgrade, No. 3, 2000)
- Freud's Contribution to Group Psychology and Group Psychotherapy, Popovic M. (ZUS, Beograd, 2010)

== Studies of Mileva Marić-Einstein ==
Milan Popović has been doing psychohistorical studies of Mileva Marić-Einstein, especially concerning her relationship with her husband Albert Einstein. This study is based on the presentation and analysis of about 70 letters and postcards which Mileva Marić, and some of them Albert Einstein too, addressed to Helena Savić (grandmother of Milan Popović), their close friend and colleague from studies in Zurich. These letters are significant for better understanding of the relationship evolution of the Einstein couple, as well as of psychology of Albert.

Related work:

- A friendship - Letters of Milena and Albert to Helena Savić, Popovic M. (Podgorica, CID, 1998)
- In Albert's Shadow, the Life and Letters of Mileva Marić, Einstein's First Wife, Popović M. (The Johns Hopkins University Press, Baltimore & London, Book, September 2003)

== Family ==
His father, Novak Popović, was an engineer of technology, and his mother, a pulmonologist Julka Popović Savić Ph.D. professor of the Faculty of Medicine of Belgrade University.

He is married to Bosa Kićevac Popović, a painter. They have two children, an art historian, Ana Popović Bodroža, expert associate of the Belgrade Heritage House and Bojan Popović, director of the Gallery of Frescoes in Belgrade.

== Death ==
Popović died in Belgrade on 28 April 2012 from natural causes.
