= Gojko Nikoliš =

Yugoslav general

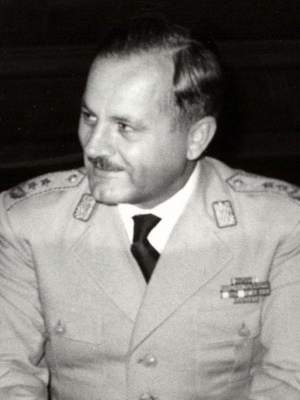
- Nikoliš in 1960

Personal details
- Born: 11 August 1911 Sjeničak Lasinjski, Austria-Hungary
- Died: 11 July 1995 (aged 83) Le Mans, France
- Spouses: Ivanka Muačević-Nikoliš; Margaret Anjou-Nikoliš
- Occupation: medical doctor, volunteer in International Brigades in Spanish Civil War, partisan general, writer, People's Hero of Yugoslavia, academic

Military service
- Rank: Colonel General

Gojko Nikoliš (Serbian Cyrillic: Гојко Николиш; 11 August 1911 – 11 July 1995) was a physician, historian and a participant in the Spanish Civil War and World War II in Yugoslavia.

He was the first Head of the Partisan Medical Corps, Colonel General of the JNA, a member of the Serbian Academy of Sciences and Arts and was awarded the Order of the People's Hero.

In 1987, he was mentioned in the so-called Vojko i Savle affair.

== Works ==
- "Development of the medical service in our army", Belgrade, 1947.
- "Sava Mrkalj - history of a single victim", "Prosvjeta", Zagreb, 1980.
- "Root, tree, pavement", "Liber" Zagreb, "Prosveta", Belgrade, 1981.
- "Records Under Pressure", Belgrade, 1988.
