= István Ispánovics =

Serbian politician (1939-2011)

István Ispánovics (Serbian Cyrillic: Иштван Ишпанович, romanized: Ištvan Išpanovič; 2 September 1939–13 April 2011) was a Serbian politician from the country's Hungarian community. He was the mayor of Subotica from 2001 to 2003, served in the Serbian parliament from 1997 to 2007, and was also a member of the Vojvodina provincial assembly. Ispánovics was at different times a member of the Democratic Fellowship of Vojvodina Hungarians (VMDK), the Alliance of Vojvodina Hungarians (VMSZ), and G17 Plus.

== Early life and career ==
Ispánovics was born in Padej, a predominantly Hungarian village in what was then the municipality of Novi Kneževac in the Danube Banovina of the Kingdom of Yugoslavia. After World War II, the village became part of the newly created municipality of Čoka in the Autonomous Province of Vojvodina, People's Republic of Serbia, Federal People's Republic of Yugoslavia.

Ispánovics graduated from the University of Belgrade Faculty of Law and worked as a lawyer in private life.

== Politician ==
=== Early years (1990–97) ===
Ispánovics joined the Democratic Fellowship of Vojvodina Hungarians on its formation in 1990. Although Serbia nominally returned to multiparty democracy in that year, its political culture over the next decade was dominated by the authoritarian rule of Socialist Party of Serbia (SPS) leader Slobodan Milošević and his allies.

Ispánovics was elected to the Subotica city assembly in the May 1992 Serbian local elections. Most of Serbia's leading opposition parties boycotted these elections on the grounds that they were neither free nor fair; the VMDK chose to participate in order to prevent the SPS from winning by default in predominantly Hungarian areas. The VMDK ultimately won the Subotica city election and afterward formed a coalition government with the Democratic Alliance of Croats in Vojvodina (DSHV), making the city one of the few jurisdictions governed by parties opposed to Milošević's rule. Ispánovics served in the assembly as a supporter of the local administration.

Due to ongoing doubts about the legitimacy of the May 1992 elections, the Serbian government held new local elections in December 1992. Ispánovics was re-elected to the Subotica city assembly as the VMDK–DSHV alliance won an increased victory overall.

Ispánovics appeared in the twentieth position (out of twenty-eight) on the VMDK's electoral list for the Zrenjanin division in the 1993 Serbian parliamentary election. The party won five seats in the division, and he was not chosen for a mandate. (From 1992 to 2000, Serbia's electoral law stipulated that one-third of parliamentary mandates would be assigned to candidates from successful lists in numerical order, while the remaining two-thirds would be distributed amongst other candidates at the discretion of the sponsoring parties. Ispánovics could have been given a mandate despite his list position, although this did not occur.)

The Democratic Fellowship of Vojvodina Hungarians experienced a serious split in 1994, with several of its leading members forming the breakaway Alliance of Vojvodina Hungarians. Ispánovics joined the new party on its formation, ultimately serving on its presidency and as leader of its city branch in Subotica. The VMSZ quickly surpassed the VMDK as the leading Hungarian party in the city.

Although the Socialist Party experienced unprecedented defeats in several Serbian cities in the 1996 local elections, it actually improved its standing in the Subotica assembly. Ispánovics lost his seat to SPS candidate Tomislav Karadžić; the VMSZ won the city election but was forced to share power afterward with the SPS and other rival parties.

=== Parliamentarian (1997–2007) and Mayor of Subotica (2001–03) ===
Ispánovics was given the second position on the VMSZ's electoral list for Subotica in the 1997 Serbian parliamentary election and received a parliamentary mandate after the list won three seats in the division. The Socialist Party's electoral alliance won the election, and the SPS afterward formed a coalition government with the far-right Serbian Radical Party (SRS) and the Yugoslav Left (JUL). Ispánovics served with the VMSZ in opposition. From 29 December 1997 to 13 September 1999, he was a deputy speaker of the national assembly.

In early 2000, the VMSZ joined the Democratic Opposition of Serbia (DOS), a coalition of parties opposed to Milošević's continued rule. DOS candidate Vojislav Koštunica defeated Milošević in the 2000 Yugoslavian presidential election, and Milošević subsequently fell from power on 5 October 2000.

The DOS won a landslide victory in Subotica in the 2000 Serbian local elections, which took place concurrently with the Yugoslavian vote. Ispánovics was re-elected to the city assembly and once again served as a supporter of the local administration, which was dominated by the VMSZ. In addition, he was elected to the Vojvodina provincial assembly for Subotica's fifth division as a VMSZ candidate. The parties of the DOS won almost every seat in the provincial assembly; Ispánovics supported the new provincial administration and was leader of the VMSZ's assembly group.

Serbia's government fell after Milošević's defeat in the Yugoslavian election, and a new Serbian parliamentary election was called for December 2000. Serbia's electoral system was reformed prior to the vote, such that the entire country became a single electoral division and all assembly mandates were assigned to candidates on successful lists at the discretion of the sponsoring parties or coalitions, irrespective of numerical order. Ispánovics was given the fortieth position on the DOS's electoral list. The list won a landslide majority victory with 176 out of 250 mandates, and he was included in the VMSZ's delegation when the new assembly convened in January 2001. In his second parliamentary term, he was a member of the legislative committee and the committee on the judiciary and administration, as well as serving on commissions for drafting the new Serbian constitution and the Basic Law of Vojvodina.

Subotica's longtime mayor József Kasza was appointed as a deputy prime minister of Serbia in early 2001. When he stood down as mayor on 8 February of that year, Ispánovics was chosen as his successor. During Ispánovic's mandate, Subotica established the foundations for new municipal offices, including a city ombudsman and city manager, as well as a council on interethnic relations. Ispánovics also took credit for working to ensure transparency in the city's spending practices. He resigned as mayor on 29 May 2003, citing health concerns, although rumours circulated at the time that the real reason had more to do with divisions in the VMSZ. In leaving office, he said, "appropriate decisions were made, but it's not my fault that they didn't come to life, I hope it will happen soon."

=== G17 Plus representative (2003–07) ===
Ispánovics left the VMSZ later in 2003 and joined G17 Plus. He appeared in the sixty-first position on the latter party's (mostly alphabetical) list in the 2003 parliamentary election and received a mandate for a third term after the list won thirty-four seats. G17 Plus joined a coalition government led by the Democratic Party of Serbia (DSS) after the election, and Ispánovics again served as a government supporter. He remained a member of the judiciary committee and also served on the committee on petitions and proposals.

Serbia's local election laws were reformed after 2000, such that all city and municipal elections in the country took place under proportional representation. Ispánovics appeared in the fourth position on G17 Plus's electoral list in Subotica for the 2004 local elections. Although the list won four seats in the city, he did not take a mandate. He also sought re-election to the provincial assembly in Subotica's fourth division in the concurrent 2004 provincial election and was defeated.

He was not a candidate in the 2007 Serbian parliamentary election, and his political career ended in that year.

== Death ==
Ispánovics died on 13 April 2011 in Kecskemét, Hungary, following a serious illness.

== Electoral record ==
=== Provincial (Vojvodina) ===
2004 Vojvodina provincial election: Subotica Division 4
Candidate	Party	First round		Second round	
Candidate	Party	Votes	%	Votes	%
Dr. Tivadar Tóth (incumbent for Subotica Division 8)	Alliance of Vojvodina Hungarians	4,965	40.94	3,785	81.21
Igor Vojnić Zelić	Strength of Serbia Movement	1,921	15.84	876	18.79
Bogdan Matković	Democratic Party of Serbia	1,887	15.56		
István Ispánovics (incumbent for Subotica Division 5)	G17 Plus	1,856	15.30		
Csaba Sepsey	Democratic Party of Vojvodina Hungarians	1,499	12.36		
Total		12,128	100.00	4,661	100.00
Valid votes		12,128	95.03	4,661	98.19
Invalid/blank votes		634	4.97	86	1.81
Total votes		12,762	100.00	4,747	100.00

2000 Vojvodina provincial election: Subotica Division 5
Candidate	Party	Votes	%
István Ispánovics	Alliance of Vojvodina Hungarians		elected
Vera Adžić	Serbian Radical Party		
other candidates			
Total			

=== Local (Subotica) ===
2000 Subotica city election: Division 33 (Újváros 2)
Candidate	Party	Votes	%
István Ispánovics	Democratic Opposition of Serbia (Affiliation: Alliance of Vojvodina Hungarians)		elected
Tibor Balog	Democratic Party of Vojvodina Hungarians		
Lívia Bíró	Citizens' Group		
Stevan Davčik	Serbian Radical Party		
Igor Galamboš	Alliance of Citizens of Subotica–Reformists of Vojvodina		
Đorđe Vukas	Socialist Party of Serbia–Yugoslav Left		
Total			
Source: All candidates except Ispánovics are listed alphabetically.

1996 Subotica city election: Division 3 (Központ II, Seat 1)
Candidate	Party	First round		Second round	
Candidate	Party	Votes	%	Votes	%
Tomislav Karadžić Tole	Socialist Party of Serbia		38.20		elected in the second round
István Ispánovics (incumbent)	Alliance of Vojvodina Hungarians		26.51		defeated in the second round
Ábráham Antal	Democratic Fellowship of Vojvodina Hungarians				
Gustav Blumić	People's Radical Party				
Zoran Francišković	Yugoslav Left				
Attila Gyolai	Alliance of Citizens of Subotica				
Momčilo Stevanović	Serbian Radical Party				
Total					
Source: All candidates except Karadžić and Ispánovics are listed alphabetically.

December 1992 Subotica city election: Division 3 (Központ II, Seat 1)
Candidate	Party	Votes	%
István Ispánovics (incumbent)	Democratic Fellowship of Vojvodina Hungarians		elected in the second round
Gustav Blumić	Democratic Movement of Serbia–Reform Democratic Party of Vojvodina–Democratic Party– Civic Movement for Subotica – Doves of Subotica–League of Social Democrats of Vojvodina		
Momčilo Soković	Party of Yugoslavs–Bunjevac-Šokac Party		
Vasilije Stojaković	Serbian Radical Party		
Total			
Source: All candidates except Ispánovics are listed alphabetically.

May 1992 Subotica city election: Division 23 (Központ II, Seat 1)
Candidate	Party	Votes	%
István Ispánovics	Democratic Fellowship of Vojvodina Hungarians		elected in the first round
Gustav Blumić	Citizens' Group		
Total			
