= Institute of Mental Health =

Institute of Mental Health may refer to:

Hospitals and research facilities:

- Institute of Mental Health, Amritsar, an institution in Amritsar, Punjab, India
- Institute of Mental Health (Erragadda), an institution in Hyderabad, Telangana, India
- Institute of Mental Health (Singapore), an institution in Hougang, Singapore
- Institute of Mental Health (Belgrade), an institution in Belgrade, Serbia
- National Institute of Mental Health, a research facility in the United States
