= Tibor Árokszállási =

Serbian politician

Tibor Árokszállási (Serbian Cyrillic: Тибор Ароксалаши, romanized: Tibor Aroksalaši; 1952–c. 16 April 2018) was a Serbian politician who served in the Vojvodina provincial assembly from 2004 to 2012. Árokszállási was a member of the far-right Serbian Radical Party (SRS).

== Private career ==
Árokszállási was a driver. He lived in Subotica.

== Politician ==
Árokszállási ran for Subotica's seventh constituency seat in the 2000 Vojvodina provincial election and for the Peščara area's first seat in the Subotica city assembly in the concurrent 2000 Serbian local elections. He was defeated in both contests.

=== Provincial representative ===
Serbia's electoral laws were reformed after the fall of Slobodan Milošević in October 2000; among other changes, local elections took place under proportional representation and Vojvodina provincial elections under mixed proportional representation. Árokszállási received the eleventh position on the Radical Party's electoral list in the 2004 Vojvodina provincial election and received a mandate when the party won twenty-one proportional seats. Although the Radicals won more seats than any other party in this election, they fell well short of a majority. An alliance led by the Democratic Party (DS) formed government, and the Radicals served in opposition.

Árokszállási also appeared in the fourth position on the Radical Party's list for Subotica in the 2004 Serbian local elections, which took place concurrently with the provincial vote. The Radicals won nine seats, and he was not chosen for a mandate. (In the 2004 local elections, the first one-third of mandates were awarded to candidates on successful lists in numerical order, while the remaining two-thirds were assigned to other candidates at the discretion of the sponsoring parties. Árokszállási was not automatically elected, and he did not receive an optional mandate.)

Árokszállási appeared in the thirteenth position on the Radical Party's list in the 2008 Vojvodina provincial election and received a mandate for a second term after the list won twenty proportional seats. The For a European Vojvodina alliance led by the Democratic Party won an outright majority, and the Radicals remained in opposition.

The Radical Party contested the 2008 local election in Subotica in an alliance with the Socialist Party of Serbia (SPS), the Democratic Party of Serbia (DSS), and New Serbia (NS). Árokszállási was given the twentieth position and did not receive a mandate after the list won thirteen seats.

The Radical Party experienced a serious split later in 2008, with several of its leading members joining the more moderate Serbian Progressive Party (SNS). Árokszállási remained with the Radicals.

=== After 2012 ===
Serbia's electoral laws were changed again in 2011, such that all mandates in elections held under proportional representation were given to candidates on successful lists in numerical order.

Árokszállási appeared in the thirty-fifth position on the Radical Party's list in the 2012 Serbian local elections. Weakened by the 2008 split, the party fell to only five proportional seats, and he was not re-elected.

Vojvodina switched to a system of full proportional representation for the 2016 Vojvodina provincial election. Árokszállási appeared in the forty-seventh position on the SRS's list and was again not elected when the list won ten mandates. He also received the twenty-second position (out of twenty-three) on a coalition list of the Radicals, the DSS, and Dveri for the concurrent 2016 local election in Subotica; the list did not cross the electoral threshold to win any mandates.

== Death ==
On 16 April 2018, the Radical Party announced that Árokszállási had died.

== Electoral record ==
=== Provincial (Vojvodina) ===
2000 Vojvodina provincial election: Subotica Division 7
Candidate	Party	Votes	%
Imre Kern	Alliance of Vojvodina Hungarians		elected
Tibor Árokszállási	Serbian Radical Party		
other candidates			
Total			

=== Local (Subotica) ===
2000 Subotica city election: Division 14 (Peščara 1)
Candidate	Party	Votes	%
Tibor Balázs Piri (incumbent)	Democratic Opposition of Serbia (Affiliation: Alliance of Vojvodina Hungarians)		elected
Tibor Árokszállási	Serbian Radical Party		
Dejan Kujundžič	Citizens' Group		
Sándor Nagy	Alliance of Citizens of Subotica–Reformists of Vojvodina		
Tibor Paul	Citizens' Group		
János Seper	Democratic Party of Vojvodina Hungarians		
Total			
Source: All candidates except Balázs Piri are listed alphabetically.
