= Vojko i Savle =

1987 newspaper article

"Vojko i Savle" (English: Vojko and Savle) is the title of the defamatory article targeting Serbian communist Gojko Nikoliš that was printed during early 1987 in the state-owned Politika daily. The term also refers to the subsequent political scandal the article caused in Socialist Republic of Serbia, a constituent federal unit of SFR Yugoslavia.

Written using what on surface appears to be light humorous tone, the article viciously went after prominent Serbian communist veteran of Spanish Civil War and World War II Gojko Nikoliš by tendentiously bringing up and value judging various aspects of his career and personal life in an effort to defame him. The article also mentions another prominent intellectual Pavle Savić, however, in contrast to the strong denouncement of Nikoliš throughout the piece, Savić is only slightly ridiculed. All this was done in somewhat veiled manner as their actual names were never mentioned in the article. Both Nikoliš and Savić were prominent Serbian Academy of Sciences and Arts (SANU) members at the time.

In the years since, information came out that State Security (SDB) and political leadership of SR Serbia at the time were very much involved in creating the article and planting it in the high-circulation newspaper amid the political fallout caused by leaked SANU Memorandum excerpts that ended up in the Serbian press during September 1986. Since the immediate writer of "Vojko i Savle" was never discovered with certainty, the issue led to much speculation and accusations over the years.

The entire shady episode and the scandal it caused is today regarded as one of the most obvious examples of political elites and security apparatus using the press as a political instrument during the final years of socialist Yugoslavia.

== Background ==
At the time when the article got published, the relations between SANU and Serbian political leadership were already strained for quite some time, mostly over the controversial SANU Memorandum that was leaked to the press in September 1986. Because of the Memorandum, the political leadership of SR Serbia was under pressure from the political leaders of other Yugoslav constituent republics, mostly SR Croatia and SR Slovenia, to deliver a strong public denouncement of the controversial document.

Complicating matters even further was the simmering behind-the-scenes personal political battle between SR Serbia's top two political authorities at the time — experienced Ivan Stambolić (president of SR Serbia's presidency) and surging Slobodan Milošević (at the time president of SR Serbia's Communist League's Central Committee) – as well as their seemingly different reactions to SANU Memorandum and to growing Serbian nationalism in general. As the biggest political authority in Serbia at the time, Stambolić condemned the Memorandum immediately (meaning that such a stance became official Serbian policy), while Milošević kept silent and avoided doing the same for a long time. He was eventually pressured by Stambolić into condemning the Memorandum, and Milošević finally did it during summer 1987 in a public speech at Bela Crkva as part of memorial festivities for July 7 holiday.

In the decades since, information came out that Serbian State Security (which kept extensive files on each individual involved in public life) played an integral part in the entire "Vojko i Savle" episode by providing personal information on Nikoliš and Savić to Serbian political leadership that later ordered the piece to be written using that info. As Milošević vs. Stambolić political battle intensified throughout 1987 and eventually had its finale played out in September 1987 at the now infamous 8th Sitting of SR Serbia's Communist League, Milošević tried to get people from State Security to accuse Stambolić and his political ally Dragiša Pavlović of being behind the entire sordid episode because he wanted to show that they used the media in order to defame SANU membership. The name of the actual individual who wrote the piece never came out because none of the parties involved were willing to talk about it.

== Article ==
On Sunday, 18 January 1987, the Politika daily newspaper (under its then editor-in-chief Žika Minović) published a humorous piece (humoreska) headlined "Vojko i Savle". The article's writer was signed as "M. Šarenac", however it was soon discovered that no such person exists on Politika's staff nor did anyone by that name live in Belgrade.

Though using jovial tone, it strongly denounces the seemingly fictional retiree named "Vojko Nikolić" by maliciously discussing his personal life, specifically going after his spouse, living arrangements, financial wealth, current love life, and past romantic liaisons. Another fictional retiree named "Savle Pavić" is also mentioned in the piece, but the extent of his denouncement is not as strong. The article mainly focuses on "Vojko", decorated Yugoslav Partisan participant of the People's Liberation Struggle during World War II, implying that despite today coming off as a retiree of modest means, he in fact owns multiple lavish seaside properties along with an account in a Swiss bank. The article then turns to "Vojko"'s past diplomatic service in an unnamed southern Asian country where he married a woman named "Argo" whom he met during the long boat ride on the way there. Stopping just short of stating it explicitly, the article then implies that "Argo" is a foreign spy and that during his diplomatic service "Vojko" had a habit of losing suitcases full of papers containing important information.

Although supposedly talking about fictional characters, anyone who followed public life in Serbia at the time could easily deduce that the pseudo-satirical piece is actually referring to Academician Gojko Nikoliš who was a World War II veteran for which he received the gallantry medal of Yugoslav people's hero; he was also former Yugoslav ambassador to India during the early 1950s where he met his future wife - a Frenchwoman named Margot. Similarly, it is obvious from information provided that the character of "Savle" is SANU president Pavle Savić.

== Immediate reaction ==
=== Politika journalists ===
Joining the negative public response that "Vojko i Savle" caused, 67 Politika journalists came out with a petition calling the article's inclusion in the paper "an egregious editorial blunder" while urging editor-in-chief Minović to "reveal the name of the article's author as well as to, together with his editorial staff, take personal responsibility for allowing such an unseemly and distasteful text into the paper".

Soon after that, those Politika journalists got support from 47 more colleagues employed at other Politika AD publications.

=== Žika Minović ===
The pressure on Minović grew both from within and from the outside as the print media wrote extensively and extremely critically about the scandal. As a result, the scandal became a topic of discussion at Politika's internal Party-initiated meeting (worker meetings under the Communist Party auspices were regularly held in Yugoslav state-owned or self-managed companies). Faced with a barrage of heavy criticism at the meeting, Minović promised to publicly apologize to both Nikoliš and Savić, which was one of the meeting's conclusions.

However, instead of his apology, the next day 14 February 1987, Politika published the following text - conceptualized as an "Explanation", it read:

As part of the regularly administered analysis of the articles published in the newspaper, the staff concluded that an oversight was made in the 18 January edition by publishing the "Vojko i Savle" piece. Further leading us to such a conclusion was the large amount of critical mail from our readers as well as the well-intentioned criticism from certain public life figures, all of whom pointed out that the said piece was, much like our editorial board concluded, below the required professional level both in terms of style and content, which may have led to certain individuals being hurt by possibly recognizing themselves in the text. By providing this explanation we're at the same time distancing ourselves from those reactions to our oversight that were intent on exploiting it for political purposes as well as for an assault on Politika, its editors, and its associates.

=== Serbian Journalists' Association ===
Reacting to Minović's "Explanation", the Serbian Journalists' Association (UNS), headed by Jug Grizelj (at that time also the editor-in-chief of NIN, another one of Politika AD's publications), summoned its internal body, sud časti (court of honour), at which it concluded that Politika editorial board should carry out an internal investigation and establish specific and personal responsibility for the individuals that allowed the text to appear. Politika's board, for its part, ignored that recommendation, choosing to defer to its already published "Explanation" thus refusing to individualize the responsibility for what itself referred to as "an oversight".

=== Gojko Nikoliš ===
At this point 75-year-old Gojko Nikoliš decided to react publicly by writing an open letter to Politika's editor-in-chief Žika Minović. Minović refused to publish the letter in Politika, but in late April 1987 it appeared in weekly magazine Mladost and after that in most of the Yugoslav print media outlets. Writing in accusatory tone, Nikoliš states:

I'm addressing you directly since you're the only legal author of the infamous "Vojko i Savle" text... I feel sorry for you, doctor Minović, but your time is up, though my own is also nearing its end. I feel sorry for your decision to imprison your own conscience in a cage, for maneuvering wildly in front of your own company as well as the entire public in order to hide the real author, thereby personally taking on a heavy responsibility for the authorship of the said article. I recognize the fact that it's not easy for you right now, but I've got no one else to address but yourself....

== Investigation ==
On 4 June 1987, the Politika organization formed a commission tasked with finding out who wrote the controversial article and how it found its way into the paper. Following an investigation that lasted twenty days, the commission concluded that it is not possible to ascertain precisely who had written the text "Vojko i Savle" and how, or on whose orders, it had reached Politika. Still, the commission's final report contained a conclusion that neither the editor-in-chief Žika Minović nor his close associates had "respected elementary editorial obligations", which "in the case of the editor-in-chief meant that he allowed his newspaper to be edited from outside".

In 1988, the Communist League's City of Belgrade Committee, now under new pro-Milošević leadership following his power takeover in Serbia at the 8th Session conducted its own investigation regarding the "Vojko i Savle" scandal. The internal document written by its analytical service names top politicians Nikola Ljubičić, Dušan Čkrebić, and Petar Stambolić (together with his nephew Ivan Stambolić) as the originators of the idea to write the article, which they thought up in fall 1986 soon after the SANU Memorandum excerpts appeared in the press. The document further claims their motivation to do so was smearing SANU by defaming its prominent member Gojko Nikoliš. The document goes on to mention that after the president of Serbian presidency Stambolić accepted the idea, he got his close personal friend and political ally Dragiša Pavlović, the president of Communist League's Belgrade Committee to prepare some compromising material on Nikoliš. Pavlović got his material from Dušan Stupar, the head of city of Belgrade UDBA branch, commissioning novelist Milenko Vučetić to produce a rough draft of the text. Vučetić's text was later honed by Vidosav Stevanović and then delivered to Politika by the executive secretary for information at the Communist League's Belgrade city committee Radmilo Kljajić (also a journalist and former Politika staffer).

== Recent reaction ==
=== Žika Minović ===
In fall 2007, Žika Minović's book titled Gojko i Pavle - istorija izvesnih i neočekivanih uzroka Osme sednice (Gojko and Pavle: History of Predictable and Unpredictable Causes of the Eight Sitting) was published.

Though many expected Minović to finally disclose the name(s) of the author(s) of "Vojko i Savle" as well as to possibly fill the public in on other unknown details surrounding the scandal, the 500-page book actually contains very little concrete information and mostly concentrates on Minović's own supposed opposition to Milošević's regime. Written in general and evasive style, the book has been criticized as "Minović's unconvincing and unsuccessful attempt at distancing himself from Milošević's politics after the fact" and "being more intent on whitewashing his own biography than providing an insider account about the people behind one of the biggest political and cultural scandals of the 20th century's final decades".

=== Insajder ===
On October 2, 2008, in B92 television's Insajder programme, Dušan Stupar, chief of State Security branch for the city of Belgrade from 1984 until 1987, claimed that writer Vidosav Stevanović wrote the piece using the information on Nikoliš and Savić from the State Security provided to Serbian political leadership. Stupar went on to add that as a reward for the job well done, his political sponsors in this endeavour arranged for Stevanović to receive the NIN Prize. When contacted by the programme, Stevanović declined to appear on-camera, but issued a statement denying Stupar's claims and also announced his intention to sue Stupar for libel and defamation of character.

Though his name was mentioned numerous times before as the writer of "Vojko i Savle", this was the first time Stevanović decided to start a legal proceeding against the individual making that claim. In September 2009, the Second Municipal Court in Belgrade ruled in plaintiff Stevanović's favour, ordering defendant Stupar to pay RSD300,000 (~€3,000) in damages.

=== Ćirilica ===
During February 2011, Stupar again talked about the "Vojko i Savle" scandal - this time on Milomir Marić's Ćirilica talk show on Happy TV. Stupar reiterated that the details from Nikoliš' and Savić's personal lives were supplied by the Security Service in response to a request that came from the political circles. This time Stupar went further, revealing that it was general Nikola Ljubičić who initiated the idea for a defamatory piece on Nikoliš and Savić to be written and published in Politika. Stupar went on to add he was told this by Dragiša Pavlović and Ivan Stambolić.

== See also ==
- Role of the media in the breakup of Yugoslavia
