= Slobodan Obradov =

Serbian physician

Prof. Dr. Slobodan Obradov

Personal details
- Born: 26 November 1918 Senta, Vojvodina, Kingdom of Serbia
- Died: 17 July 2013 (aged 94) Amsterdam, The Netherlands
- Spouse: Prof. Dr. Branka Obradov
- Children: Two (Dragan i Zoran Obradov)
- Education: Faculty of Medicine, University of Belgrade
- Occupation: Hematologist, professor at the university

Slobodan Obradov (Serbian Cyrillic:Слободан Обрадов) (26 November 1918 – 17 July 2013) was a Serbian physician. In the course of his professional career he has developed the hematology specialization in former Yugoslavia and aided in world class research on the subject of blood related cancers.

== Background ==
Obradov, Slobodan, hematologist, Professor at the University of Sarajevo, born on 26 November 1918 in Senta, graduated in 1949 from the Belgrade Medical School, Serbia; finished his specialization in Internal Medicine in 1954 in Belgrade; he received habilitation in 1961 in the subject of anaemia. He perfected himself as professor at Prof. Davidson's in the Royal College Hospital in London and he served as a researcher in several European hematological centers. In 1954 he was elected assistant professor, in 1961 as professor and in 1968 as tenured professor of the medical faculty in Sarajevo. He became director of the clinic as of 1969. Dr. Obradov received his PhD in 1970 when he defended his dissertation "The changes of the peripheral blood and bone marrow with the reticuloendothelial system in diagnosing of malignant lymphogranuloma and tumors." In 1973 he became director of The Clinic for Internal Diseases, "Prof. Dr. Bogdan Zimovic" Academic Medical Center in Sarajevo. In 1980 he became director of the Clinic for Hematology; he was also Expert Professor for the World Health Organization "WHO." Dr. Obradov retired in 1985.

Slobodan Obradov published the book "Physical examination of internal medicine" (Sarajevo, 1990) along with over 100 papers in international and domestic journals. He is a member of various professional organizations; honorary member of the International Association for Hematologists; President of the International Association for Hematologists and Transfusionologist Yugoslavia (1970–1980) and President of the International Association for Hematologists and Transfusionologists in Bosnia and Hercegovina; Organizer of 4th Meeting of Yugoslav Society of Hematology and Transfusiology, in Sarajevo.

In addition he received various awards and recognitions of which the most significant: a medal of the "Order of Silver Crest" in 1961, a medal for Merit for Humanity in 1963, and a medal "Order of the Gold Crest" in 1975.

He lived with his wife, Dr. Branka Markovic, a pediatrician, in the Netherlands. They had two sons. He died in July 2013 at the age of 94.
