= Saša Vučinić (Serbian politician) =

Saša Vučinić (Serbian Cyrillic: Саша Вучинић; born 7 October 1973) is a politician in Serbia. He was a member of the Assembly of the Federal Republic of Yugoslavia from 2000 to 2003, a member of the Assembly of Serbia and Montenegro from 2003 to 2004, and the mayor of Subotica from 2008 to 2012. Vučinić is a member of the Democratic Party (Demokratska stranka, DS).

== Early life and career ==
Vučinić was born in Istok, in what was then the Socialist Autonomous Province of Kosovo in the Socialist Republic of Serbia, Socialist Federal Republic of Yugoslavia. He later moved to Subotica in Vojvodina and trained as an electrical energy technician. He co-founded the youth magazine Talas in 1998 and worked with CITY Radio and the television station Info Kanal in 1998–99.

== Politician ==
Vučinić joined the DS is 1996 and took part in the 1996–1997 protests in Serbia against electoral fraud. He became president of the DS municipal board in Subotica for the first time in 1999.

=== Federal parliamentarian ===
The Democratic Party contested the 2000 Yugoslavian parliamentary election as part of the Democratic Opposition of Serbia (Demokratska opozicija Srbije, DOS), a broad and ideologically diverse coalition of parties opposed to Slobodan Milošević's administration. Vučinić appeared in the second position on the DOS's electoral list for the Subotica division and was given a mandate when the DOS won two of the area's three seats. (For this election, half of the mandates were awarded to candidates on successful lists in numerical order, while the other half were awarded to candidates at the discretion of the sponsoring parties or coalitions. Vučinić did not receive an automatic mandate but was included in the DOS delegation all the same.) Milošević was defeated in the concurrent Yugoslavian presidential election, an event that prompted large-scale political changes in both Serbia and Yugoslavia. Vučinić served as a supporter of Yugoslavia's new administration and was a member of the assembly committee on security and defence.

The Federal Republic of Yugoslavia was reconstituted as the State Union of Serbia and Montenegro in March 2003, and the initial membership of the new federal parliament was chosen by indirect election from the republican parliaments of Serbia and Montenegro. By virtue of their standing in the Serbian parliament, the DS and aligned parties had the right to appoint thirty-seven members; Vučinić was included in his party's delegation. He was not re-appointed in 2004

=== Local politics ===
Vučinić was elected to the Subotica municipal assembly as a DOS member in the 2000 Serbian local elections. From 2002 to 2004, he was a vice-president of the assembly, a position that was at the time equivalent to deputy mayor. He received the third position on the DS's list for Subotica in the 2004 Serbian local elections and was re-elected when the list won twelve mandates. Chosen as assembly speaker after the election, he served in this role for the next four years.

Vučinić appeared in the fourth position on the DS's For a European Subotica list in the 2008 local elections. The DS's alliance won a plurality victory in the election and formed a local coalition government with the Hungarian Coalition. Vučinić was chosen as mayor July 2008 and continued in the role until 2012. Relations between the governing parties were often difficult in this time.

The DS's Choice for a Better Life list won another plurality victory with twenty out of sixty-seven mandates in the 2012 Serbian local elections. Vučinić appeared in the second position on the list and was re-elected to the local assembly; fellow party member Modest Dulić succeeded him as mayor. Following a re-alignment of the city's political forces in 2013, the DS moved into opposition.

Vučinić led the DS's For a Just Subotica list in the 2016 local elections and was re-elected when the list won seven mandates. The Serbian Progressive Party and its allies won the election, and the DS again served in opposition; Vučinić led the party's group in the assembly. He was not a candidate in the 2020 local elections, which the DS boycotted.

=== Politics and the republican and provincial levels ===
Vučinić appeared on the DS's electoral list in the 2003 Serbian parliamentary election and on the party's For a European Serbia list in the 2008 Serbian parliamentary election. He was not assigned a mandate on either occasion. (From 2000 to 2008, all parliamentary mandates were awarded to sponsoring parties or coalitions rather than to individual candidates, and it was common practice for the mandates to be distributed out of numerical order. Vučinić's list position had no specific bearing on his chances of election.)

Serbia's electoral system was reformed in 2011, such that mandates were awarded in numerical order to candidates on successful lists. Vučinić received the 124th position on the DS's Choice for a Better Life list in the 2012 Serbian parliamentary election and was not elected when the list won sixty-seven mandates.

Vučević also appeared in the forty-seventh position (out of sixty) on the DS's Choice for a Better Vojvodina list in the 2012 Vojvodina provincial election. Election from this position was a statistical impossibility, and he was not elected when the list won sixteen proportional mandates.
