= University of Belgrade Faculty of Medicine =

University faculty in Belgrade, Serbia

Coordinates: 44°47′51″N 20°27′40″E

- Медицински факултет Универзитета у Београду; Medicinski fakultet Univerziteta u Beogradu
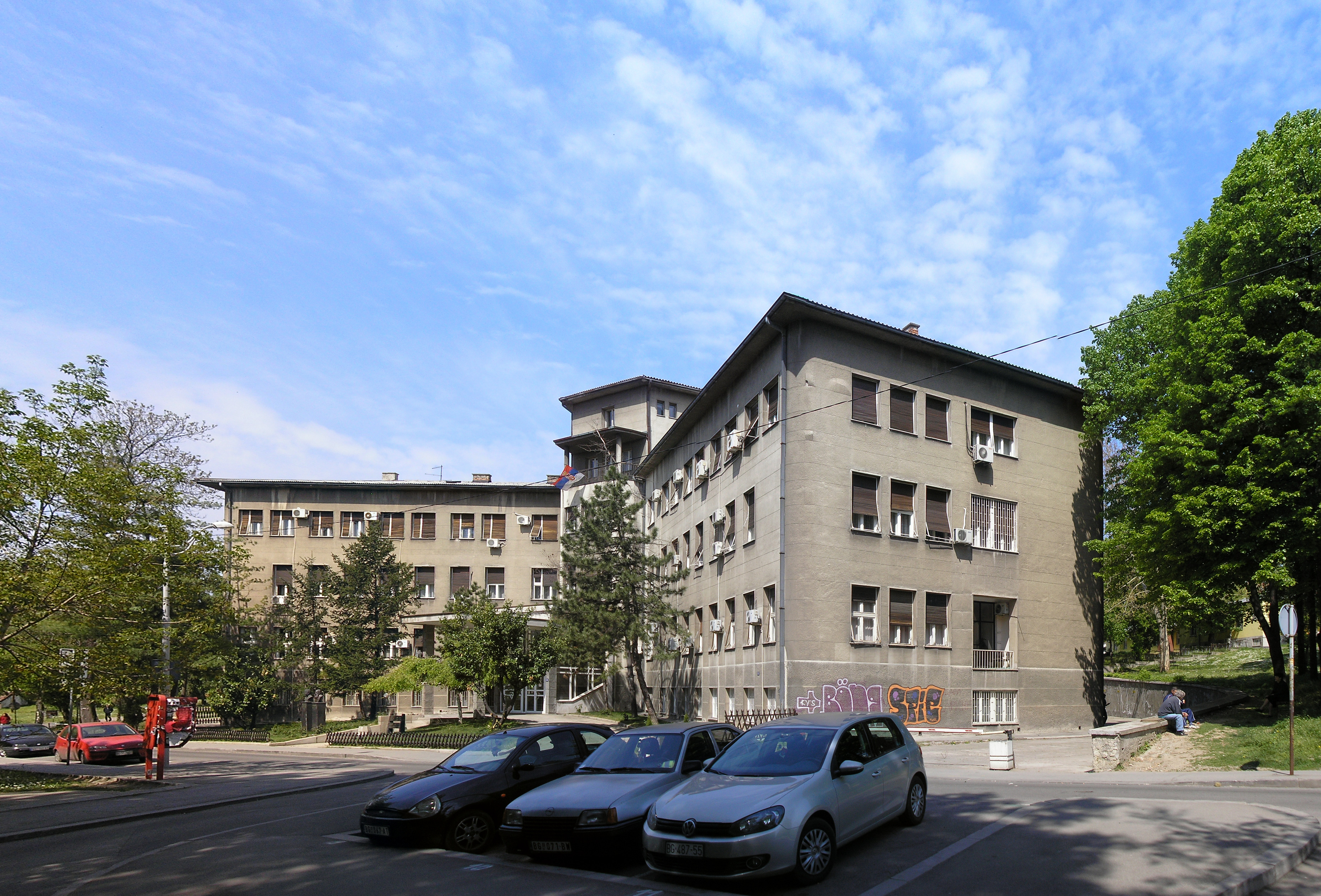
- Type: Public
- Established: 1920
- Rector: Prof. dr Vladan Đokić
- Dean: Prof. dr Milena Todorović Balint (acting)
- Faculty: 660 (2018–19)
- Students: 5,628 (2018–19)
- Undergraduates: 4,508 (2018–19)
- Postgraduates: 236 (2018–19)
- Doctoral students: 884 (2018–19)
- Location: Belgrade, Serbia
- Campus: Urban
- Website: www.mfub.bg.ac.rs

The University of Belgrade Faculty of Medicine (Serbian: Медицински факултет Универзитета у Београду, romanized: Medicinski fakultet Univerziteta u Beogradu) is a constituent institution of the University of Belgrade, which offers a wide range of academic courses in Serbian and English, including specialist practice within a network of hospitals, institutes and medical clinics. The School of Medicine includes 40 departments with over 200 professorships.

== History ==
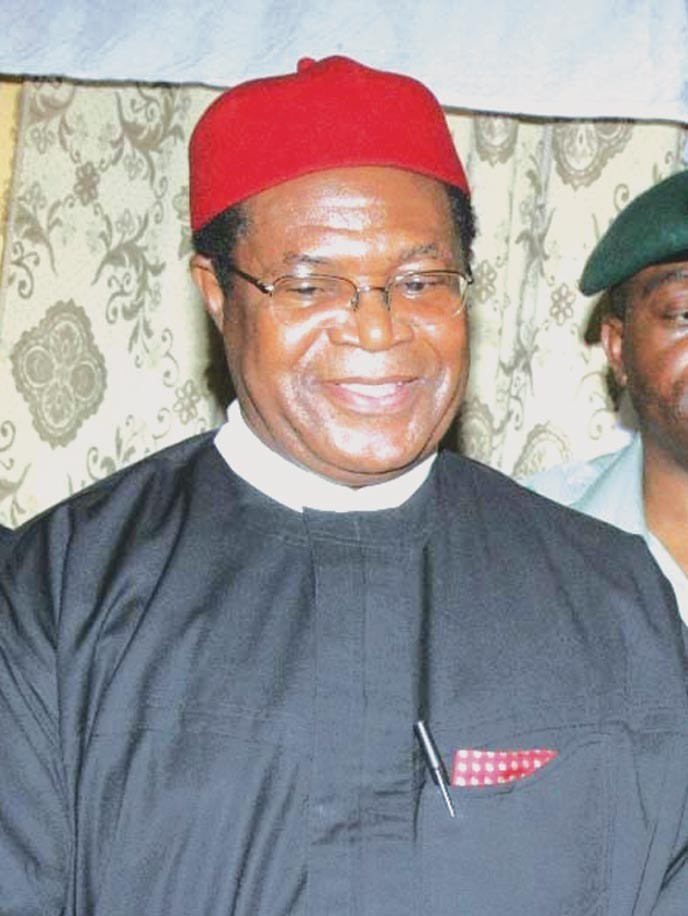
Okwesilieze Nwodo, Nigerian Governor of Enugu State, graduated from the Belgrade Medical School in 1984.

This school was established in 1920, when the first lecture was held by the anatomy professor Niko Miljanić. Since then, over 30000 have students graduated from this institution, including circa 850 international students. The studies last 12 semesters and are organized within the integral curriculum (no departments and study groups). The training is conducted at the faculty's institutes (basic subjects) and teaching bases of the faculty (clinical subjects).

== English degree programs ==
The Belgrade Medical School offers a six-year program leading to an MD degree (Doctor of Medicine) for international students. The language of instruction is English and the curriculum corresponds to the same one as the Serbian students use. The studies are conducted within the school premises as well as teaching facilities in Belgrade, such as the University Hospital Center or Institute of Mental Health.

== Notable alumni ==
Some of the school's famous students include: Svetlana Broz, Bujar Bukoshi, Živojin Bumbaširević, Bogdan Đuričić, Slavica Đukić Dejanović, Oliver Dulić, Vladeta Jerotić, Vladimir S. Kostić, Nebojša Krstić, Zlatibor Lončar, Tomica Milosavljević, Miomir Mugoša, Okwesilieze Nwodo, Slobodan Obradov, Miodrag Pavlović, Milan N. Popović, Zoran Radojičić, Ljubisav Rakić, Pasko Rakic, Ali Šukrija, Nevenka Tadić, Miodrag Radulovacki, Aleksandar Ljubić, Slobodan Uzelac and Sinisa Stanisavljevic.

== See also ==
- Clinical Centre of Serbia
