= Živojin Bumbaširević =

Serbian orthopaedic surgeon and traumatologist

Prof. D.Sc Živojin Bumbaširević MD, SANU
- Born: Живојин Бумбаширевић; 26 July 1920; Kruševac, Yugoslavia
- Died: 12 November 2008 (aged 88); Belgrade, Serbia
- Education: University of Belgrade Faculty of Medicine
- Years active: 1952-2008
- Relatives: Vladimir Bumbaširević (son); Marko Bumbaširević (son)
- Medical career
- Field: Orthopedic surgery Traumatology; Hemophilic arthropathy
- Institutions: University of Belgrade Faculty of Medicine

Živojin Bumbaširević (Serbian pronunciation: [ʒiʋǒjin buɱbaʃǐːreʋitɕ]) (26 July 1920 Kruševac – 12 November 2008 Belgrade) was a Serbian orthopedic surgeon and traumatologist.

== Biography ==
Bumbaširević was born 26 July 1920 in Kruševac, Yugoslavia into a family of Yugoslavian army officers. The family moved often and Bumbaširević attended schools in Sremska Mitrovica, Karlovac, and Prizren before graduating in 1938 and enrolling at the University of Belgrade's Faculty of Medicine. His studies were interrupted by World War II and he did not graduate until 1948. He passed his specialist exam in orthopedics in 1954 and defended his dissertation, The Value of Radiography in the Diagnosis of Hemophilic Arthropathy, in 1975 at the University of Belgrade. He started teaching orthopedic surgery and traumatology at the University of Belgrade in 1952 and was made a full professor in 1976. He also helped to establish the department of traumatology at the university.

Bumbaširević was assigned early on to rounds at an orthopedic surgery and traumatology clinic; at the time, there were no Serbian doctors specializing in orthopedic surgery and traumatology and Bumbaširević saw a gap in the literature and filled it. He served as a ward doctor, head of the ward (1956-2008), assistant director (1961-1970), and director (1971-1980) of the Clinic for Orthopedic Surgery and Traumatology. From 1969 to 1986, he oversaw the orthopedic surgery and traumatology specialist exam at the University of Belgrade and from 1967 to 1986 oversaw the specialist exam for general surgery and orthopedic surgery at the Military Medical Academy. From 1980 to 1985, he was the head of the Department of Postgraduate Studies in Orthopedics and Traumatology.

He made significant contributions to the cross sections of orthopedics, tuberculosis, and arthropathy. He made advances in spinal surgery, particularly in tuberculosis of the spine, tuberculosis of the musculoskeletal system, hemophilic arthropathy, spinal trauma, bone tumors, and rehabilitation of paraplegic patients. The SIZ of Science of the Republic of Serbia and the Fund for Scientific Research of the Serbian Academy of Sciences and Arts were among the several organizations that funded his work. During his life, Bumbaširević wrote more than 350 articles about orthopaedic surgery and traumatology and organized a scientific conference called the Malignant Bone Tumors in 1989. Bumbaširević was the "only orthopedist who was a regular member of the Serbian Academy of Sciences and Art" at the time of his induction in 1983.

Bumbaširević was a Francophile; he loved French literature and spoke French fluently. He had two sons, Vladimir and Marko, who are both doctors and members of the Serbian Academy of Sciences and Arts. Bumbaširević died on 12 November 2008 in Belgrade.

== Memberships ==
- Serbian Medical Association, 1950
- Surgical Section, Serbian Medical Association, 1951
- Association of Orthopedic Surgeons and Traumatologists of Yugoslavia, 1954
- Traffic Medicine, Serbian Medical Association, 1957
- Association of Surgeons of Yugoslavia, 1968
- International Society of Surgery, 1971
- Medical Academy, Serbian Medical Association, 1971
- Medical Union for Emergency Medicine, Orthopedic Surgery and Traumatology, 1971
- International Society of Orthopaedic Surgery and Traumatology, 1975-1985
- Academy of Medical Sciences, Serbian Medical Association, 1976
- International College of Surgeons, 1977
- French Orthopaedic Association, 1982
- Association of Traumatologists of Hungary, 1982
- Association of Traumatologists of Italy, 1983
- Serbian Academy of Sciences and Arts (SANU), 1983
- Hungarian Orthopedic Association, 1984
- Yugoslav Association of Orthopedic Surgeons and Traumatologists (honorary), 1986
- Czechoslovak Association for Orthopedical Surgery and Traumatology, 1986
- Academia medica di Roma, 1988
- Association of Medical Societies of Yugoslavia (honorary), 1990
- Italian Society of Orthopaedics and Traumatology, 1990
- Committee for the Dictionary of Serbo-Croatian Literary and Folk Language, SANU, 1991
- Committee for Monitoring the Development of Medical Science in Serbia, SANU, 1991
- Committee for Emergency Traumatology, SANU, 1991
- Crown Council of Serbia, 1992
- Society for Cultural Cooperation between France and Yugoslavia (1993)
- Committee for Language and Terminology of Medicine, SANU, 1996
- Austrian Society for Orthopaedics and Orthopaedic Surgery
- German Society for Orthopaedics and Trauma
- Committee for Serbian Language, SANU
- Council of the Center for Multidisciplinary Studies, University of Belgrade
- World Association of Orthopedic Surgeons and Traumatologists

=== Leadership ===
- Founder and President, Interdepartmental Board for Medical Terminology, Serbian Academy of Sciences and Arts (SANU)
- President, Commission of the Ethics Committee, Serbian Medical Association (SLD)
- Executive Committee, Department of Surgery, Balkan Medical Union
- President, World Congress of Orthopedic Surgeons and Traumatologists (SICOT), 1988
- President, Scientific Committee, SICOT
- Board, Department of Medical Sciences for Monitoring the Development of Medical Sciences
- Founder and Chairman, Department of Traumatology, University of Belgrade
- National Delegate of Yugoslavia, SICOT, 1975-1985
- National Delegate of Yugoslavia, Association of Orthopedic Surgeons and Traumatologists of the Mediterranean Countries and the Middle East, 1975-1982
- Editorial Board, Revue de Chirurgie Orthopédique et Réparatrice de l'Appareil Moteur
- Editorial Board, Serbian Archives of All Medicine
- Editorial Board, Beiträge zur Orthopädie und Traumatologie
- Editorial Board, Kharkiv Orthopedics and Traumatology
- Editorial Board, Acta Orthopaedica Belgica
- Editorial Board, Expert Act
- President, Board of Retired University Professors, University of Belgrade
- President, Terminology Seminar, University of Belgrade
- Founder and President, Interdepartmental Committees for Kopaonik Issues, 1996

== Awards ==
- Medal of Merit to the People, 1973
- Knight of the Legion of Honour, 1977
- Order of Labour with a Golden Wreath (1991)
- 7 July Award (1991)
- Purkiana Medal, Brno University
- Freyk Medal, Brno University
- Priorova Medal, Moscow State University's Research Institute of Traumatology and Orthopedics
- Academia medica di Roma Medal
- Diploma, International Society of Orthopaedic Surgery and Traumatology for contribution to the development of orthopedic surgery and traumatology
- Diploma, University of Belgrade Faculty of Medicine
- Diploma, School of Medicine, University of Zagreb
- Diploma, University of Niš School of Medicine
- Diploma, University of Skopje
- Diploma, University of Belgrade Faculty of Dentistry
- Diploma, Yugoslav Association of Orthopedic Surgeons and Traumatologists (JUOT)
- Gold and silver wood, JUOT
- Charter, Serbian Medical Association
- Diploma, Association of Medical Societies of Yugoslavia
- Diploma, City of Belgrade
- Knight of Grand Cross in the Order of the White Eagle
