= List of mayors of Subotica =

Mayor of Subotica
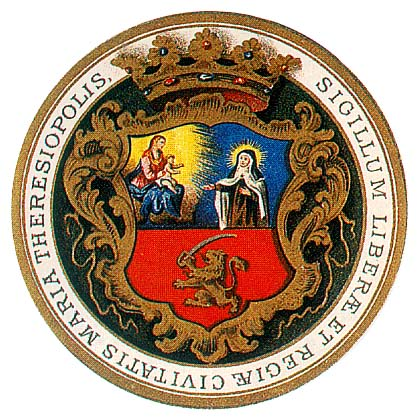
- Coat of arms of Subotica
- Incumbent; Stevan Bakić since 21 August 2020
- Style: Mayor
- Member of: City Council
- Reports to: City Assembly
- Term length: 4 years
- Inaugural holder: Janoš Sučić
- Formation: 1796

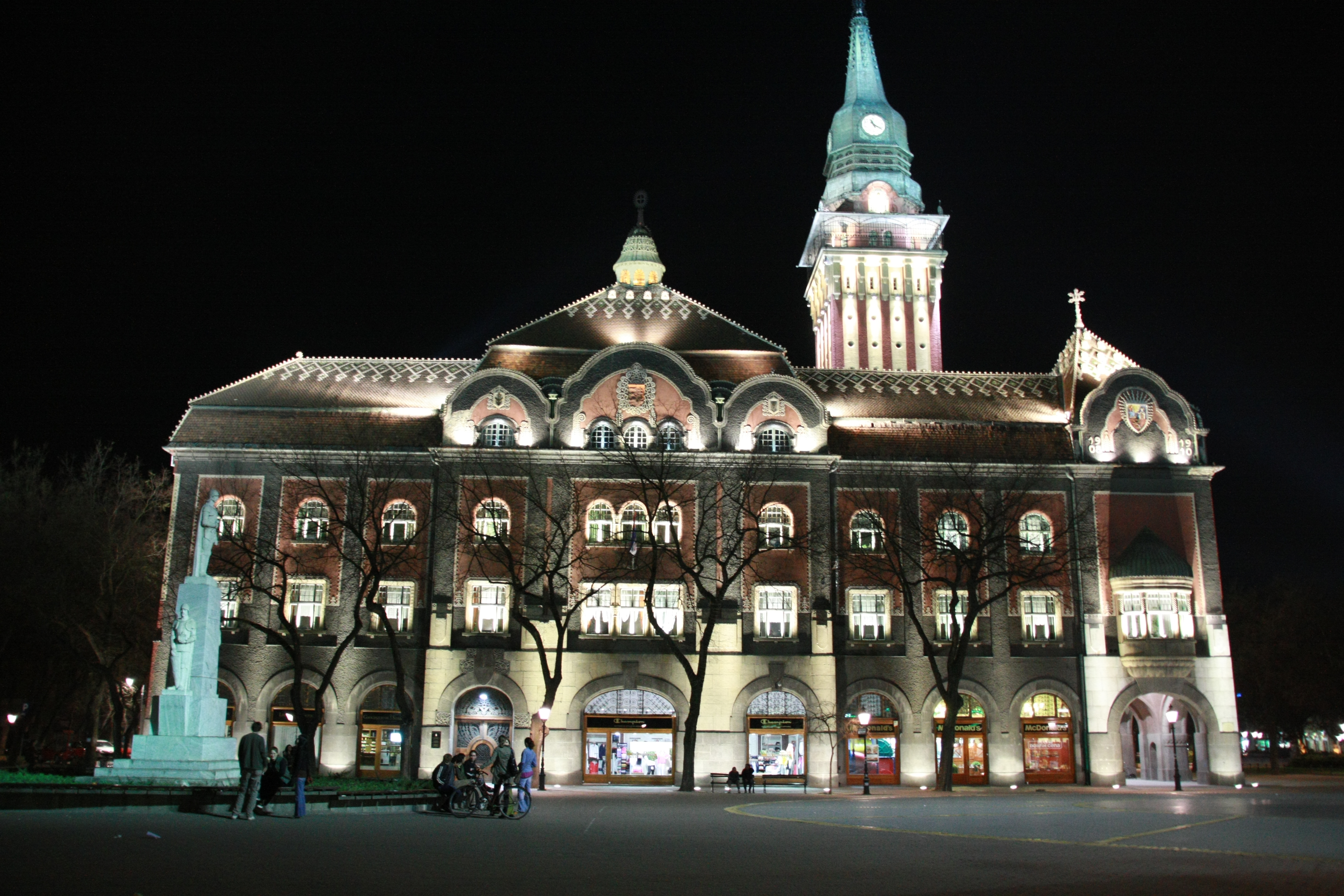
The City Hall of Subotica, built in 1912

This is a list of mayors of Subotica since 1796.

The mayor of Subotica is the head of the City of Subotica (the fifth largest city in Serbia and second largest city in the Autonomous Province of Vojvodina). He acts on behalf of the city, and performs an executive function in the City of Subotica. The current mayor of Subotica is Stevan Bakić (SNS).

== Habsburg monarchy / Austrian Empire / Austria-Hungary ==
- Janoš Sučić (János Szucsics) (1796 – 1798)
- Antal Milodanović (Antal Milodánovics) (1798 – 1800)
- Janoš Sučić (János Szucsics) (1800 – 1802)
- Jakov Sarić (1802 – 1804)
- Đerđ Kopunović (György Kopunovics) (1804 – 1809)
- Ferenc Czorda (1809 – 1813)
- Antal Milodanović (Antal Milodánovics) (1813 – 1816)
- Toma Kulunčić (1816 – 1820)
- Ferenc Czorda (1820 – 1828)
- Šimun Mukić (1828 – 1834)
- Jožef Sarić (József Szárics) (1834 – 1847)
- Ištvan Kulunčić (István Kuluncsics) (1847)
- Đerđ Vilov (György Vilov) (1847 – 1848)
- Ištvan Kulunčić (István Kuluncsics) (1848 – 1849)
- Frigyes Arnold (1849)
- Jovan Dimitrijević (1849)
- Pal Antunović (Pál Antunovics) (1849 – 1858)
- Endre Flatt (1858 – 1861)
- Janoš Mukić (János Mukics) (1861 – 1862)
- Endre Flatt (1862 – 1867)
- Máté Lénárd (1867 – 1872)
- Janoš Mukić (János Mukics) (1872 – 1884)
- Mihalj Pertić (Mihály Pertics) (1884)
- Lazar Mamužić (1884 – 1902)
- Károly Bíró (1902 – 1918)

== Kingdom of Serbs, Croats, and Slovenes / Kingdom of Yugoslavia ==
- Lukač Plesković (1918)
- Stipan Matijević (1918 – 1920)
- Vranje Sudarević (1920)
- Andrija Pletikosić (1920 – 1922)
- Nikola Tabaković (1922)
- Mirko Ivković Ivandekić (1923)
- Albe Malagurski (1924 – 1926)
- Dragoslav Đorđević (1926)
- Dragutin Stipić (1927 – 1929)
- Selimir Ostojić (1929 – 1931)
- Frano Vukić (1931 – 1933)
- Ivan Ivković Ivandekić (1933 – 1938)
- Marko Jurić (1938 – 1939)
- Ladislav Lipozenčić (1939 – 1941)

== Hungarian occupation ==
- Dezső Bitó, János Völgyi (1941 – 1943)
- Jenő Székely (1943 – 1944)

== FPR Yugoslavia / SFR Yugoslavia ==
- Lajčo Jaramazović (1944 – 1945)
- Milan Milanković (1945 – 1947)
- Alojzije Mihaljčević, Géza Tikvicki (1947 – 1948)
- Alojzije Mihaljčević, Marko Bačlija (1948 – 1952)
- Marko Horvacki (1952 – 1953)
- Vinko Lendvai (1953 – 1954)
- Miklós Kalmár (1954 – 1955)
- István Budai (1955 – 1960)
- Ivan Vuković (1960 – 1963)
- Marko Poljaković (1963 – 1965)
- Marko Poljaković, Matija Sedlak (1965 – 1968)
- Károly Bagi (1968 – 1974)
- József Dékány (1974 – 1978)
- Béla Vass (1978 – 1982)
- Stjepan Milašin (1982 – 1983)
- Janko Pejanović (1983 – 1984)
- György Szórád (1984 – 1985)
- József Palencsár (1985 – 1989)
- József Kasza (1989 – 1992)

== FR Yugoslavia / Serbia and Montenegro ==
Portrait	Name (Birth–Death)	Term of office		Party
	József Kasza (1945–2016)	1992	8 February 2001	Alliance of Vojvodina Hungarians
	István Ispánovics (1939–2011)	8 February 2001	29 May 2003	Alliance of Vojvodina Hungarians
	Géza Kucsera (born 1948)	29 May 2003	5 June 2006	Alliance of Vojvodina Hungarians

== Republic of Serbia ==
Portrait	Name (Birth–Death)	Term of office		Party
	Géza Kucsera (born 1948)	5 June 2006	10 July 2008	Alliance of Vojvodina Hungarians
	Saša Vučinić (born 1973)	10 July 2008	11 July 2012	Democratic Party
	Modest Dulić (born 1973)	11 July 2012	21 November 2013	Democratic Party
	Jenő Maglai (born 1964)	21 November 2013	23 June 2016	Alliance of Vojvodina Hungarians
	Bogdan Laban (born 1969)	23 June 2016	21 August 2020	Serbian Progressive Party
	Stevan Bakić (1967–2026)	21 August 2020	10 October 2026	Serbian Progressive Party
	Nenad Kozomora (born 1972)	5 November 2026	Incumbent	Serbian Progressive Party

== See also ==
- Subotica
