= Ljubisav Rakić =

Serbian neurobiologist (1931–2022)

Ljubisav Rakić (Serbian Cyrillic: Љубисав Ракић; 11 April 1931 – 14 October 2022) was a Serbian neurobiologist, professor and academic.

== Life and career ==
Rakić was born in Sarajevo on 11 April 1931, in Bosnia and Herzegovina. His parents were teachers. He graduated from the Belgrade Medical School in 1956. After graduating, he became an Assistant Professor for physiology and biochemistry at the University of Belgrade's School of Medicine. In 1969, he was already a Full Professor. Since 1971, he was a Professor for postgraduate studies in neurobiology at University of Belgrade. Rakić was the founder of the International brain research laboratory in Kotor where lots of famous scientists worked.

Rakić was on specialization at Brain Research Institute of the University of California in Los Angeles and at the Institute of Academician P.K. Anohin in Moscow. Between 1960 and 1980, he was a Visiting Professor of the University of California and, during the 80's, at the Baylor College of Medicine in Houston.

Rakić was a member of Department of medical sciences at the Serbian Academy of Sciences and Arts, Department of medical and biological sciences at Serbian Scientific Society, Russian Academy of Sciences, New York Academy of Sciences, Eurasian Academy of Sciences, International Organization for Brain Research and other international societies of physiologists, biochemists, neurochemists and neuropharmacologists.

Rakić's chief area of scientific research was in CNS and cancer and genetic therapy of tumors.

Rakić died in Belgrade on 14 October 2022, at the age of 91.
