= Modest Dulić =

Serbian politician

Modest Dulić (Serbian Cyrillic: Модест Дулић; born 1 October 1973) is a politician and sports administrator in Serbia. He was a member of the Government of Vojvodina from 2004 to 2012 and was the mayor of Subotica from 2012 to 2013. A member of the Democratic Party (Demokratska stranks, DS), he is the older brother of Serbian politician Oliver Dulić.

== Early life and private career ==
Dulić was born in Belgrade, in what was then the Socialist Republic of Serbia in the Socialist Federal Republic of Yugoslavia. He graduated from the University of Belgrade Faculty of Sport and Physical Education in 1998 and later worked as a teacher in Subotica.

== Politician ==
The Democratic Party contested the 2000 Serbian local elections as part of the Democratic Opposition of Serbia (Demokratska opozicija Srbije, DOS), a broad and ideologically diverse coalition of parties opposed to Slobodan Miloševic's administration. The DOS won a landslide victory in Subotica; after the election, Dulić was appointed to the municipality's executive board with responsibility for sports and youth.

The DS became the dominant party in Vojvodina's provincial government after the 2004 provincial election, and Dulić was appointed as provincial secretary (i.e., minister) for sports and youth. He continued to serve in this role after the 2008 provincial election, in which the DS and its allies won an outright majority. During Dulić's term in office, Vojvodina constructed several sports facilities and adopted the Youth Policy Action Plan. Dulić also served as president of the Wrestling Federation of Serbia, an amateur wrestling league, during this time.

Dulić appeared in the fifth position on the DS's For a European Subotica electoral list in the 2008 Serbian local elections and was given a local mandate when the list won thirty-two seats. He again appeared in the fifth position on the successor Choice for a Better Life list in the 2012 local elections and was re-elected when the list won a plurality victory with twenty seats. The DS emerged as the dominant force in the city's coalition government after the 2012 elections; Oliver Dulić was initially considered as the frontrunner for mayor, but the party ultimately chose Modest as its nominee. He was formally selected as mayor by the local assembly on 10 July 2012.

His term in office was brief. The Subotica DS had a difficult relationship in the city with its main coalition partner, the Alliance of Vojvodina Hungarians (Savez vojvođanskih Mađara, SVM), and in November 2013 a recalibration of the city's political forces led to Dulić being replaced as mayor. He returned to the city assembly after standing down from executive office. Dulić appeared in the seventh position on the DS's list in the 2016 local elections and was re-elected when the list won seven mandates. He was not a candidate in the 2020 local elections, which the DS boycotted.

Dulić also appeared in the fifty-first position (out of sixty) on the DS's Choice for a Better Vojvodina list in the 2012 Vojvodina provincial election. Election from this position was a statistical impossibility, and indeed he was not elected when the list won sixteen proportional mandates.
