= Oliver Dulić =

Serbian politician (born 1975)

- Оливер Дулић
- Dulić in 2008

Minister of Environment, Mining and Spatial Planning
- In office 14 March 2011 – 27 July 2012
- Prime Minister: Mirko Cvetković
- Preceded by: Himself; Petar Škundrić (Mining)
- Succeeded by: Velimir Ilić (Construction and Urbanism); Milan Bačević (Mining and Spatial Planning); Zorana Mihajlović (Environment)

Minister of Environment and Spatial Planning
- In office 7 July 2008 – 14 March 2011
- Prime Minister: Mirko Cvetković
- Preceded by: Saša Dragin
- Succeeded by: Himself

10th President of the National Assembly
- In office 23 May 2007 – 11 June 2008
- Preceded by: Tomislav Nikolić
- Succeeded by: Slavica Đukić Dejanović

Personal details
- Born: 21 January 1975 (age 51) Belgrade, SR Serbia, SFR Yugoslavia
- Party: Democratic Party (since 1997)
- Other political affiliations: Serbian Renewal Movement (1996–1997)
- Spouse: Andrea Kuzman
- Education: University of Belgrade
- Occupation: Politician
- Profession: Surgeon

Oliver Dulić (Serbian Cyrillic: Оливер Дулић; pronounced [ɔ̌livɛr dǔːlitɕ]; born 21 January 1975) is a Serbian politician, long-time member of Democratic Party, and former President of the National Assembly of Serbia between 2007 and 2008. He also served as Minister of Environment, Mining and Spatial Planning in the Government of Serbia.

== Biography ==
Dulić was born in Belgrade, SFR Yugoslavia and completed primary and secondary education in Subotica, and graduated from the Belgrade Medical School in 1999, where he entered postgraduate studies. He also completed the specialization on the University of Oslo. As of 2007, he was specializing in orthopaedic surgery and traumatology at the University of Belgrade. From October 2012, he is studying for his PhD at the University of Belgrade Faculty of Medicine, Banjica Institute for Orthopaedic Surgical Diseases. His scientific focus is on surgical techniques for cartilage repair, regenerative medicine and stem cells.

He entered political life in 1996, when he was one of the leaders of the students protest in Belgrade, and a member of his Initiative board, and later Otpor! movement, as well as a member of the Serbian Renewal Movement. He joined the Democratic Party in 1997. He was the president of the party's local board in Subotica for two terms. From 2000 to 2006 he was vice-president of Provincial Board of DS in Vojvodina. He is also a member of the party's Main committee. From 2001 to 2003 Dulić was head of North Bačka District. In 2003, he was an MP of the Parliament of Serbia and Montenegro. On local elections 2003, he was beaten by Géza Kucsera by just a hundred votes From 2006, he is a member of Presidency of Democratic Party.

Dulić was elected for the President of the Serbian Parliament on 23 May 2007. He was supported by 136 deputies of newly formed ruling coalition of Democratic Party, Democratic Party of Serbia and G17 Plus, as well as by votes of "Vojvodina deputies" and national minorities deputy clubs. His election ended the long-lasting institutional crisis which followed the 2007 elections. He succeeded the speaker position from Tomislav Nikolić of Serbian Radical Party, whose presidency lasted only 5 days, as a result of a strange manoeuvre within the ruling coalition through negotiations. At 32, he is the youngest speaker in the history of Serbian parliament.

=== Personal ===
Dulić is the younger brother of Modest Dulić. He is married and has a daughter. In addition to Serbian, he speaks fluent English, Norwegian, and German. He also completed music school in Subotica, and plays guitar, piano, and tamburitza. He was an active waterpolo player and played for 15 years for the Subotica Waterloo club. He owns a small private company for computer dealing in Subotica.

Coming from a mixed marriage, Dulić is of partial Serb and partial Bunjevac origin. In an interview to Croatian Nova TV, he stated that he self-identifies as Yugoslav.

== Criminal charges ==
In late 2012, Dulić was charged by Organized Crime Prosecution of Serbia with abuse of office, on suspicion that he allowed an optic cable company Nuba Invest from Slovenia, owned by Rasto Tomažič to illegally obtain financial gain. The National Assembly of Serbia voted to lift his MP immunity that protected him from arrest and prosecution. He declared it to be an attack of new Government against its political opponents. In December 2012, the Special Court rejected all accusations against Dulic.

Following the change of Democratic Party's leadership, new leader Dragan Đilas called on "all ministers in the previous government" to resign from Parliament and Dulić resigned on 30 November 2012. He was elected for the Member of Democratic Party Presidency on 2 December 2012.

An indictment against Dulić was filed in November 2014, and the Special Court delivered its first verdict in 2017, sentencing Dulić to three years and six months in prison. A year later, the Court of Appeals overturned that verdict and ordered a retrial. In the retrial conducted in 2021, the Special Court acquitted all three defendants. The prosecution filed an appeal, but in 2023 the Court of Appeals upheld the verdict.

Government offices
Preceded by Tomislav Nikolić	President of the National Assembly of Serbia; 2007–2008	Succeeded by Slavica Đukić Dejanović
Preceded by Saša Dragin	Minister of Environment and Spatial Planning; 2008–2011	Succeeded by Himself
Preceded by Oliver Dulić; Minister of Environment and Spatial Planning	Minister of Environment, Mining and Spatial Planning; 2011–2012	Succeeded by Velimir Ilić (Construction and Urbanism); Milan Bačević (Mining and Spatial Planning); Zorana Mihajlović (Environment)
