= List of SANU members =

This article shows all the members of the Serbian Academy of Sciences and Arts, since its foundation in 1886.

== Department of Mathematics, Physics and Geo Sciences ==
- Bogoljub Stanković
- Stevan Karamata
- Zoran Maksimović - Secretary of the Department of Mathematics, Physics and Geo Sciences
- Stevan Koički - Vice-President
- Zvonko Marić - Representative of the Department
- Milosav Marjanović
- Mileva Prvanović
- Olga Hadžić
- Dragoš Cvetković
- Fedor Mesinger
- Vojislav Marić
- Aleksandar Ivić
- Božidar Vujanović
- Fedor Herbut
- Nikola Konjević
- Marko Ercegovac
- Stevo Todorčević

=== Corresponding members ===
- Nikola Konjević
- Marko Ercegovac
- Zaviša Janjić
- Stevan Pilipović
- Đorde Šijački
- Vidojko Jović
- Milan Damnjanović
- Gradimir Milovanović

=== Nonresident members ===
- Nemanja Kaloper

=== Foreign members ===
- Bogdan Maglić
- Sergei Novikov
- Vilen Andreyevich Zharikov
- Tihomir Novakov
- Vasiliy Sergeyevich Vladimirov
- Yuriy Tsolakovich Oganesian
- Pantó György
- Blagovest Sendov
- William N. Everitt
- Dietrich H. Welte
- Julius Erich Wess
- André Berger
- Dionigi Galletto
- Igor Shafarevich
- Anton Zeilinger
- Endre Süli
- Milan Herak - resigned
- Vladimir Majer - resigned

== Department of Chemical and Biological Sciences ==
- Dušan Kanazir
- Milutin Stefanović
- Vojislav Petrović - Representative of the Department
- Dragomir Vitorović
- Paula Putanov - Representative in Novi Sad
- Dušan Čamprag
- Slobodan Ribnikar
- Miroslav Gašić - Secretary of the Department of Chemical and Biological Sciences
- Iván Gutman
- Dragoslav Marinković
- Živorad Čeković

=== Corresponding members ===
- Radoslav Adžić
- Živorad Čeković
- Dragan Škorić
- Marko Anđelković
- Miljenko Perić
- Nikola Tucić
- Vladimir Stevanović
- Bogdan Šolaja

=== Nonresident members ===
- Radomir Crkvenjakov
- Slobodan Macura
- Stanko Stojilković
- Nenad Kostić
- Dražen Zimonjić

=== Foreign members ===
- Seymour Cohen
- Paul M. Doty
- Dušan Hadžić
- Miha Tišler
- Drago Grdenić
- Chintamani Nagesa Ramachandra Rao
- Richard M. Spriggs
- John O'Mara Bockris
- Guy Ourisson
- Michael Simic
- Branislav Vidić
- Emil Špaldon
- Constantin E. Sekeris
- Igor Vladimirovich Torgov
- Velibor Krsmanović
- Frank E. Karas
- Francisco J. Ayala
- Stanley Prusiner
- Borislav Bogdanović
- Paul Greengard

== Department of Technical Sciences ==
- Ilija Obradović
- Nikola Hajdin - President
- Petar Miljanić - Secretary of the Department of Technical Sciences
- Jovan Surutka
- Momčilo Ristić
- Dragutin Dražić - Representative of the Department
- Dušan Milović
- Đorđe Zloković
- Miomir Vukobratović
- Vladan Đorđević
- Aleksandar Marinčić
- Ilija Stojanović
- Pantelija Nikolić
- Đorđe Đukić
- Boško Petrović
- Antonije Đorđević

=== Corresponding members ===
- Boško Petrović
- Dragutin Zelenović
- Antonije Đorđević

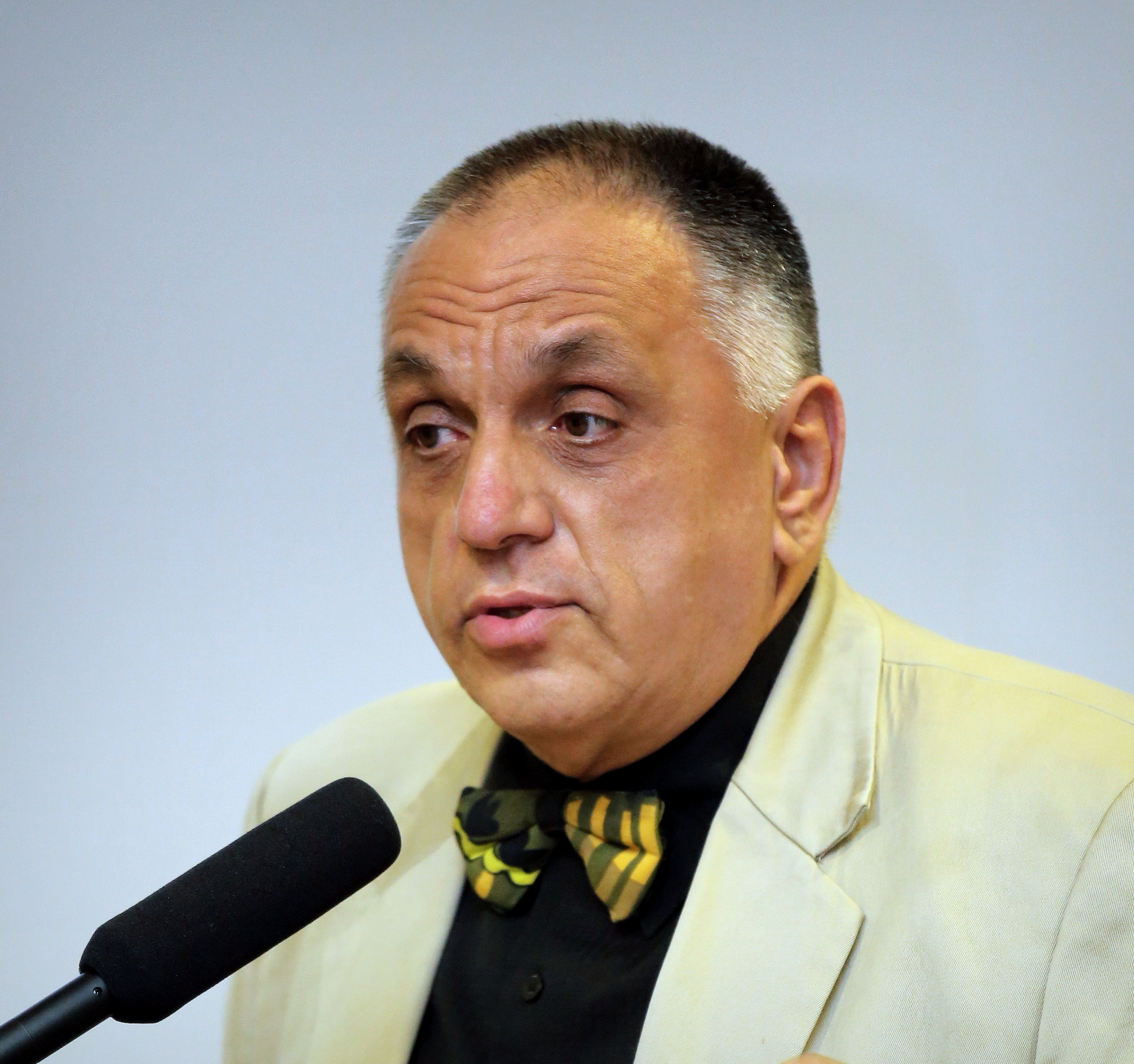
Z. Petrovic

- Zoran Lj. Petrović
- Teodor Atanacković
- Ninoslav Stojadinović
- Zoran Đurić
- Zoran Popović

=== Foreign members ===
- Dragoslav D. Šiljak
- Bruno Thürlimann
- Konstantin Vasilyevich Frolov
- Vukan R. Vuchic
- Valeriy Vladimirovich Skorohod
- Anthony N. Kounadis
- Valentin Vitalyevich Rumyancev
- Felix Leonidovich Chernoushko
- Dmitriy Yevgeniyevich Ohotsimski
- Miloš Ercegovac
- Zoran D. Popović
- Zoja Popović
- Ingo Müller
- Miroslav Krstić

== Department of Medical Sciences ==
- Ljubisav Rakić - Representative of the Department
- Zlatibor Petrović - Secretary of the Department of Medical Sciences
- Vladimir Kanjuh
- Vojin Šulović
- Miroslav Radovanović
- Zoran Kovačević - President of SASA Branch in Novi Sad
- Živojin Bumbaširević
- Sveto Suša
- Veselinka Šušić
- Vladimir Bošnjaković
- Miodrag Ostojić
- Vladimir S. Kostić
- Miroslav Simić
- Bogdan Đuričić
- Vladimir S. Kostić
- Vladimir Bumbaširević
- Ninoslav Radovanović
- Dragan Micić
- Miodrag Čolić
- Sava Perović
- Radoje Čolović
- Jovan Hadži-Đokić

=== Corresponding members ===
- Vladislav Stefanović
- Predrag Peško
- Vojislav Leković
- Nebojša Lalić
- Đorđe Radak
- Nebojša Radunović
- Dušica Lečić

=== Nonresident members ===
- Jovan Rašković
- Dragutin Vukotić
- Stojanka Aleksić
- Dragan Švrakić
- Milan Stevanović

=== Foreign members ===
- Georges Mathé
- Jean Bernard
- Paško Rakić
- Jesse E. Edwards
- Denton Cooley
- Lapis Károly
- Alexander Margulis
- Tamio Yamakawa
- Gennady Alekseyevich Buznikov
- Kassai Tibor
- Momir Polenaković
- Yevgeny Ivanovich Chazov
- Vasilios D. Thanopoulos
- Harden M. McConnell
- Berislav Zloković
- Eugenio Picano
- Hiroshi Akiyama
- Ronald Grossarth Maticek
- Felix Unger - president of the European Academy of Sciences and Arts
- Roger Gilman
- Pavlos Tutuzas
- Gaetano Thiene
- Henry N. Wagner
- Veljko Vlaisavljević
- Antonio Colombo
- Torsten Wiesel
- Miodrag Radulovački

== Department of Language and Literature ==
- Vojislav Đurić
- Dobrica Ćosić
- Erih Koš
- Miroslav Pantić
- Stevan Raičković
- Milka Ivić
- Irena Grickat-Radulović
- Miodrag Pavlović
- Dragoslav Mihailović
- Predrag Palavestra - Secretary of the Department of Language and Literature
- Matija Bećković
- Milorad Pavić
- Szeli István
- Svetozar Petrović
- Pavle Ugrinov
- Zoran Konstantinović
- Ljubomir Simović
- Nikola Milošević
- Nikša Stipčević - Representative of the Department
- Svetozar Koljević
- Vladeta Jerotić
- Aleksandar Mladenović
- Ivan Klajn
- Milosav Tešić

=== Corresponding members ===
- Dušan Kovačević
- Milosav Tešić
- Nada Milošević-Đorđević
- Aleksandar Loma
- Predrag Piper
- Milorad Radovanović
- Svetlana Velmar-Janković

=== Nonresident members ===
- Milovan Danojlić
- David Albahari

=== Foreign members ===
- Stanislaus Hafner
- Antonio Emilio Tachiaos
- Peer Jacobsen
- Reinhard Lauer
- Vladimir Nikolayevich Voynovich
- Rolf Dieter Kluge
- Jean Dutourd
- Zuzanna Topolińska
- Svetlana Mihailovna Tolstoy
- Iliya Konev
- Ronald Harwood
- Konrád György
- Aksinia Dzhurova
- Gabriella Schubert
- Vlada Urošević
- Manfred Jänichen
- Gerhard Neweklowsky

== Department of Social Sciences ==
- Mihailo Marković - Representative of the Department
- Dimitrije Stefanović - General Secretary
- Ivan Maksimović
- Kosta Mihailović
- Aleksandar Fira
- Ljubomir Tadić
- Mihailo Đurić - Secretary of the Department of Social Sciences
- Várady Tibor
- Vojislav Stanovčić

=== Corresponding members ===
- Časlav Ocić
- Danilo Basta
- Kosta Čavoški
- Aleksandar Kostić

=== Foreign members ===
- Djahangir Aly Abbas Kerimov
- Maurice Duverger
- Jürgen Habermas
- Alex N. Dragnich
- Pierre Marie Gallois
- Stanley Rosen
- Noam Chomsky
- Masayuki Iwata
- Vladimir Stipetić - resigned

== Department of Historical Sciences ==
- Dejan Medaković
- Sima Ćirković
- Slavko Gavrilović
- Vladimir Stojančević
- Vasilije Krestić - Secretary of the Department of Historical Sciences
- Vojislav Korać
- Čedomir Popov
- Milorad Ekmečić - Representative of the Department
- Desanka Kovačević-Kojić
- Nikola Tasić - Secretary-General
- Slobodan Dušanić
- Gojko Subotić
- Miloš Blagojević
- Dinko Davidov
- Branko Peruničić, scientific counsellor since 1954

=== Corresponding members ===
- Andrej Mitrović
- Jovanka Kalić
- Dinko Davidov
- Miloš Blagojević
- Momčilo Spremić
- Ljubomir Maksimović
- Borislav Jovanović
- Dragoljub Živojinović
- Mirjana Živojinović
- Ljubodrag Dimić

=== Nonresident members ===
- Dimitrije Djordjević
- Vlado Strugar
- Slobodan Ćurčić
- Zagorka Gavrilović
- Jelena Milojković-Đurić

=== Foreign members ===
- David MacKenzie
- Aleksandar Popović
- Halil İnalcık
- Charalambos Bouras
- Aleksandar Fol
- Noël Duval
- Harald Hauptmann
- Friedbert Ficker
- Cvetan Grozdanov
- Elena Guskova
- Karlheinz Deschner
- Panagiotis Vokotopoulos
- Angeliki Laiou
- Tjalling Waterbolk - resigned

== Department of Fine Arts and Music ==
- Ljubica Sokić
- Dušan Radić
- Olga Jevrić
- Mladen Srbinović - Vice-President
- Svetomir Arsić - Basara
- Dejan Despić - Secretary of the Department of Fine Arts and Music
- Radomir Reljić - Representative of the Department
- Nikola Janković

=== Corresponding members ===
- Bogdan Bogdanović
- Nikola Janković
- Vlastimir Trajković
- Dušan Otašević
- Milan Lojanica
- Todor Stevanović
- Ivan Jevtić
- Isidora Žebeljan
- Branislav Mitrović

=== Nonresident members ===
- Vladimir Veličković
- Milorad Bata Mihailović
- Dušan Džamonja
- Ljubomir-Ljuba Popović
- Petar Omčikus

=== Foreign members ===
- Boris Podrecca
- Petrovics Emil
- Tome Serafimovski
