= Stevan Filipović =

Stevan Filipović may refer to:

- Stevan Filipović (film director) (born 1981), Serbian film editor, director and lecturer
- Stjepan Filipović (1916–1942), known as Stevan Filipović in Serbia, Yugoslav communist
- Teodor Filipović (1778–1807), known as Stevan Filipović in the 1800s, Serbian writer, jurist, philosopher and educator

== See also ==
- Stevan Pilipović, professor of mathematics
- Stefan Filipović, Montenegrin pop singer
