= Radunović =

Radunović (Cyrillic script: Радуновић) is a surname derived from a masculine given name Radun. It may refer to:

- Aleksandar Radunović (born 1980), football defender
- Balša Radunović (born 1980), basketball player
- Boris Radunović (born 1996), football goalkeeper
- Nebojša Radunović (born 1954), gynecologist and professor
- Risto Radunović (born 1992), footballer
- Veselin Radunović (born 1974), football referee
- Dejan Radunović (born 2002), football referee
