= Stevan Jakovljević =

Serbian author, biologist and professor (1890–1962)

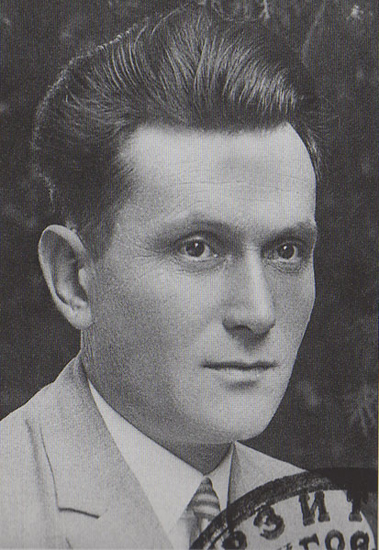
- Jakovljević c. 1926
- Born: 7 December 1890; Knjaževac, Kingdom of Serbia
- Died: 2 November 1962 (aged 71); Belgrade, FPR Yugoslavia
- Resting place: Belgrade New Cemetery
- Education: University of Belgrade Faculty of Philosophy
- Occupations: Author, biologist and professor
- Writing career
- Notable works: Likovi u senci, Srpska trilogija

Stevan Jakovljević (Serbian Cyrillic: Стеван Јаковљевић; 7 December 1890 – 2 November 1962) was a Serbian author, biologist and professor.

He is most known as the author of the novel Likovi u senci and the trilogy Srpska trilogija.

== Biography ==
Jakovljević graduated with a degree in biology from the University of Belgrade Faculty of Philosophy where he also later earned his doctorate. He was a professor at the University's Faculty of Pharmacy.

As an officer in the Royal Serbian Army, he fought in the Serbian Campaign of World War I. During World War II, he was held in Italian and German prisoner-of-war (POW) camps.

Jakovljević was a professor at the University of Belgrade and its rector from 1945 to 1950. He was also a member of the Serbian Academy of Sciences and Arts.

== Published work ==
He made a name for himself in the literary world with his trilogy of novels published in 1937 titled Srpska trilogija which consist of the novels Devetstočetrnaesta (1935), Pod Krstom (1936) and Kapija slobode (1937). His other works include the novels Smena generacija (1939) about the social life in Belgrade during the interwar period, Velika zabuna (1952) which is a war chronicle of World War II and Likovi u senci (1956) which describes life as a POW in Italy and Germany.

He also published botanical papers titled Studije o biljnom svetu Prespanskog jezera, Makrofitska vegetacija Ohridskog jezera i Sistematika lekovitog bilja.

== Personal life ==
His sister was Serbian author Milica "Mir-Jam" Jakovljević.

== Death and legacy ==
Jakovljević died on 2 November 1962 and he is interred in the Belgrade New Cemetery. The gymnasium in Vlasotince is named after him.

Academic offices
Preceded by Nikola Popović	Rector of the University of Belgrade; 1945–1950	Succeeded by Ilija Đuričić
