= Legions of Marshal Józef Piłsudski Bridge =

Vistula River overpass, Płock, Poland

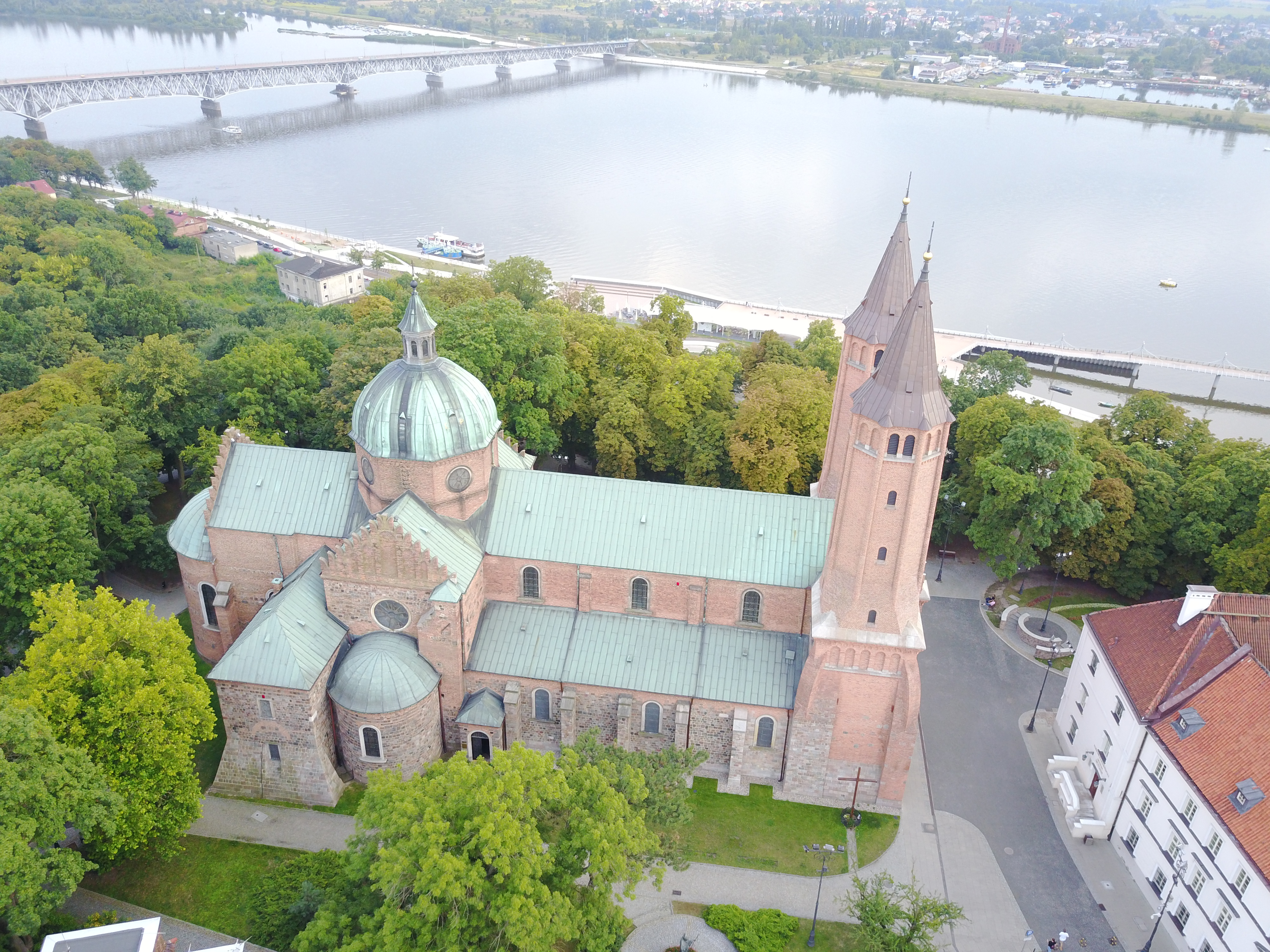
- Coordinates: 52.534655°N 19.690847°E
- Carries: 2 lanes (motor vehicles); 1 railway track line (trains); Pedestrians and cyclists
- Crosses: Vistula River
- Locale: Płock, Mazovia; Poland
- Official name: Most im. Legionów Marszałka Józefa Piłsudskiego
- Maintained by: City Road Management in Płock

Characteristics
- Design: Grille bridge
- Material: Steel
- Total length: 690.4 m (0.429 mi) (2265 ft)
- Width: 14 m (46 ft)
- Height: 30 m (98 ft)
- Longest span: 110.4 m (362 ft)
- No. of spans: 9
- Piers in water: 7
- Clearance below: 12 m (39 ft) (max. at the medium level water of the river)

History
- Designer: Eugeniusz Hildebrandt; Stanisław Lenczewski-Samotyja; Zygmunt Pieślak; Andrzej Pszenicki
- Construction start: 1936
- Construction end: 1938
- Opened: December 19, 1938

Statistics
- Toll: Free

Location
- Interactive map of Legions of Marshal Józef Piłsudski Bridge

The Legions of Marshal Józef Piłsudski Bridge (Polish: Most im. Legionów Marszałka Józefa Piłsudskiego) is a road-railway bridge over the Vistula River in Płock, Poland, connecting the Old Town and Radziwie district on a left river bank.

The bridge was constructed as part of a new railway line from Kutno to Sierpce and Brodnica needed to fill a gap in the infrastructure of the newly independent Second Polish Republic left after the period the partitions of Poland where in the russian controlled Congress Poland the occupiers limited the construction of railways on the left bank of the Vistula river for strategic reasons, and create a rail link from Lwów through Skarżysko, Łódź and Brodnica to the Baltic Sea linking the envisioned future Central Industrial Region with the port of Gdynia. Construction of the line started in 1920 and in 1922 connected Kutno to Płock's southern suburb of Radziwie, by 1934 the segment between Płock and Sierpc was opened.

A tender for the construction of the bridge was held in 1936, won two companies, "Konstanty Rudzki i Spółka" and "Przedsiębiorstwo Robót Inżynieryjnych – Leszek Muszyński", which started work on the bridge from both ends by 1937 and finished in 1938 in a record 20 months. The project faced unique engineering challenges due to the high escarpment on the right bank of the river in Płock, which was solved by having the bridge rise 8 meters from the bridgehead located on the flat left bank and each span individually designed. At 649 meters at the time of its opening it was longest bridge in Poland.On December 19, 1938 the bridge was formally christened the Bridge of the Legions of Marshal Józef Piłsudski.

Following the German invasion of Poland at the beginning of World War 2, the bridge was blown up by the retreating Polish Army in September 1939. By 1943 the bridge was restored by occupying Germans, and once again blown by them 1943, and restored in 1950. It underwent major renovation in 1979, 1994 and 2019.

In 2007 the Solidarity Bridge was built as a second road bridge in Płock forming a bypass of the city center.

The Legions of Marshal Józef Piłsudski Bridge in Płock is the longest illuminated bridge in Europe.

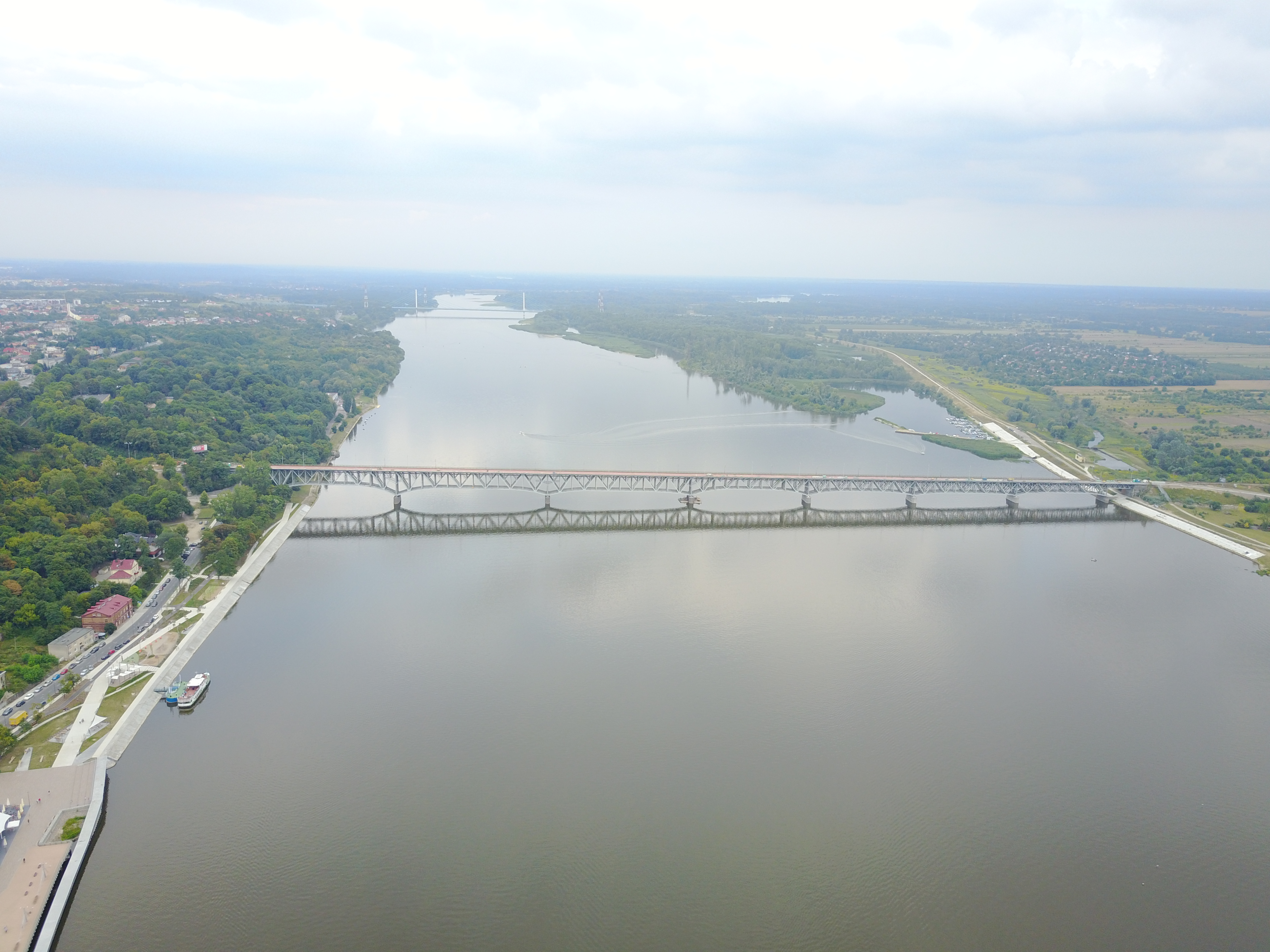

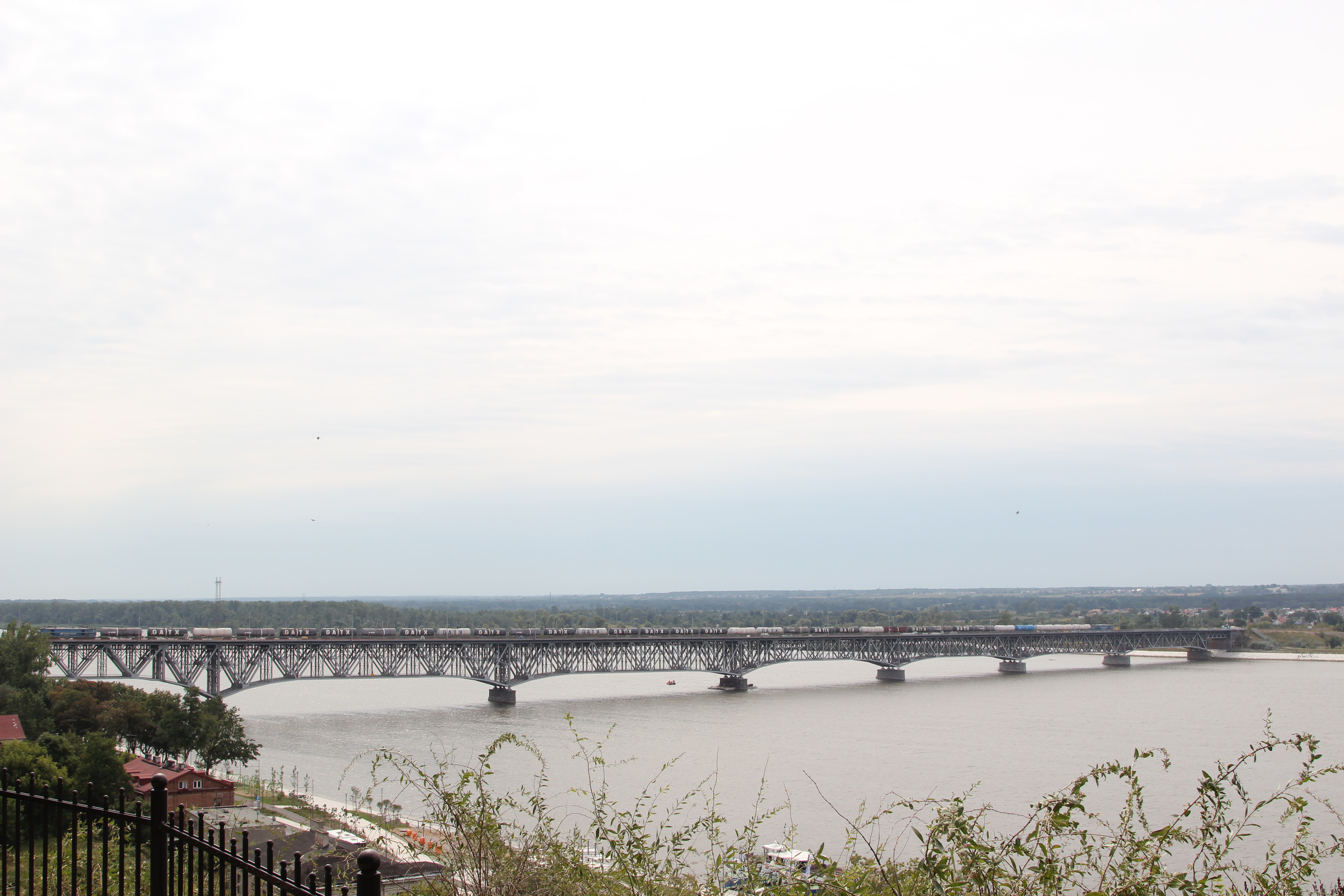

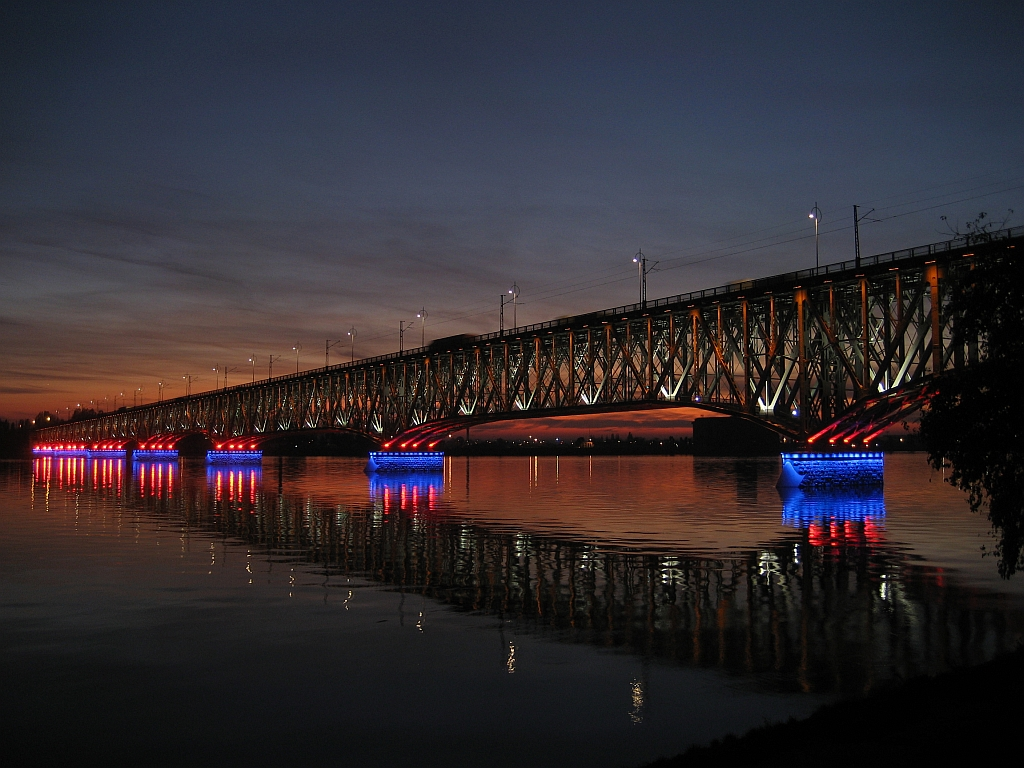
