= Velibor Gligorić =

Serbian literary critic, lecturer and academic

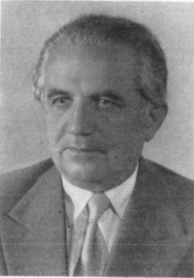
Velibor Gligorić in 1967

Velibor Gligorić (27 July 1899 – October 1977) was a Serbian university professor, literary and theatre critic, magazine editor and president of Serbian Academy of Sciences and Arts.

== Biography ==
He was born to Dimitrije Gligorić Sokoljanin, a teacher from Ljubovija, and mother Stana born Đurđević, a teacher from Novi Sad. He began law studies in France and graduated in Belgrade in 1924. After the graduation, he worked for fifteen years as an official at the Ministry of Trade and Industry of the Kingdom of Yugoslavia. Following World War II Gligorić served as Director of the National Theatre in Belgrade and as the director of the Yugoslav Drama Theatre in Belgrade for a period of ten years (1948-1958).

Gligorić was a full professor at the Faculty of Philosophy in Belgrade, well known for his sharp critical style. Velibor Gligorić became a member of SANU in 1955 and its president in 1965.

In 1969 he was president of the Council of Yugoslav Academy of Science and Art. Slovenian Academy of Sciences and Arts elected him as a corresponding member.

He was awarded the Vuk's award, 7 July Prize, AVNOJ award, Order for the People with the Golden Star, Order of the Republic with a golden wreath, Order of Fraternity and Unity and Order of labour.

Velibor Gligorić was married to Savka, a professor at the Faculty of Economics in Belgrade. Gligorić is buried in the Alley of Distinguished Citizens at the Belgrade New Cemetery.

== Selected works ==
- Kritike, 1945
- Srpski realisti, 1960
- U Vihoru, fragmenti, ogledi, studije, 1962
- Ogledi i studije, 1963
- Branislav Nušić, 1964
- Portreti, Beograd, 1965
- Hronika jednog doba, 1965
- Jakov Ignjatović, predavanje održano na Kolarčevom narodnom univerzitetu, 1949
- Kritički radovi Velibora Gligorića, 1983

Academic offices
Preceded by Ilija Đuričić	President of Serbian Academy of Sciences and Arts; 1965–1971	Succeeded by Pavle Savić
