= Constantin E. Sekeris =

Greek biochemist

- Born: June 12, 1933; Nafplio, Greece
- Died: September 15, 2009 (aged 76); Thessaloniki, Greece
- Scientific career
- Fields: Biochemistry, Molecular Biology
- Workplaces: LMU Munich, Philipps University of Marburg, Deutsches Krebsforschungszentrum, National Hellenic Research Foundation, University of Athens
- Doctoral advisor: Prof. Peter Karlson

Constantin Sekeris was a Greek biochemist and molecular biologist.

== Early life ==
He was born in Nafplio, the first capital of Greece and his paternal family home. During World War II, he accompanied his parents to Egypt, South Africa, and finally the United States (U.S.), where his father held ministerial posts in the Greek Government in exile. The family stayed in the U.S. until 1944, when, following the liberation of Greece after the defeat of Nazi Germany, they returned permanently to Greece. After his secondary education at the 8th Gymnasium of Athens, he graduated from the Medical School of the National and Kapodistrian University of Athens in 1956. After completion of Army service he joined the team of Prof. Peter Karlson at the “Institut für Physiologische Chemie” at LMU Munich. He completed his doctoral degree in biochemistry in 1962 from the Medical School at LMU Munich.

== Career ==
Sekeris accompanied Karlson in 1964, when he moved to the position of Director of the “Institut für Physiologische Chemie” of the Philipps University of Marburg. In 1966, he became a Privatdozent at the Medical School, where he was promoted to “Wissenschaftlicher Rat und Professor” in 1970, and then to a C3 Professor. In 1974, he moved to the German Cancer Research Centre (Deutsches Krebsforschungszentrum) in Heidelberg as the Head of the Section “Molecular Biology of the Cell” and a professor at the Science Faculty of Heidelberg University. Then he finally moved home to Greece as a Professor of Biochemistry at the University of Athens in 1977, first at the Department of Biology and in 1993 to the Medical School. During his tenure at the University of Athens he held a joint appointment at the Institute of Biological Research at the National Hellenic Research Foundation, serving as its director. In 2000, he reached the mandatory retirement age for the Greek Public Service, but kept performing research, unofficially, up until his death in 2009.

Sekeris’ main research interest was the mode of action of steroid hormones. He started his research working on tyrosine metabolism in insects and then rapidly moved to molecular endocrinology, where he stayed. Building on the work of Adolf_Butenandt (Karlson's father-in-law and director of the Munich Institute), Karlson and Sekeris early on proposed a model on how steroids function, which was very loosely based on Jacob and Monod's model for the regulation of the lactose operon of Escherichia coli. He concentrated his later work on steroid receptor(s) including the binding of glucocorticoid receptor to mitochondrial DNA, which he and his group first described. His overall focus could be described as the elucidation of the role of glucocorticoids in the regulation of gene expression and cellular metabolism. This research led to research on post-transcriptional events such as mRNA processing. He was the first to describe the presence of small RNA species involved in the processing of hnRNA. He published more than 250 papers and book chapters, making him one of Greece's most prolific scientists in non-clinical life sciences.

In addition to his long-term directorship of the Institute of Biological Research at the National Hellenic Research Foundation, Sekeris was involved in science administration both in Greece and abroad. He was a member of the Greek Research Council and acted as the chief executive officer of the National Hellenic Research Foundation. Among different honours that he received during his career one should mention his election to the European Molecular Biology Organization (EMBO) and the European Academy of Sciences. After leaving Germany he was made an Honorary Professor of Cell Biology at the Science Faculty of Heidelberg University.

== Family ==
Sekeris was a direct descendant of Panagiotis Sekeris, a merchant and ship owner who lived in Constantinople in the early 19th century and co-founded the Filiki Eteria (a secret society aiming to overthrow the Ottoman rule in Greece), and who spent his entire wealth financing this process. Sekeris married Lioka (Kalliope), born Platsouka (died in 1997) and then Evi, born Protopappa. He was survived by one son, Evangelos a member of the Hellenic Diplomatic Corps, three grandchildren (Kalliope, Katherine and Constantine) and his three siblings, two brothers (Giorgos and Thanassis) and one sister (Kalliope).
