= Dimitrije Nešić =

Mathematician and president of Serbian Royal Academy (1836–1904)

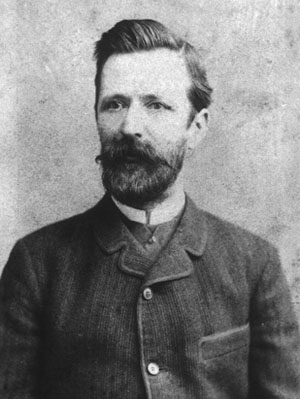
- Born: Димитрије Нешић; 20 October 1836; Belgrade, Serbia
- Died: 9 May 1904 (aged 67); Belgrade, Serbia
- Occupation: mathematician
- Known for: being a president of the Serbian Royal Academy

Dimitrije Nešić (20 October 1836 – 9 May 1904) was a Serbian mathematician, professor at the Lyceum of the Principality of Serbia and president of the Serbian Royal Academy.

== Biography ==
Nešić was born to Savka and Stojan Nešić in Belgrade, Principality of Serbia. Nešićs left their hometown Novi Pazar under Ottoman oppression on Serbian population in the area due to the First Serbian uprising. His father Stojan was craftsman and trader while his mother was housekeeper. His grandfather was merchant in Novi Pazar who came to Belgrade in 1808 because of Ottoman anti-Serb actions during the First Serbian Uprising.

Dimitrije Nešić completed his elementary and six-grade secondary education in Belgrade, and enrolled at Lyceum in 1853. After receiving a scholarship, he continued his studies at the Technical College in Vienna and the Polytechnical School at Karlsruhe. He returned to Belgrade in 1862 to become a professor of mathematics.

Nešić authored most of the modern mathematics textbooks in Kingdom of Serbia and overall improved the quality of studies in the field. He was sent by the government to travel across Europe and study various metric systems, and he later implemented the information gathered on his travels thus making the first official and modern Serbian metric system.

He was a rector of today's University of Belgrade on two terms and also president of the academy. Dimitrije Nešić was made corresponding member of JAZU and he received Order of St Sava and Order of the White Eagle.

== Selected works ==
- Metarske mere, 1874
- Trigonometrija, 1875.
- Nauka o kombinacijama, 1883.
- Algebarska analiza I, 1883.
- Algebarska analiza II, 1883

Government offices
Preceded by Andra Đorđević	Minister of Education of Serbia; 1849	Succeeded by Andra Đorđević
Academic offices
Preceded by Čedomilj Mijatović	President of Serbian Academy of Sciences and Arts; 1892–1895	Succeeded by Milan Đ. Milićević
