= Vojislav Stanovčić =

Serbian political scientist and theorist

Vojislav Stanovcic
- Born: 2 July 1930; Ubli, Kingdom of Yugoslavia
- Died: April 9, 2017 (aged 86); Belgrade, Serbia
- Occupation: Political scientist
- Organization(s): Serbian Academy of Sciences and Arts

Professor Vojislav Stanovcic (Serbian Cyrillic: Војислав Становчић) (born July 2, 1930) is a Serbian political scientist and theorist and a member of the Serbian Academy of Sciences and Arts (SANU).

== Early life ==
Stanovcic was born in Ubli, near Herceg Novi, Kingdom of Yugoslavia (today in Montenegro). He graduated from the University of Belgrade Faculty of Law (1955), continued graduate studies of the theory of law, and received PhD in Political Science from the University of Belgrade in 1965 with the dissertation “Industrial democracy – Ideas in British Socio-Political Theories”. As a postgraduate student he also studied comparative literature. Working at the Faculty of Political Science he was chosen first for the assistant professor (1968/1969), associate professor (1974) and full professor (1979) of the History of Political Theories. He was a head of the Department for Political Theory and Methodology at the Faculty of Political Science and the Head of the Graduate studies program. He retired in 1995. After retirement he taught at different departments of the graduate studies programme. Scientific-teaching Council chose him in March 2005 for the member of the Council for newly introduced American Studies program. He was elected as the chairman of the council in 2009.

== International engagements ==
During 1960–1961 he attended graduate studies at the University of Leicester, England, and Post-Doctoral Studies in Political Theory at Yale University (1966–1967) and at Harvard University (1967). As a Fulbright Visiting Professor, he taught at the SUNY-Albany in 1986-87 and in the same year (1987) he was also invited to teach at Union College (Schenectady, USA). At the invitation of the Institute for European Studies from Vienna, he was teaching from January 1993 until June 1996.

== Serbian Academy of Sciences and Arts ==
On December 15, 1988, he was elected as the corresponding member of Serbian Academy of Sciences and Arts (SASA), and as the full member on November 5, 2009. His biographical and bibliographical data were published in the Annual Publication (-{Godišnjak}-) XCV (1989 for the period before 1988), pp. 527–546; CV (1999), pp. 639–647; and C XII (for 2006), pp. 581–600. As of 2009, he is serving as the president of the Interdepartmental Committee for Studying Minorities and Human Rights and he is the member of the SASA Committee on Sources of Serbian Law. He is also the member of Scientific Council and the President of the Management Board of the Institute of Geography – Jovan Civijić and the president of the Management Board of Ethnographic Institute SASA, and member of the Scientific Council. He has been also chosen for the member of the Financial Board of SASA at the annual meeting of SASA in 2007, and for the Chairman of this Board at the Annual Meeting of the SASA in 2008. On November 13, 2007, he was re-elected by the Department of the Social Sciences for the deputy secretary of the Department, and on April 20, 2010.was elected for the secretary of the Department. Stanovcic is also appointed by SASA Executive Board for the Chairman of the SASA part od Interacademic Commission (SASA and Hungarian Academy of Sciences) to research and precisely discover the civilian victims in Vojvodina in the course and aftermath of the World War II (1941–1948) with an aim to reach reconciliation, mark places of massacres, and to promote friendship and cooperation of two states and their people.

== Special recognitions and awards ==
- According to the decision of Ministry of Public Administration and Local Self Government, the “Special group” has been formed, consisted of 9 experts for constitutional law and minority problems, the task of which is to make a draft law on the status of minorities in Republic of Serbia. Stanovčić was appointed for the head of the group.
- In 2004, Stanovčić received the reward of the Foundation “Miodrag Jovičić” for the contribution to the constitutional law and comparative political systems and institutions.
- In 2007 he received the April reward for the best book in the field of social sciences and humanities, published in 2006 (Political Theory, I, Službeni glasnik, 2006, 838 p.).
- Head of the project Ethnicity: contemporary processes in Serbia, neighbor countries and Diaspora, in the Ethnographic Institute, financed by the Ministry of Science in the period since 2006 until 2010.
- On June 9, 2010 received the Award "Vojislav K. Stojanović", which is given by Jury of the Association of University Professors and Scholars of Serbia (founded in 1923) and the name of the Award is given after a surgeon, who was world famnous for new medical technics, and for highest moral standards that he practiced and requested from others in the profession.
- On November 23, 2010 Stanovčić received the Awarded "Sigillo d'Oro" given by the Jury of the Inbtenational Center for Etno-Stories and Anthropology in Palermo (Sicily). In Italy this award is treated as equivalent to Nobel for Anthropology.

== Selected bibliography ==
- Political Theory I, Belgrade, Службени Гласник, 2006, 2008
- Power and Legitimacy, Belgrade, Службени Гласник, 2006
- Political Ideas and Religion I & II, Удружење за политичке науке (Political Science Association) and Чигоја штампа (Chigoja Press), 1999, 2003
- Vlast i Sloboda, Beograd, Удружење за политичке науке (Society for Political Sciences) and Чигоја штампа (Chigoja Press), 2003
- Macht und Legitimität, St. Gallen – Lachen, Dike Verlag, 2003
