= Solidarity Bridge =

Polish cable-stayed bridge carrying two national roads over the Vistula River

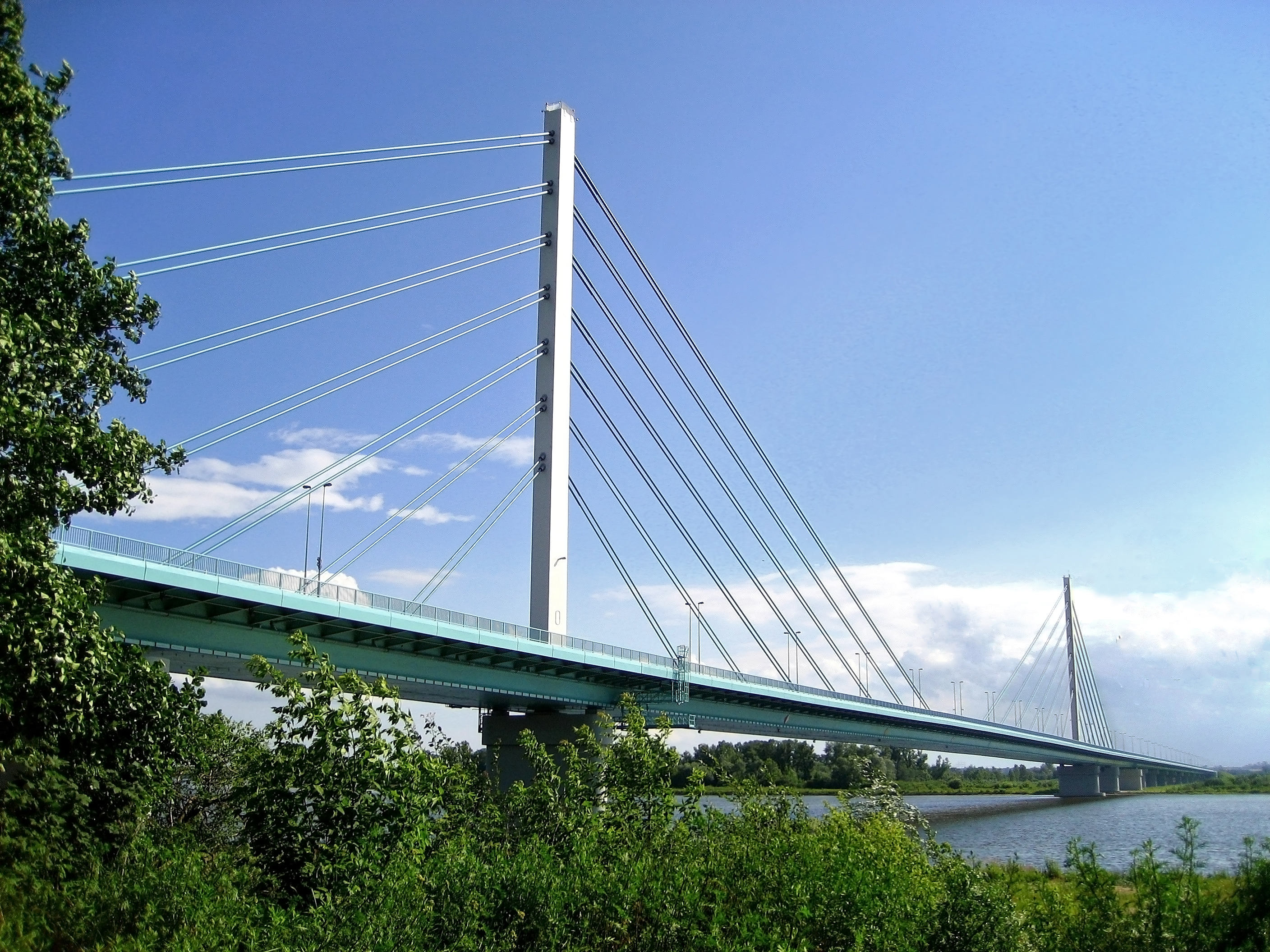
- Coordinates: 52.521667°N 19.7275°E
- Carries: 4 lanes (motor vehicles) of two national roads: national road no. 60 and national road no. 62; Pedestrians and cyclists
- Crosses: Vistula River
- Locale: Płock, Mazovia; Poland
- Official name: Most Solidarności
- Maintained by: General Directorate for National Roads and Motorways

Characteristics
- Design: Cable-stayed bridge
- Material: Steel; 2 Pylons: steel
- Total length: 1,712 metres (5,617 ft) m (1.064 mi)
- Width: 27.5 metres (90 ft)
- Height: 63.7 metres (209 ft) (pylons)
- Longest span: 375 metres (1,230 ft)
- No. of spans: 5
- Piers in water: 2
- Clearance below: 12 metres (39 ft) (at the normal level of the river)

History
- Designer: Nikola Hajdin; Bratislav Stipanić; Józef Krawczyk
- Construction start: 29 July 2002
- Construction end: 13 October 2007
- Opened: 13 October 2007

Statistics
- Toll: Free

Location
- Interactive map of Solidarity Bridge

The Solidarity Bridge (Polish: Most Solidarności) is a cable-stayed bridge over the Vistula River in Płock, Poland

The bridge is part of the Fr. Jerzy Popiełuszko thoroughfare which forms the southern bypass of Płock. It constitutes a shared segment of two national roads – DK 60 and DK 62.

The main span of the Solidarity Bridge is 375 meters long. The main span is one of the longest in the world among cable stayed bridges with cables located in single plane. At the same time, it is the longest span in the world among cable stayed bridges with a fixed-in deck pylon.

The main span of the Solidarity Bridge is the longest span in Poland and this part of Europe.

The Solidarity Bridge in Płock is largest and longest cable-stayed bridge in Poland at 615 meters long.

== History ==
Plans for the bridge and the Fr. Jerzy Popiełuszko thoroughfare first appeared in the 1990s to relief the Legions of Marshal Józef Piłsudski road-railway bridge located in the city center, built in 1938, which has only one traffic lane in each direction and is the only crossing in the vicinity.

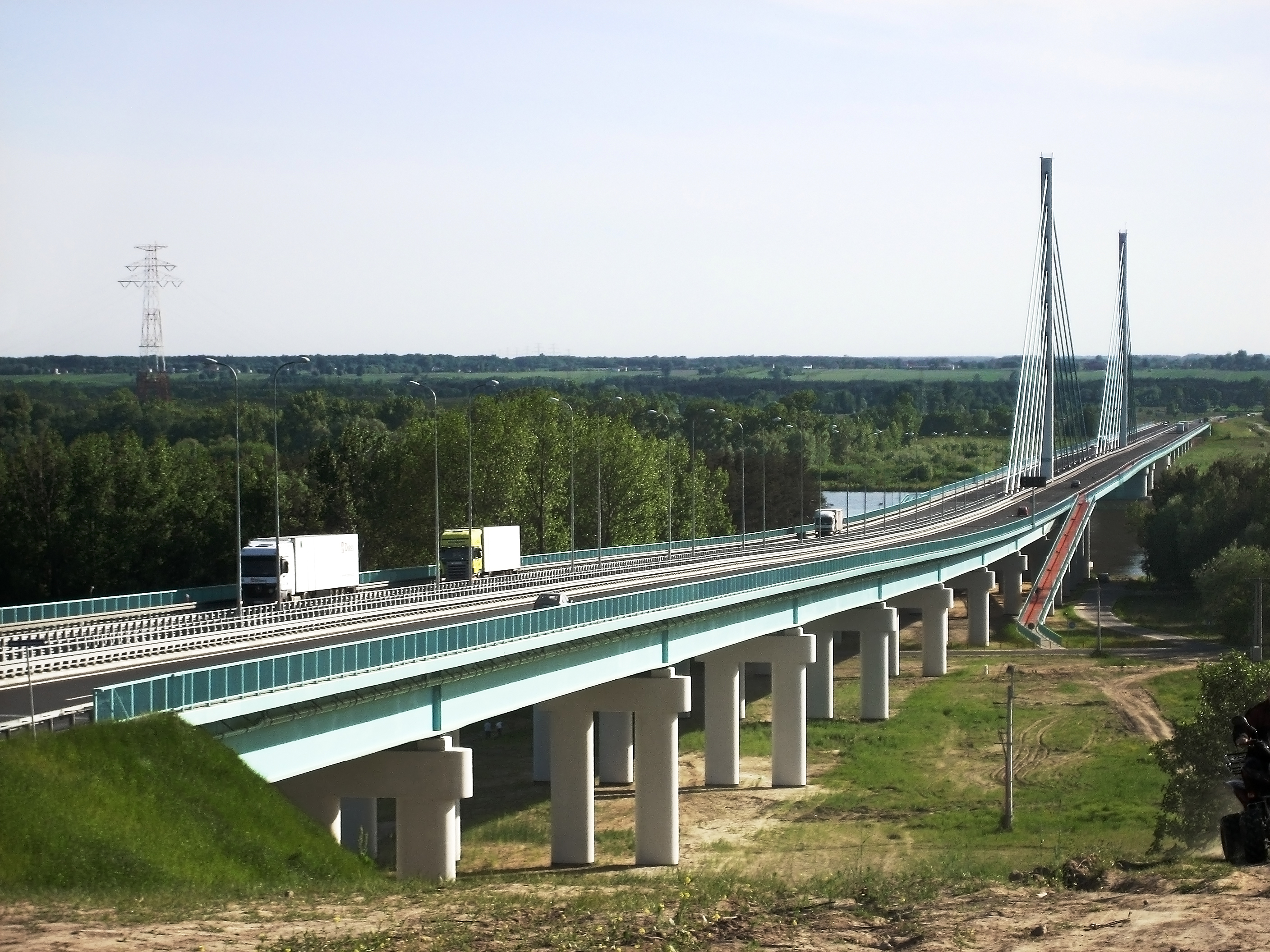
Bridge on the right-bank of the river

Construction of the bridge started in July 2002 and finished in October 2007 along with a modernization of the Wyszogrodzka Street leading to the city center. On October 13, 2007 the bridge was officially opened by prime minister Jarosław Kaczyński. The entire route of the bypass was finished in 2009.

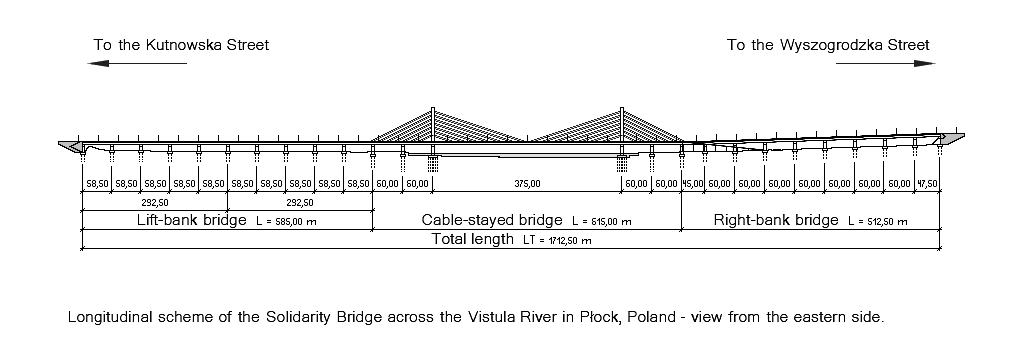
Scheme of the Solidarity Bridge in Płock

== See also ==
- Solidarity Bridge in Płock on the list of largest cable-stayed bridges
