= Dušan Čamprag =

Serbian entomologist (1925–2021)

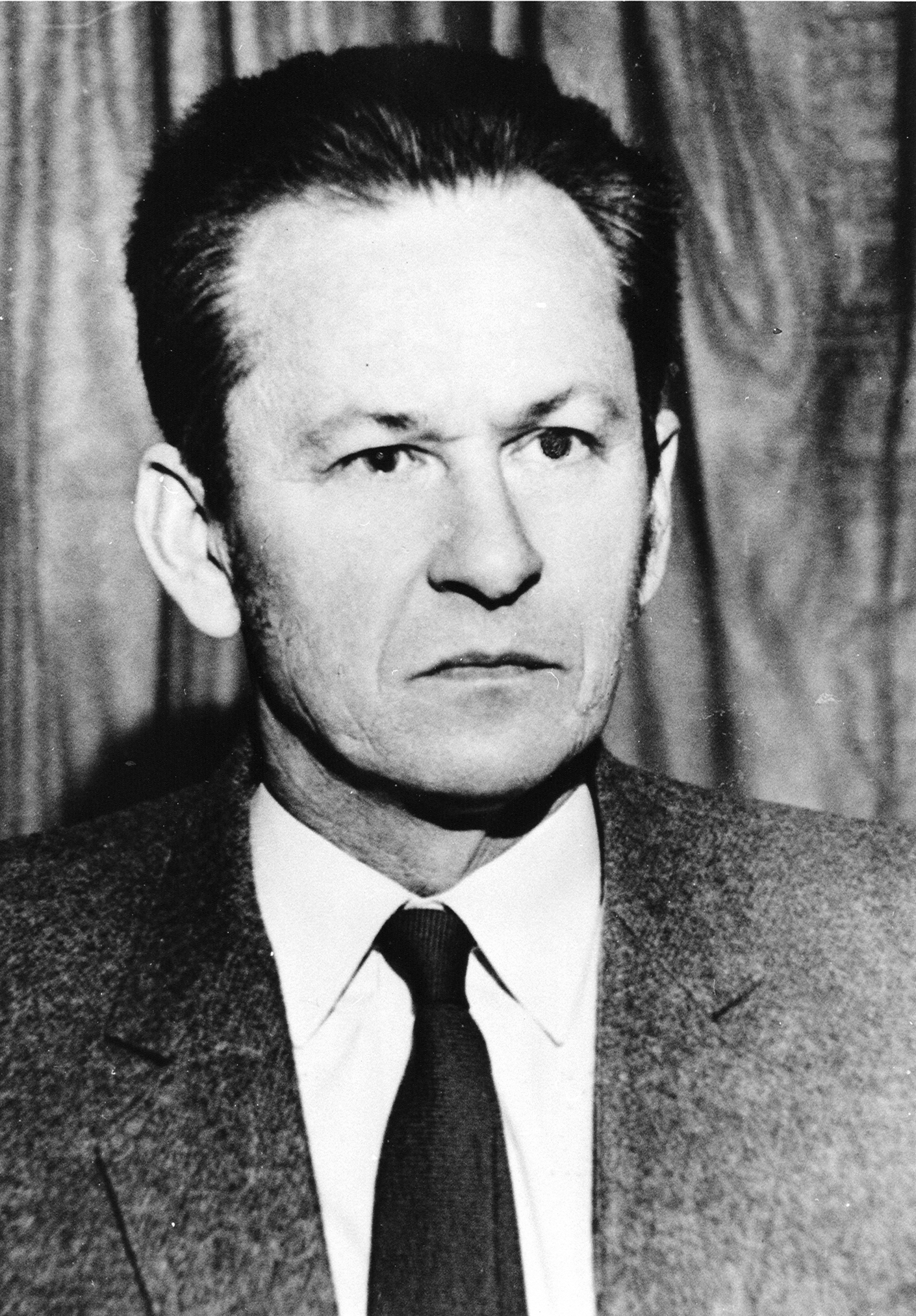
- Born: 14 March 1925; Ada, Kingdom of Serbs, Croats and Slovenes
- Died: 22 March 2021 (aged 96); Novi Sad, Serbia
- Occupation: Entomologist

Dušan Čamprag (Serbian Cyrillic: Душан Чампраг; 14 March 1925 – 22 March 2021) was a Serbian entomologist. He was a member of the Serbian Academy of Sciences and Arts. His studies primarily centered around agricultural entomology and phytomedicine.

== Biography ==
Born in Ada, Čamprag spent his primary and secondary studies in Novi Sad and entered the Faculty of Agriculture at the University of Belgrade in 1946. He graduated from the university in 1951 and became an assistant professor at the University of Novi Sad in 1957. He earned his doctorate from the university's Faculty of Agriculture in 1961 with a thesis on curculionidae in the Bačka region. He became a full professor in 1975.

In 1982, Čamprag was elected to the Hungarian Entomological Society as an honorary member. In 1989, he received a doctor honoris causa from the University of Pannonia. In 1979, he was elected as a corresponding member of the Vojvodina Academy of Sciences and Arts, and became a full member in 1987. He was elected as a corresponding member of the Serbian Academy of Sciences and Arts in 1991 and became a full member in 1998. In 2004, he became a foreign member of the Hungarian Academy of Sciences.

Dušan Čamprag died in Novi Sad on 22 March 2021 at the age of 96.
