= Aleksandar Belić =

Serbian linguist and academic (1876–1960)

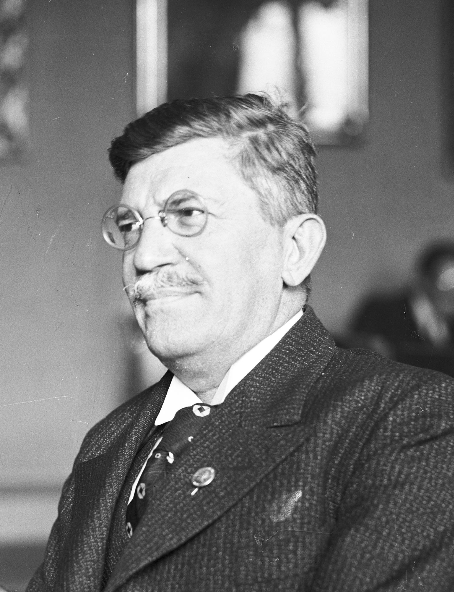
- Aleksandar Belić in 1934
- Born: 15 August 1876; Belgrade, Serbia
- Died: 26 February 1960 (aged 83); Belgrade, PR Serbia, Yugoslavia
- Resting place: Belgrade New Cemetery
- Occupations: Writer and linguist
- Writing career
- Language: Serbian

Aleksandar Belić (Serbian Cyrillic: Александар Белић, pronounced [aleksǎːndar běːlitɕ]; 15 August 1876 – 26 February 1960) was a Serbian linguist and academic.

== Biography ==
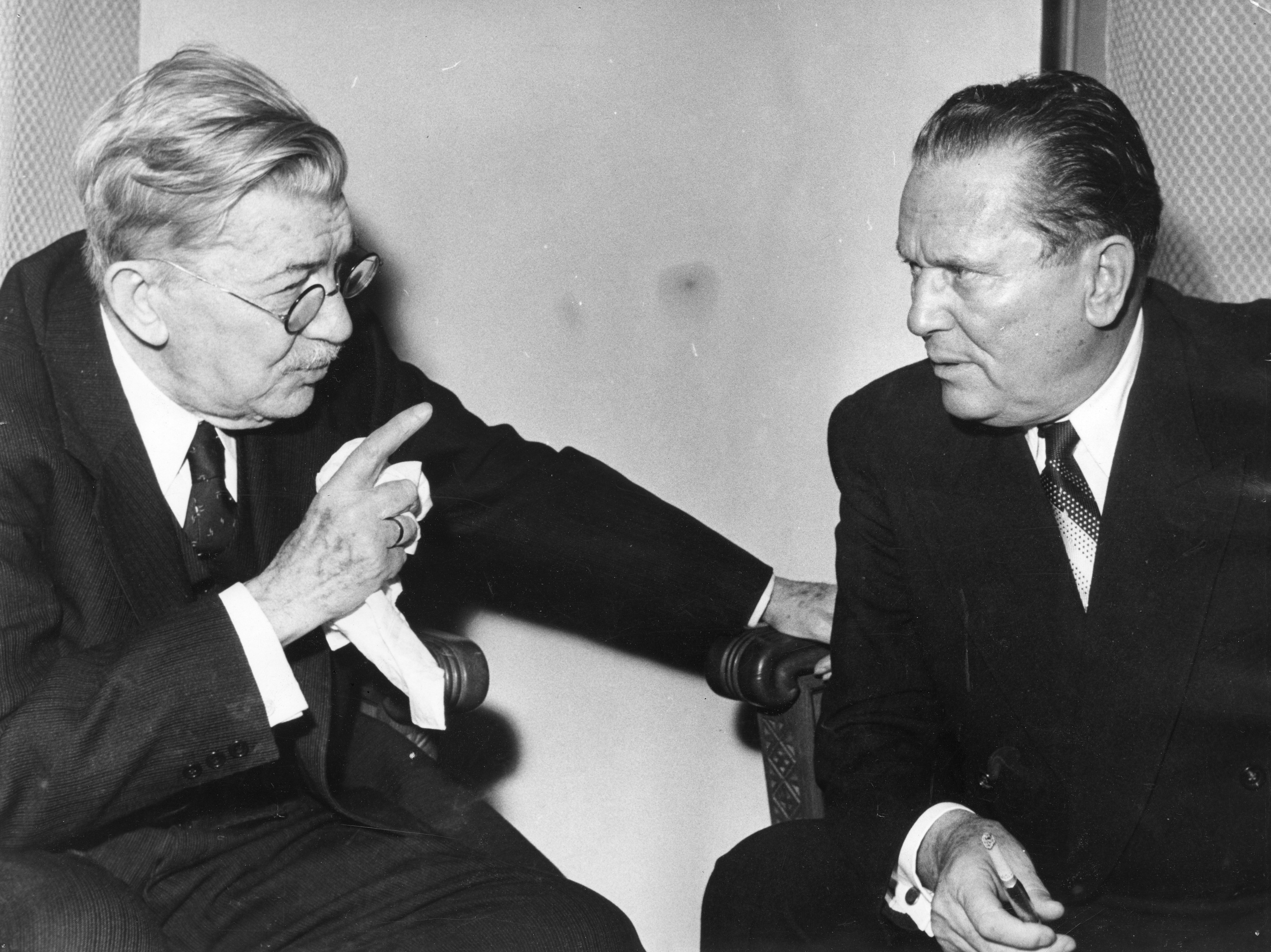
Aleksandar Belić with Josip Broz Tito in 1954.

Belić was born in Belgrade. After studying Slavic languages in Belgrade, Odessa, and Moscow, he received his PhD at Leipzig University in 1900. He worked at the University of Belgrade and Belgrade Higher School during his academic career. He was a member and longtime president of the Serbian Academy of Sciences. His membership lasted between 1937 and 1960 with the interruption in the 1941-1944 period of the Axis occupation of Serbia when he was suspended.

Belić is generally considered the leading Serbian linguist of the first half of the twentieth century. His research dealt with comparative Slavic studies, general linguistics, Serbo-Croatian dialectology, and syntax. He authored Pravopis srpskohrvatskog književnog jezika (Standard Serbo-Croatian Normative Guide, 1923) which was based on a strictly phonological spelling principle. He wrote extensively on Čakavian and Kajkavian dialects and made a significant contribution to Slavic accentology with his discovery of the Slavic neoacute accent in Čakavian. Belić introduced the tripartite division of Kajkavian based on the reflexes of Proto-Slavic *tj and *dj, which was first published in Stanojević's Narodna enciklopedija srpsko-hrvatsko-slovenačka (Serbo-Croatian-Slovene National Encyclopedia, 1927), although disproved by later dialectology studies. He contributed to the acceptance of the so-called Belgrade style of standard Serbian. During his entire life he was a consistent advocate of a unified Serbo-Croatian language.

Belić's selected works have been published in 14 volumes in 1999. He died in Belgrade.

== Selected works ==
- Dijalekti istočne i južne Srbije (1903)
- Dijalektološka karta srpskog jezika
- Akcentske studije
- O dvojini u slovenskim jezicima
- Galički dijalekt
- O jezičkoj prirodi i jezičkom razvitku (1941)
- Pravopis srpsko-hrvatskog književnog jezika (1923)

Academic offices
Preceded by Bogdan Gavrilović	President of Serbian Academy of Sciences and Arts; 1937–1960	Succeeded by Ilija Đuričić
Preceded by Vladimir K. Petković	Rector of the University of Belgrade; 1933–1934	Succeeded by Vladimir Ćorović
