= Branko Peruničić =

Yugoslav Serbian historian, sociologist, archivist and ethnographer

Branko Peruničić (Serbian: Бранко Перуничић, d. 23 June 1993) was a Serbian historian, archivist, sociologist and ethnographer.

== Biography ==
He was a Yugoslav Partisan veteran and a member of the Serbian Academy of Sciences (SAN). He defended his thesis on 15 September 1954. Since 1954 he was the scientific counsellor of SAN. He wrote monographs on various subjects such as cadastral books, metochion, life in South Serbia, Ottoman-era atrocities, more than 30 cities and towns of Serbia. By 1964 he had released over 800 documents of the Belgrade Court during Prince Miloš Obrenović's first reign. He wrote 2,000 pages on the destroyed texts of the 1941 bombing of Belgrade.

Peruničić died on 23 June 1993 in Belgrade, having a career spanning four decades. He authored 36 voluminous books, with an average 1,000–1,800 pages.

== Work ==
- Државни попис у Горнјој Ресави 1863. године, 1990
- Peruničić, Branko (1989). Зулуми ага и бегова у Косовском вилајету. Nova knjiga. ISBN 978-86-7335-059-2.
- Сведочанство о Косову 1901–1913., 1988
- Писма српских конзула из Приштине (1890–1900), 1985
- Земљишна својина у Србији 1815-1845, 1977
- Град Пожаревац и његово управно подручје, Пожаревац, 1977
- Град Параћин 1815–1915, 1975
- Град Светозарево 1806–1915, 1975
- Град Ваљево и његово управно подручје 1815-1915, 1973
- Крушевац у једном веку ( 1815–1915 ), 1971
- Управа вароши Београда 1820 – 1912, 1970
- Чачак и Горњи Милановац 1815—1865, 1969
- "Beogradsko" (PDF). Godišnja. 1967.
- Једно столеће Краљева, 1966
- "Seoski potesi" (PDF). Zbornik. 1964.
- Београдски суд 1819-1839, 1964
- Попис становништва и пољопривреде у срезу Јасеничком 1863. године., 1963
- Српско средњевековно село, 1956
- Подаци о насељима нахије соколске
- Попис турских земаља и кућа у Шапцу
- ПУТОПИС МИТРОПОЛИТА НИЋИФОРА ПЕРИЋА КРОЗ КОСОВО САНЏАК 1906 . ГОДИНЕ

== Sources ==
- Marković, Milena. "Др Бранко Перуничић, великан историографије: Сачувао Србију од заборава". Novosti.
- ""Велика Албанија" чека издавача". Politika.
- Radenić, Andrija (1993-06-26). "Борба, 26. 06. 1993., стр. 38".
- Milić, Božidar. "Preminuo dr Branko Peruničic".
