= Teodor Atanacković =

Serbian scientist

Teodor Atanacković

Teodor Atanackovic (born 1945, Sibac, Serbia) is full professor of Mechanics since 1988 at the Faculty of Technical Sciences at the University of Novi Sad. He graduated from the Mechanical Engineering faculty in Novi Sad in 1969. In 1974 he obtained a PhD degree at Department of Mechanics, University of Kentucky, Lexington Ky. USA. He held Alexander von Humboldt research fellowship at the Technische Universität Berlin, Germany. Since 2009 he is full member of Serbian Academy of Sciences and Arts and in 2014 he was elected Professor emeritus of the University of Novi Sad. At present he is Secretary of the Branch in Novi Sad of Serbian Academy of Sciences and Arts. His research interests include Continuum mechanics, Variational principles of mechanics, Shape memory materials, Visco-elasticity of fractional type, Biomechanics, Stability of elastic systems, and the problems of Shape optimization of elastic rods.

== Bibliography ==
- T. M. Atanackovic, Stability Theory of Elastic Rods. World Scientific, New Jersey, 1997.
- T. M. Atanackovic, A. Guran, Theory of Elasticity for Scientists and Engineers. Birkhauser, Boston 2000.
- Т. М. Атанацкович, А. Гуран, Лекции по Теории упругости, (translation with corrections of: T. M. Atanackovic and A. Guran, Lectures on Elasticity Theory) Санкт Петерсбургскии государствени университет 2003.
- B. D. Vujanovic and T. M. Atanackovic, An Introduction to Modern Variational Techniques in Mechanics and Engineering. Birkhauser, Boston 2004.
- T.M. Atanackovic, S.Pilipovic, B. Stankovic, D. Zorica, Fractional calculus with Application in Mechanics: Vibrations and Diffusion Processes, ISTE, London, John Wiley & Sons, New York, 2014.
- T.M. Atanackovic, S.Pilipovic, B. Stankovic, D. Zorica, Fractional calculus with Application in Mechanics: Wave Propagation, Impact and Variational Principles, ISTE, London, John Wiley & Sons, New York, 2014.
