= Ilija Đuričić =

Serbian veterinary physician and academic

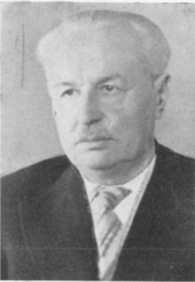
Ilija Đuričić

Ilija Đuričić (18 July 1898 – 2 April 1965) was a Serbian veterinary physician, professor, rector of the University of Belgrade and president of Serbian Academy of Sciences and Arts.

Đuričić was born in Ripanj.

He was elected member of SANU in 1950 and went on to serve as head of the academy in 1960–1965. He authored a number of books and was a full professor at the University of Belgrade and served as the rector on three separate terms.

Ilija Đuričić was awarded the 7th July prize, Order of labour and elected corresponding member of Slovenian Academy of Sciences and Arts.

Academic offices
Preceded by Aleksandar Belić	President of Serbian Academy of Sciences and Arts; 1969–1965	Succeeded by Velibor Gligorić
Preceded by Stevan Jakovljević	Rector of the University of Belgrade; 1950–1952	Succeeded by Vukić Mićović
