= Nebojša Radunović =

Serbian academic (1954–2026)

Nebojša V. Radunović (Serbian: Небојша Радуновић; 18 May 1954 – 15 September 2026) was a Serbian academic who was a university professor of obstetrics and gynecology at the University of Belgrade's School of Medicine, Chair of the Human reproduction department at the Institute for Obstetrics and Gynecology, Clinical Center of Serbia and a corresponding member of the Serbian Academy of Sciences and Arts.

== Early life, education and career ==
Nebojša Radunović was born in Kosovska Mitrovica, Kosovo, then FPR Yugoslavia on 18 May 1954. He received his M.D. with special distinction from the Belgrade Medical School in 1978. In 1982 he was awarded his master's degree, and in 1985 he completed his PhD studies at the same faculty. In 1986 he was given the title of assistant professor. In 1998 he was elected associate professor and in 2001, he was appointed full professor.

He completed a residency in obstetrics and gynecology in 1985. and a fellowship in perinatal medicine in 1987 at the Institute for Obstetrics and Gynecology at the University of Belgrade.

After spending four years in the Department of High-risk pregnancy at Institute for Obstetrics and Gynecology University of Belgrade, he was awarded a Fulbright Foundation fellowship and worked at Mount Sinai School of Medicine from 1990 to 1991. From 1997 he served as adjunct professor of Clinical Obstetrics at the Department of Obstetrics and Gynecology at the New York University (NYU) School of Medicine.

Radunović garnered multiple teaching awards, authored many peer-reviewed publications, and invited reviews on high-risk pregnancy, prenatal diagnosis, fetal pathology and fetal therapy.

His service to professional organizations includes work as the president of Southeast European Society for Perinatal Medicine, President of Serbian Society for perinatal medicine, member of educational committee of the European Association for Perinatal Medicine and board member of International society – Fetus as a Patient.

== Research ==
Radunović's primary research interests included the fetal physiology and pathophysiology, the pathogenesis of adverse pregnancy outcomes associated with assisted reproduction techniques and maternal inherited diseases, and the pathogenesis and prediction of preterm delivery. Notable discoveries include elucidation of mechanisms underlying fetal reaction and adaptation to intrauterine invasive diagnostic and therapeutic procedures CVS, AC, Cordocentesis, Intrauterine transfusions and fetal shunting.

== Death ==
Radunović died on 15 September 2026, at the age of 72.
