= Stevan Pilipović =

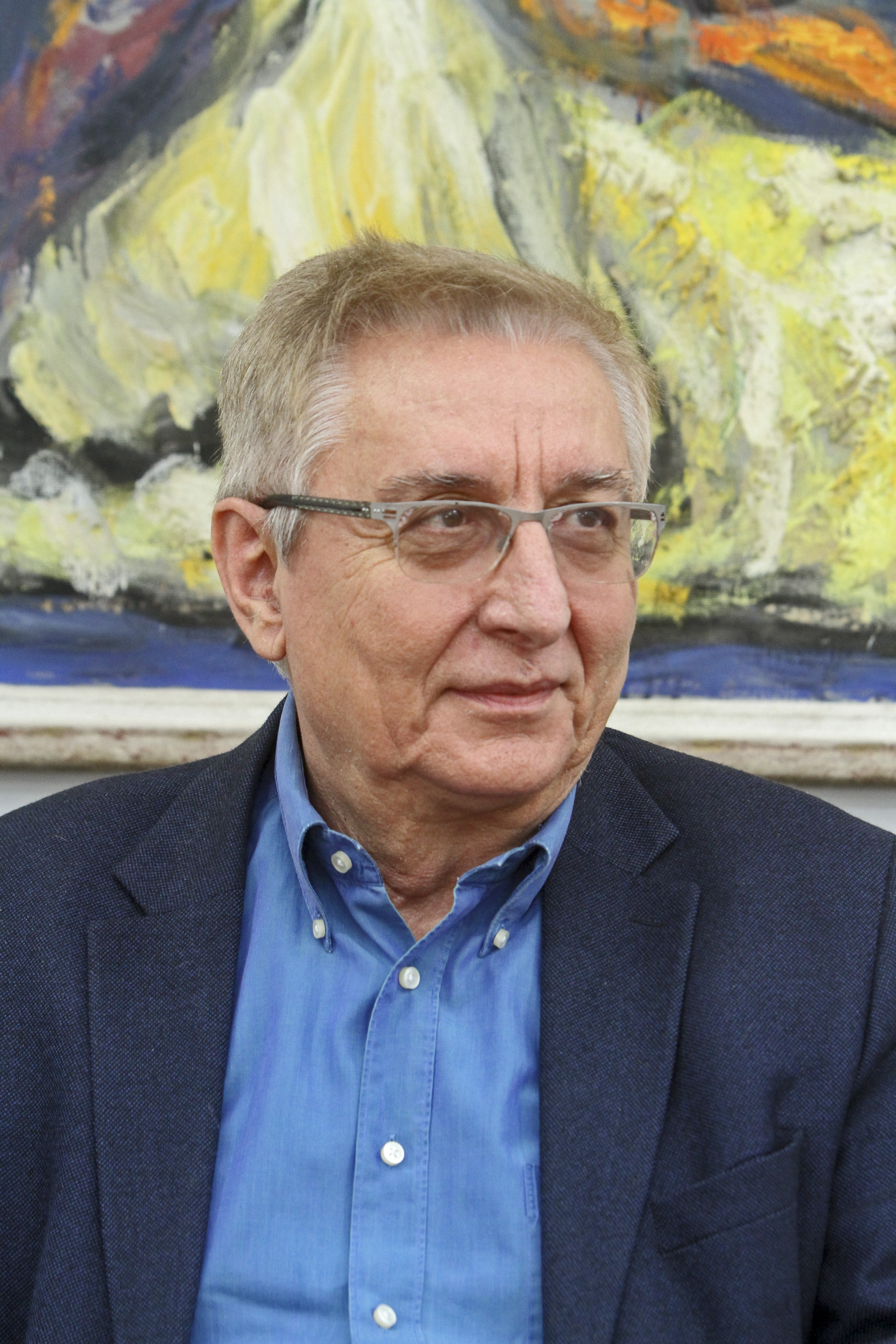
- Born: 1950 (age 75–76); Novi Sad, Yugoslavia
- Occupation: Mathematician

Stevan Pilipović (born 1950, in Novi Sad, Yugoslavia) is a Professor of Mathematics. He has taught at the Department of Mathematics and Informatics of Novi Sad University since 1987.

== Biography ==
He received a Bachelor of Science in Mathematics from the University of Novi Sad in 1973 and a MSc from the University of Belgrade in 1977. He received his PhD in 1979.

Since 2009, he is an academician of the Serbian Academy of Sciences and Arts. His research interests include functional analysis, generalized functions and hyperfunctions, pseudo-differential operators, time–frequency analysis, linear and nonlinear equations with singularities. Moreover, he is also interested in applications of mathematics in mechanics with applications in medicine. Currently he is a president of the Novi Sad Branch of the Serbian Academy of Sciences and Arts and the leader of the Center of excellence Center for Mathematical Research in Nonlinear Phenomena at the Faculty of Science of Novi Sad University. He is Editor in chief of Publ. Inst. Math. (Beograd).

== Bibliography ==
- Pilipović, S., Stanković, B., Takači, A., Asymptotic of Generalized Functions and the Stieltjes Transformation of Distributions, Teubner Texte zur Mathematik, Band 116, 1990.
- Nedeljkov, M., Pilipović, S., Scarpalezos, D., Linear Theory of Colombeau's Generalized Functions, Addison Wesley, Longman, 1998.
- Carmichael, R., Kaminski, A., Pilipović, S., Boundary Values and Convolution in Ultradistribution Spaces, ISAAC Series on Analysis Applications and Computations, Vol. 1, World Scientific, 2007.
- Pilipović, S., Stanković, B., Vindas, J., Asymptotic behavior of generalized functions. Series on Analysis, Applications and Computation, 5. World Scientific Publishing Co. Pte. Ltd., Hackensack, NJ, 2012.
- Atanacković, T. M., Pilipović, S., Stanković, B., Zorica, D., Fractional Calculus with Applica-tions in Mechanics: Vibrations and Diffusion Processes, ISTE – Wiley, 2014, London.
- Atanacković, T. M., Pilipović, S., Stanković, B., Zorica, Fractional Calculus with Applications in Mechanics: Wave Propagation, Impact and Variational Principles, ISTE – Wiley, 2014, London.
