= Nikola Hajdin =

Serbian construction engineer (1923–2019)

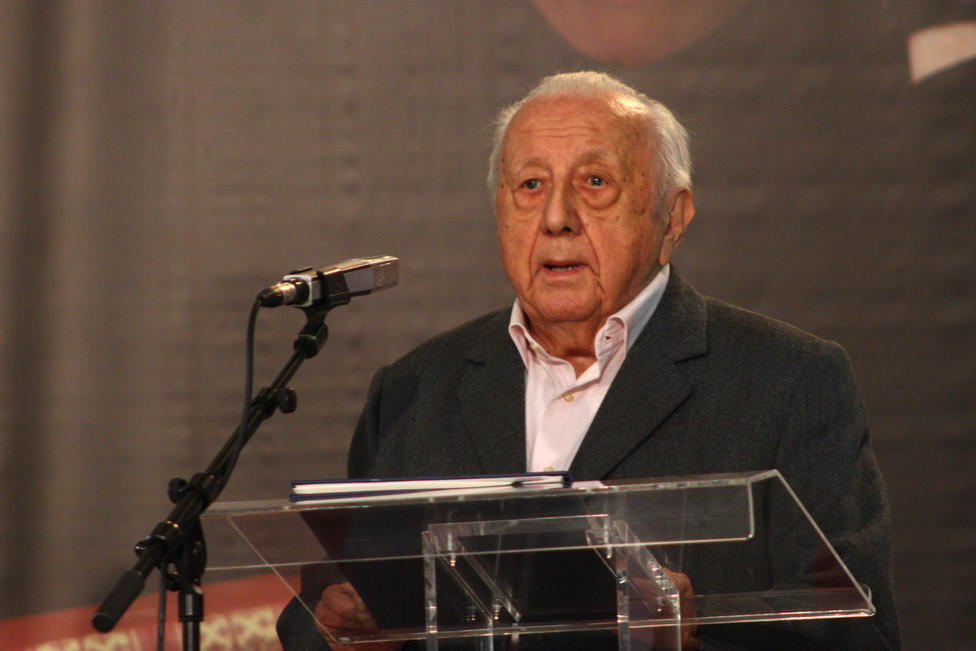
- Born: 4 April 1923; Vrbovsko, Kingdom of Serbs, Croats and Slovenes
- Died: 17 July 2019 (aged 96); Belgrade, Serbia
- Notable work: Solidarity Bridge, New Railway Bridge, Liberty Bridge

Nikola Hajdin (Serbian Cyrillic: Никола Хајдин; 4 April 1923 – 17 July 2019) was a Serbian construction engineer, professor and the president of the Serbian Academy of Sciences and Arts, as a member of the Department of Technical Sciences.

== Biography ==
As a construction engineer, he built many bridges in Yugoslavia; most prominently the New Railway Bridge in Belgrade and the Liberty Bridge in Novi Sad. Nikola Hajdin also designed the bridge which was built in 2007 in Poland - the Solidarity Bridge in Płock over the Vistula river.

Hajdin was professor of the University of Belgrade Faculty of Civil Engineering. He held masters and doctoral degrees from the same school (his mentor was professor Jakov Hlitčijev). He was also a member of the European Academy of Sciences and Arts, Slovenian Academy of Sciences and Arts and other organisations.

Hajdin stated in an interview that the controversial SANU Memorandum was never the official document of the Academy and that it didn't contain anything malicious.

Academic offices
| Preceded by Dejan Medaković | President of Serbian Academy of Sciences and Arts; 2003–2015 | Succeeded by Vladimir S. Kostić |
