= Molecular Endocrinology =

- Discipline: Endocrinology
- Language: English
- Edited by: Donald B. DeFranco

Publication details
- History: 1987–present
- Publisher: The Endocrine Society (United States)
- Frequency: Monthly
- Impact factor: 3.993 (2016)

Standard abbreviations
- ISO 4: Mol. Endocrinol.

Indexing
- CODEN: MOENEN
- ISSN: 0888-8809 (print); 1944-9917 (web)
- LCCN: 87654442
- OCLC no.: 13739260

Links
- Journal homepage

Molecular Endocrinology is a peer-reviewed journal that publishes research on the molecular processes of hormones.
