= Vladimir S. Kostić =

Vladimir S. Kostić Владимир С. Костић
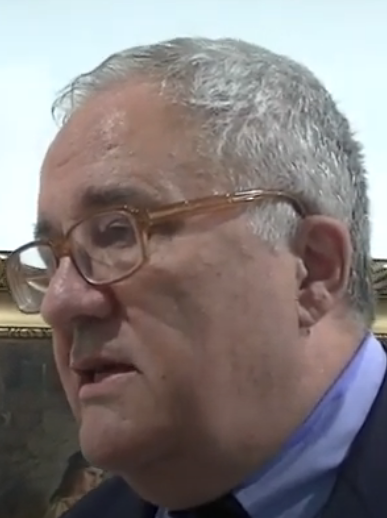
- Photo of Kostić in 2017
- Born: Belgrade, Yugoslavia
- Education: University of Belgrade Faculty of Medicine
- Scientific career
- Fields: Neurology, Neuroscience
- Workplaces: University of Belgrade Faculty of Medicine

Vladimir S. Kostić (Serbian Cyrillic: Владимир С. Костић; born October 18, 1953), is a Serbian neurologist, neuroscientist, university professor and a former President of the Serbian Academy of Sciences and Arts.

== Biography ==
Kostić graduated from the University of Belgrade Faculty of Medicine. He is a full professor at the Belgrade Medical School and Director of the Institute for Neurology. Between 2002 and 2004 he was Dean of the Faculty of Medicine. He is a full member of the Serbian Academy of Sciences and Arts and of other Serbian and international scientific societies.

His chief areas of scientific research are in Parkinson's disease and Alzheimer's disease.

In January 2021, a group of citizens protested in front of the SANU building because of Kostić's controversial statement that Kosovo "de jure and de facto isn't ours (Serbian)."

During the 2022 Serbian general election Kostić supported the Do not let Belgrade drown political organization and the We Must coalition.

== Selected works ==
- Stefanova, Elka D; Kostic, Vladimir S; Ziropadja, Ljubomir; Markovic, Milan (2000), "Visuomotor Skill Learning on Serial Reaction Time Task in Patients With Early Parkinson's Disease", Movement Disorders, 15 (6), Movement Disorders: Raven Press: 1095–1103, doi:10.1002/1531-8257(200011)15:6<1095::AID-MDS1006>3.0.CO;2-R, ISSN 0885-3185, OCLC 92738885, PMID 11104191, S2CID 241657
- Kozic, Dusko; Kostic, Vladimir S (2001), "IMAGES IN NEUROLOGY - Crossed Cerebrocerebellar Atrophy", Archives of Neurology, 58 (11), Archives of Neurology: Chicago, American Medical Association: 1929–1930, doi:10.1001/archneur.58.11.1929, ISSN 0003-9942, OCLC 96596879, PMID 11709005
- Petrovic, Natasa Cerovac Igor; Klein, Christine; Kostic, Vladimir S (2007), "Delayed-onset dystonia due to perinatal asphyxia: A prospective study", Movement Disorders, 22 (16), Movement Disorders.: Raven Press: 2426–2429, doi:10.1002/mds.21747, ISSN 0885-3185, OCLC 190754323, PMID 17894340, S2CID 1558644

Academic offices
| Preceded by Nikola Hajdin | President of Serbian Academy of Sciences and Arts; 2015–present | Incumbent |
