= Vladimir Kanjuh =

Vladimir Kanjuh (Serbian Cyrillic: Владимир Кањух; Ohrid, 4 March 1929) is a professor of pathology and cardiovascular pathology at the University of Belgrade's School of Medicine. He was the editor-in-chief of the journal Medical Investigation for 20 years.

== Life ==
Kanjuh defended his PhD thesis “Histopathological changes of the pulmonary blood vessels in CHD“ in 1981, in Belgrade.
