= Serbian Academy of Sciences and Arts =

Most prominent academic institution in Serbia

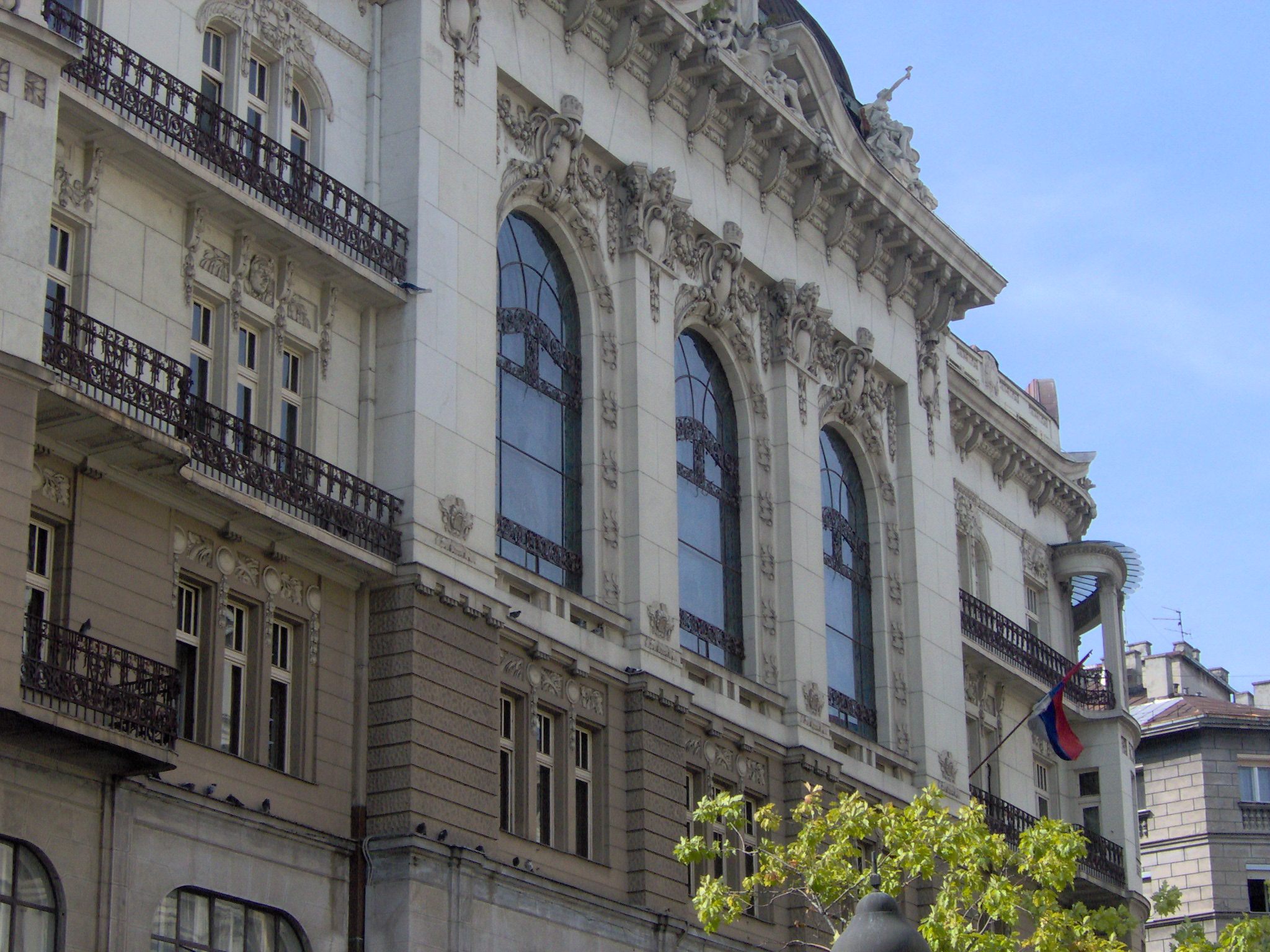
- Angular view of SANU facade in Belgrade, Serbia
- Abbreviation: SANU / САНУ
- Formation: 1841; 185 years ago
- Type: National academy
- Purpose: Science, arts, academics
- Headquarters: Knez Mihailova St. 35, Belgrade, Serbia
- Location: 44°49′5.4912″N 20°27′21.1176″E
- President: Zoran Knežević
- Budget: €5.72 million (2020, planned)
- Website: www.sanu.ac.rs

The Serbian Academy of Sciences and Arts (Latin: Academia Scientiarum et Artium Serbica; Serbian: Српска академија наука и уметности, САНУ, romanized: Srpska akademija nauka i umetnosti, SANU) is a national academy and the most prominent academic institution in Serbia, founded in 1841 as Society of Serbian Letters (Serbian: Друштво србске словесности, ДСС, romanized: Društvo srbske slovesnosti, DSS).

The Academy's membership has included Nobel laureates Ivo Andrić, Leopold Ružička, Vladimir Prelog, Glenn T. Seaborg, Mikhail Sholokhov, Aleksandr Solzhenitsyn, and Peter Handke as well as, Josif Pančić, Jovan Cvijić, Branislav Petronijević, Vlaho Bukovac, Mihajlo Pupin, Nikola Tesla, Milutin Milanković, Mihailo Petrović-Alas, Mehmed Meša Selimović, Danilo Kiš, Paja Jovanović, Dmitri Mendeleev, Victor Hugo, Leo Tolstoy, Jacob Grimm, Antonín Dvořák, Henry Moore and many other scientists, scholars and artists of Serbian and foreign origin.

== History ==
=== Predecessors ===
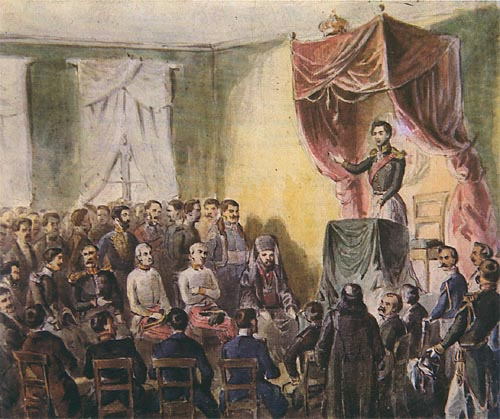
Prince Michael speaks to the Society of Serbian Scholarship members at the first meeting on June 8, 1842, by Anastas Jovanović

The Serbian Royal Academy of Sciences (Serbian: Српска краљевска академија, СКА, romanized: Srpska kraljevska akademija, SKA) was the successor to the Serbian Learned Society (Serbian: Српско учено друштво, СУД, romanized: Srpsko učeno društvo, SUD) with which it merged in 1892 and accepted its members as its own either regular or honorary members, its tasks and its place in scientific and cultural life. The same had occurred several decades earlier when the Serbian Learned Society on 29 July 1864 took over the place and functions of the Society of Serbian Scholarship (Serbian: Друштво српске словесности, ДСС, romanized: Društvo srpske slovesnosti, DSS), the first learned society in the Principality of Serbia, founded on 7 November 1841. The Serbian Royal Academy of Sciences was led by members, such as Jovan Cvijić.

In 1864, the Society elected to its membership international revolutionary figures as Giuseppe Garibaldi, Nikolay Chernyshevsky, and Alexander Herzen, and was immediately abolished for this action by the conservative government of Prince Mihailo Obrenović.

=== Founding of Serbian Royal Academy ===
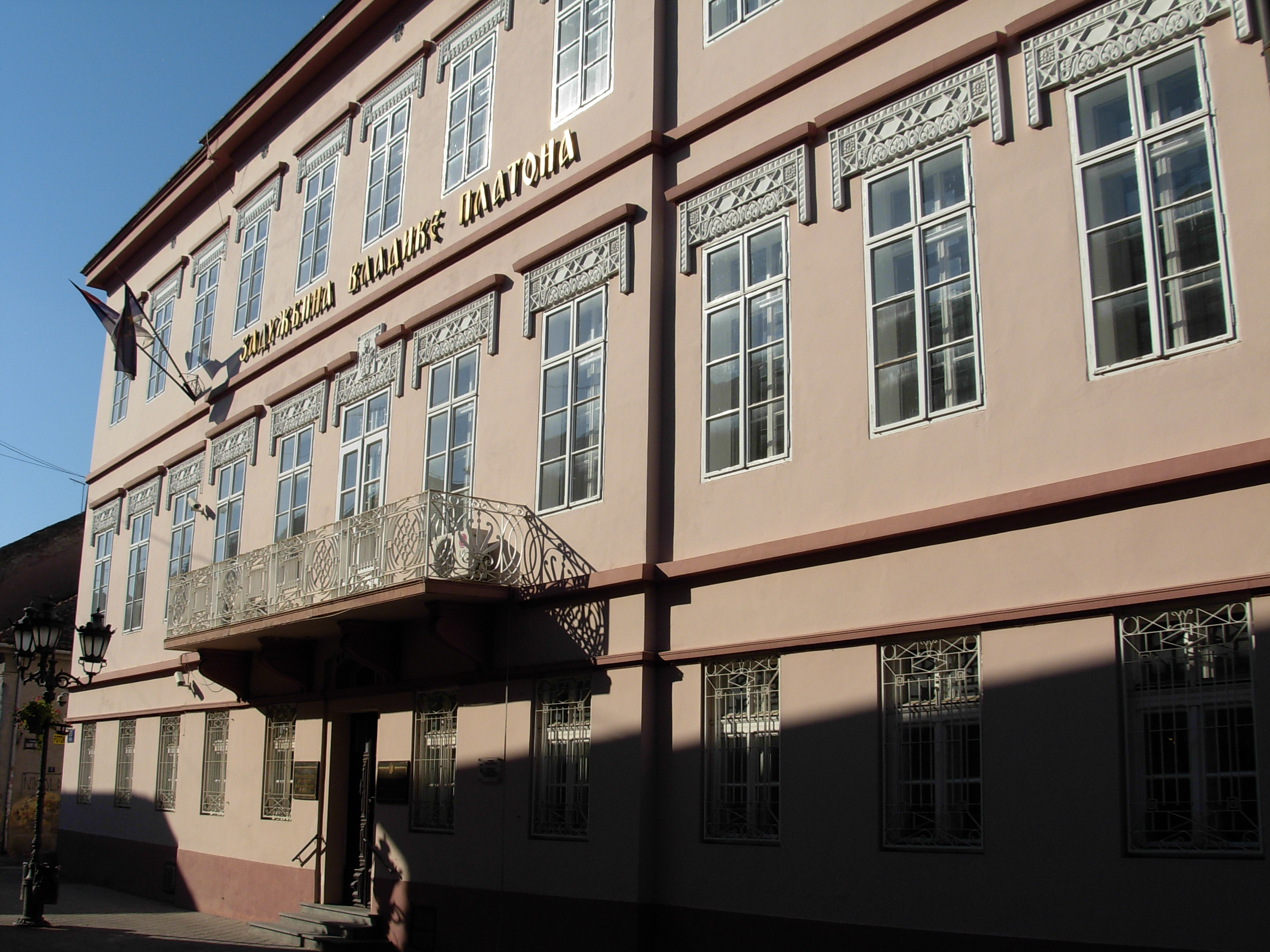
The SANU department in Novi Sad

Since the Serbian Academy of Sciences and Arts was founded by law (as the Serbian Royal Academy) of 1 November 1886, it has been the highest academic institution in Serbia. According to the Royal Academy Founding Act, King Milan was to appoint the first academic, who would then choose other members of the academy. The names of the first academics were announced by King Milan on 5 April 1887. At that time, there existed four sections in the academy, which were then called "specialised academies". Four academics were appointed to each section:

Academy of Natural Sciences

- Josif Pančić
- Dimitrije Nešić
- Jovan Žujović
- Ljubomir Klerić

Academy of Philosophy

- Stojan Novaković
- Milan Kujundžić Aberdar
- Svetislav Vulović
- Svetomir Nikolajević

Academy of Social Sciences

- Čedomilj Mijatović
- Milan Đ. Milićević
- Ljubomir Kovačević
- Panta Srećković

Academy of Arts

- Ljubomir Nenadović
- Matija Ban
- Mihailo Valtrović
- Davorin Jenko

== Departments ==
- Department of Mathematics, Physics and Geo Sciences
- Department of Chemical and Biological Sciences
- Department of Technical Sciences
- Department of Medical Sciences
- Department of Languages and Literature
- Department of Social Sciences
- Department of Historical Sciences
- Department of Arts

== Institutes ==
- Institute for Balkan Studies
- Institute for Byzantine Studies
- Geographical Institute "Jovan Cvijić"
- Ethnographical Institute
- Institute for the Serbian Language
- Institute of Technical Sciences
- Mathematical Institute
- Institute of Musicology

== Building ==
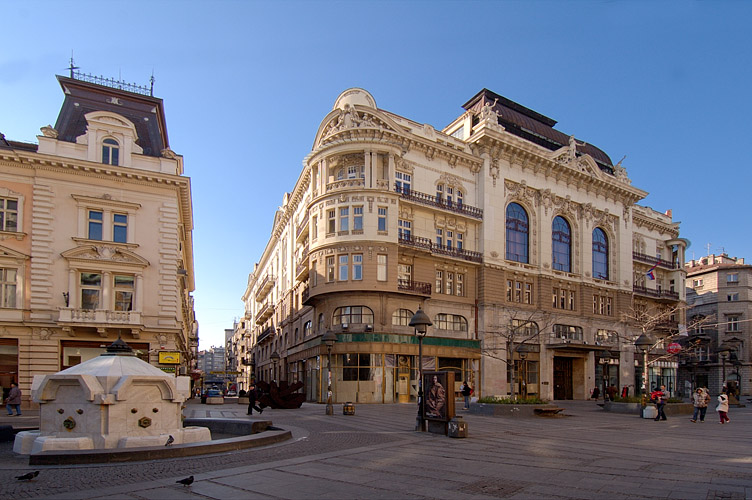
The SANU building, completed in 1924.

From 1909 till 1952 Serbian Academy of Science and Arts Building was located at 15 Brankova Street. This building was demolished in 1963. After that the Academy was moved to 35 Knez Mihailova Street, in a magnificent building in the city centre, where it has remained up to now. Serbian Academy of Science and Arts (SASA), the highest scientific institution in Serbia, has been decorating Knez Mihailova Street for almost one century, bringing the spirit of French decorations and Art Nouveau in the architecture of Belgrade.

The sketches, proposals and designs for the construction of this magnificent building were created from the first day of its founding in 1886; however, the Academy did not move in the building until 1886. Right after the founding of the Academy, the erection of the building was considered at the representative location in Knez Мihailova Street, which Prince Mihailo Obrenović III donated for educational cause.

Considering the fact that apart from the plot Serbian Royal Academy (SRA) had no other financial resources, the erection of the temporary ground-floor building was considered until the conditions are fulfilled for the construction of the representative object in which two important national institutions were supposed to be located: The Serbian Country Museum and The National Library. In the following years SRA considered various ways of forming funds and acquiring financial resources for the construction of its building. The mutual fund of SRA, National Library and The Serbian Country Museum was formed in 1896 by the King's Decree, so that with the initial capital and its own plot, the Academy was able to begin solving the construction problem.

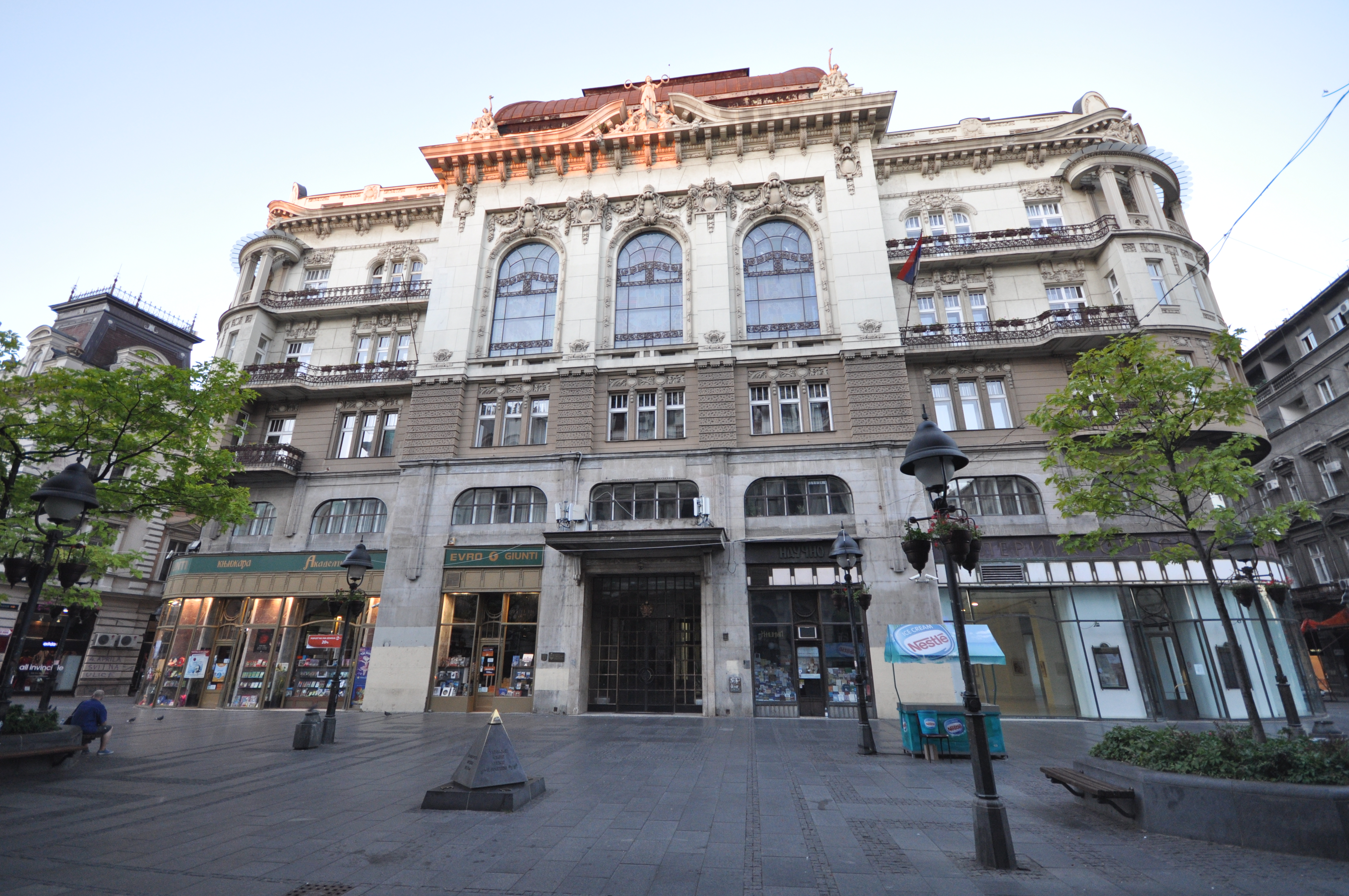
The SANU building in Knez Mihailova Street, Belgrade

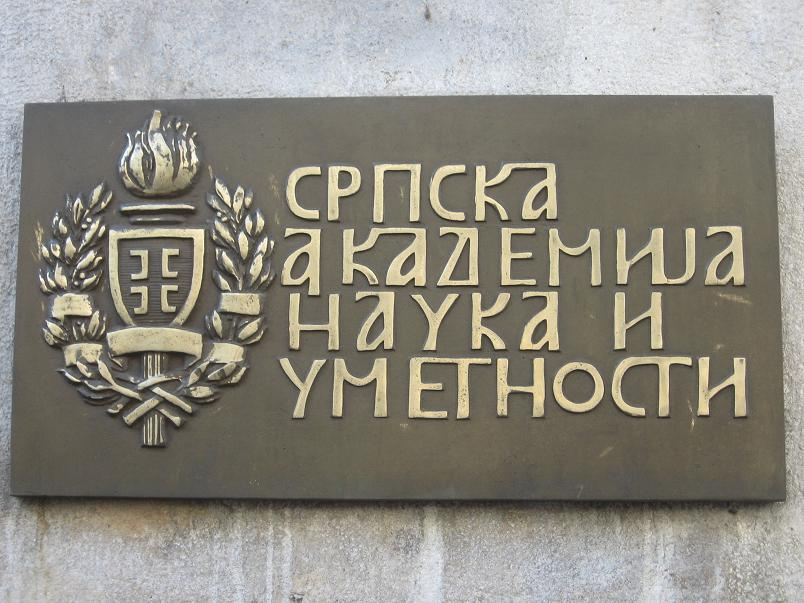
SANU logo

Affirmed architect of domestic architecture Кonstantin Jovanović was hired to make the design in 1900. It was the first project in a row which remained unrealized: starting from the plea to eminent architectures Аndra Stevanović, Nikola Nestorović, Milan Kapetanović and Dragutin Đorđević, to make the preliminary designs, through the unsuccessful announcement of the public competition, until the attempt to form the project resembling the building of Yugoslav Academy of Science and Arts from Zagreb and new designs of an architect Konstantin Jovanović. At the same time, with the attempts to obtain the adequate design, the interest of the three institutions for the construction of the common building was not constant. Dealing with the problem of permanent location, in 1908 SRA got to use the space in the building of Sima Igumanović endowment at 15 Brankova Street. After more than two decades of attempting to obtain its own building, the Presidency of SRA, by the end of 1910 decided to entrust the design to Dragutin Đorđević and Andra Stevanović. The cornerstone was laid on 27 March 1914, by the Crown Prince Aleksandar Karađorđević in the presence of the academics and the Ministers of Construction and Education. The construction works were assigned to the Matija Bleh's company, whereas the facade plastics and sculptural program were done by Jungmann and Sunko. However, the construction was interrupted by the beginning of the First World War.

The object was finished in 1924, but due to high construction expenses, SRA failed to move into its new building; instead of that, the entire object was rented. Believing that the design of the SRA building was supposed to transfer the advanced ideas, architects Stevanović and Đorđević created the design which did not rely on the previous designs in terms of its spatial and functional composition. Large sized building, which takes over the entire plot, was designed with the apartments and stores for rent and with richly оrnamented Art Nouveau decorated passages. In dealing with the facades, the authors did not completely abandoned the academic models of designing; they modernized one symmetrical, three-part division of facade canvas by introducing rounded corners, additionally emphasized with semi-circular bay windows. By introducing Art Nouveau elements in the form of three-part windows, of the аrabesque secondary plastic, modern designed details on the shop windows on the ground floor and the mezzanine, with the elements of French decorations, the authors achieved the luxurious facade program. The architectural plastic in the shape of floral arabesques, garlands and Art Nouveau masks, got a new dimension in the attic in the form of full sculpture of the symbolic meaning. The central motif of the main facade is the sculpture composition The Goddess Nika joining the trade and industry, whereas almost identical sculptural compositions The woman with the children were placed on the corners of the central protruding bay. One of those female sculptures is holding a torch in her hand, and the other one a pigeon. The identical compositions of children sculptures were placed in the attics above the corners of the building and along the side facades, creating one of the richest sculptural programs of Belgrade architecture before the First World War. SRA was in the rented building in Brankova Street when the Second World War ended.

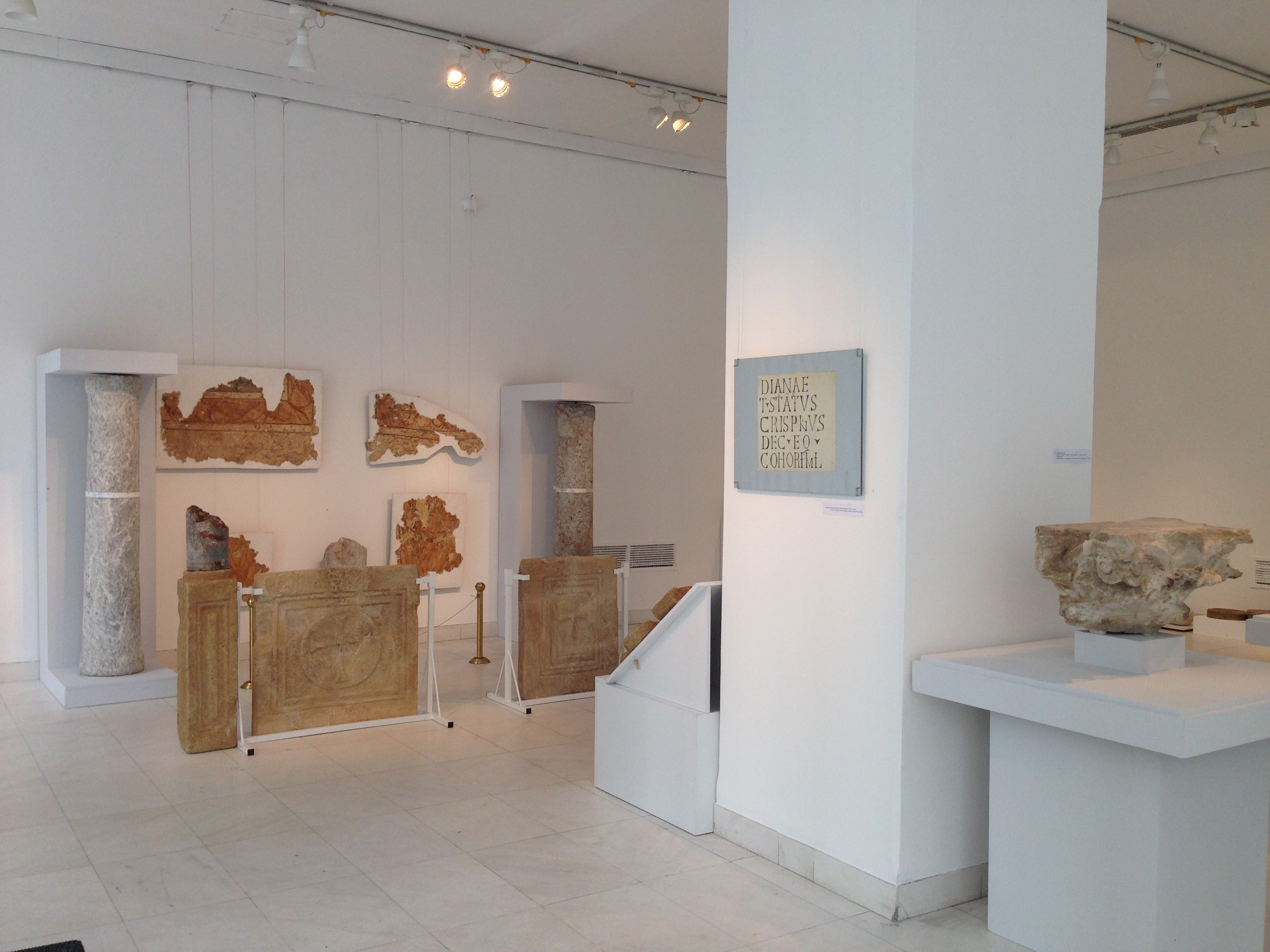
Gallery of the Serbian Academy of Arts and Sciences

Right after the end of the Second World War, in 1947 The Law on Serbian Academy of Science brought certain changes in its structure, when instead of the expert academies, six departments were formed as well as the certain number of the institutes. With the enlarged spectre of activities, the need for the necessary spatial capacities increased significantly, so the primary goal was the conversion of the entire building in Knez Mihailova Street into the office space, which included an extensive adaptation. The design was assigned to an architect Grigorij Samojlov, who, along with an architect Đorđe Smiljanić completed the transformation of the inner part of the building, at the same time completing one of the most important interior designs. Samojlov showed extraordinary skill by reshaping the existing object into the almost compact academic combination with central atrium, he formed a two-tract office system, completely eliminated the passages, except for the central one, which was partially redesigned into the main entrance hall, whereas the ground floor kept its commercial character. The creation of the entrance from Knez Mihailova Street and designing of the access to the conference hall contributed to the realization of the representative space. According to the new concept, Samojlov designed the exterior in the modernized academic style with purified geometrized decorative repertoire. At the same time, the Congress hall was adapted, gaining the gallery and in the arched niches two paintings "The Science", painted by Petar Lubarda and "The Art", painted by Мilo Milunović. Along with the adaptation certain changes were made on the very facade: the glass marquise was removed from the mezzanine, the mezzanine windows were changed, as well as the shop windows on the ground floor, a decorative dome was reconstructed and a cornice and all decorative elements were removed.

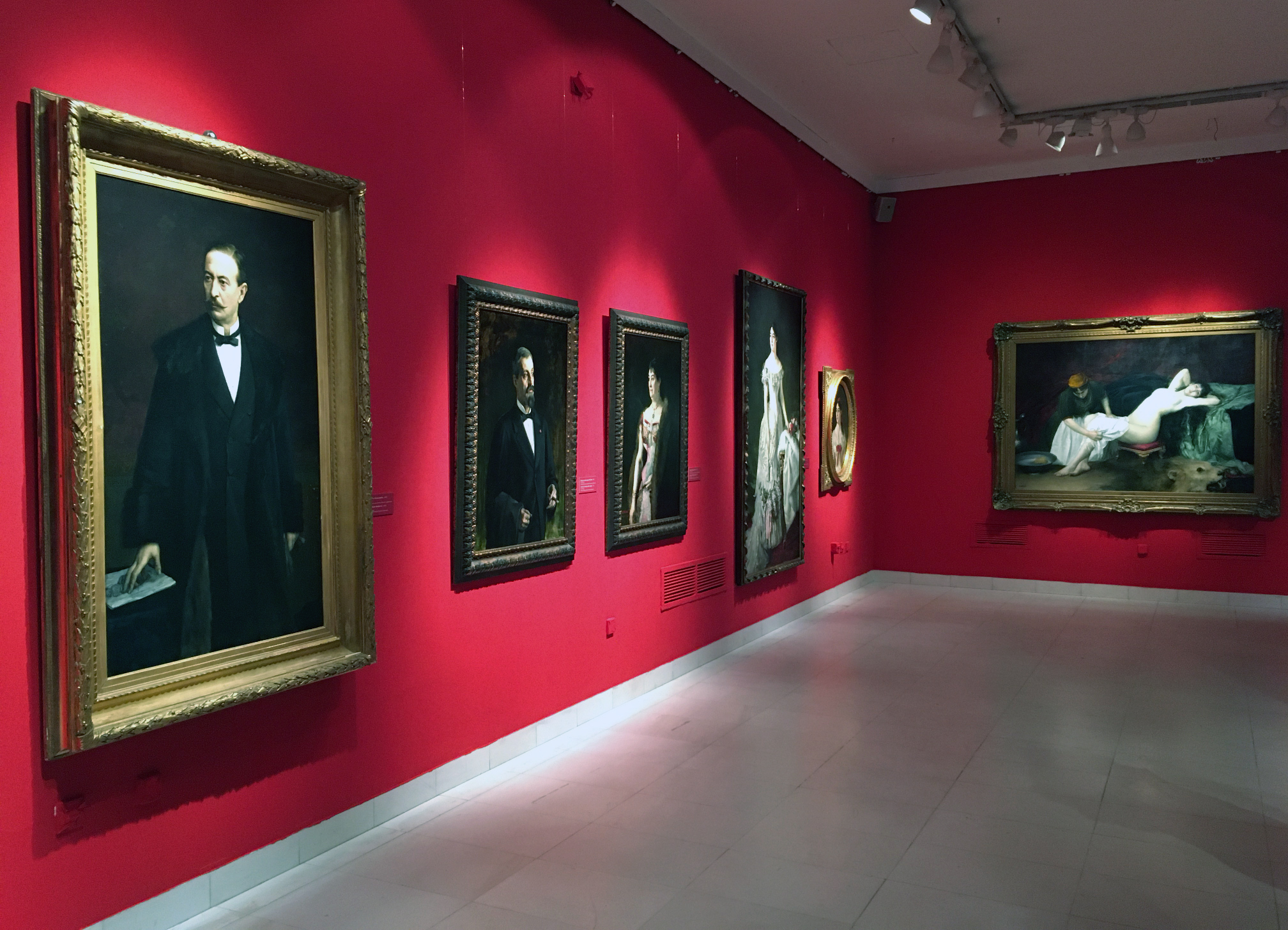
Gallery of the Serbian Academy of Arts and Sciences, exhibition of artworks by Vlaho Bukovac

The building was officially and solemnly opened on 24 February 1952, when the Academy finally and permanently moved in into the building. In 1967, Samojlov did the design for the adaptation of the gallery on the corner of Knez Mihailova and Vuka Karadžića streets. Perfectly composed interior left room for additional improvement during the next couple of years, so that until today it has been enriched by our eminent artists. The glass gaps of the final collimation line in the entrance hall were replaced by the stained glass done in 2000, after the drawings by Branko Miljuš, whereas the stained glass windows in the Congress Hall and in the foyer in front of the hall were made after the design of the academic Mladen Srbinović in 2005. Serbian Academy of Science and Arts, as the most significant scientific institution in Serbia, gave the biggest contribution to the improvement of the scientific thought, gathering many prominent names of Serbian, Yugoslav and world science and artistic creation. Its building, built at one of the most representative locations of Belgrade urban space, with its architecture makes the inevitable part of the evaluation of, not only local, but also national construction heritage for almost one century. Taking into consideration the undeniable values and the importance, it was designated as a cultural monument in 1992.

A complete reconstruction of the exterior and interior was announced in 2020, with the goal being to complete the works in 2024 and make space for a new concert hall.

== Electoral assemblies ==
New members of the Academy are elected on the electoral assemblies, which have been held every third year since 1985.

In order to make room for academics from a wider field of arts, "Department of Fine Arts and Music" was renamed to "Department of Arts" in 2021, which was the first major organisational change in the Academy after a number of years.

== List of presidents ==
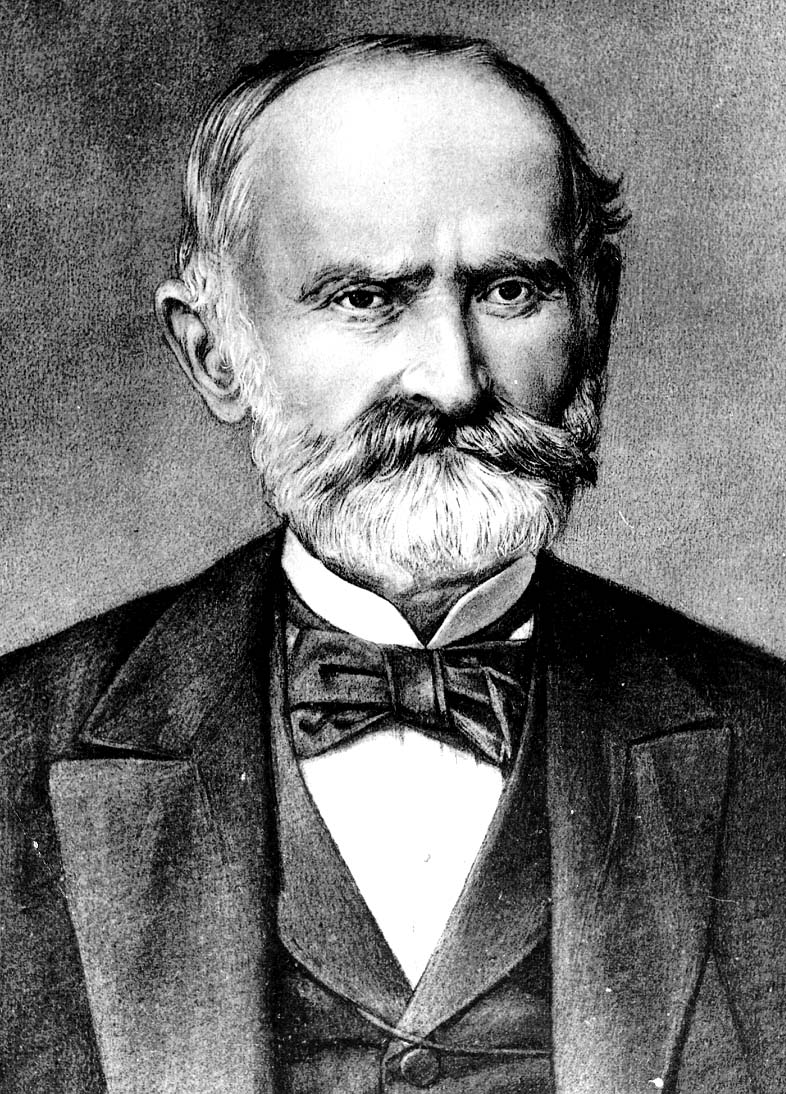
Josif Pančić, first President of the Serbian Academy of Sciences and Arts (1887–1888)

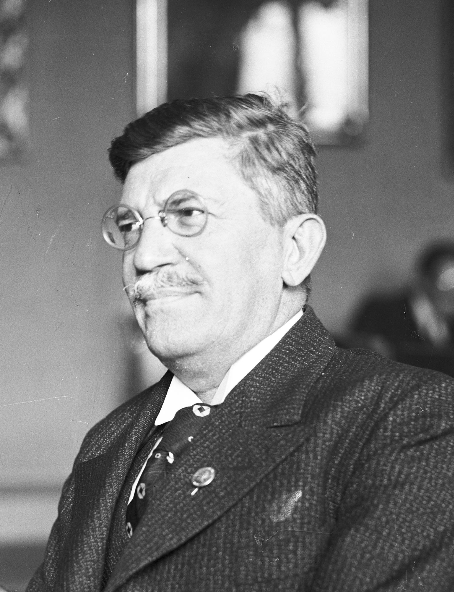
Aleksandar Belić, longest-serving President of the Serbian Academy of Sciences and Arts (1937–1960)

Name	Period
Josif Pančić	1887–1888
Čedomilj Mijatović	1888–1889
Dimitrije Nešić	1892–1895
Milan Đ. Milićević	1896–1899
Jovan Ristić	1899
Sima Lozanić	1899–1900
Jovan Mišković	1900–1903
Sima Lozanić	1903–1906
Stojan Novaković	1906–1915
Jovan Žujović	1915–1921
Jovan Cvijić	1921–1927
Slobodan Jovanović	1928–1931
Bogdan Gavrilović	1931–1937
Aleksandar Belić	1937–1960
Ilija Đuričić	1960–1965
Velibor Gligorić	1965–1971
Pavle Savić	1971–1981
Dušan Kanazir	1981–1994
Aleksandar Despić	1994–1998
Dejan Medaković	1998–2003
Nikola Hajdin	2003–2015
Vladimir S. Kostić	2015–2023
Zoran Knežević	2023–present

== List of Nobel laureates ==
There have been 20 members of the Serbian Academy of Sciences and Arts who were honoured with the Nobel Prize.

=== Full members ===
Laureate	Image	Year	Category	Rationale
Leopold Ružička		1939	Chemistry	"for his work on polymethylenes and higher terpenes."
Ivo Andrić		1961	Literature	"for the epic force with which he has traced themes and depicted human destinies drawn from the history of his country."

=== Foreign members ===
Laureate	Image	Year	Category	Rationale
Theodor Mommsen		1902	Literature	"the greatest living master of the art of historical writing, with special reference to his monumental work, A history of Rome."
Henryk Sienkiewicz		1905	Literature	"because of his outstanding merits as an epic writer."
Glenn T. Seaborg		1951	Chemistry	"for their discoveries in the chemistry of the transuranium elements."
Selman Waksman		1952	Physiology or Medicine	"for his discovery of streptomycin, the first antibiotic effective against tuberculosis."
Mikhail Sholokhov		1965	Literature	"for the artistic power and integrity with which, in his epic of the Don, he has given expression to a historic phase in the life of the Russian people."
René Cassin		1968	Peace	"President of the European Court of Human Rights."
Derek Barton		1969	Chemistry	"for their contributions to the development of the concept of conformation and its application in chemistry."
Aleksandr Solzhenitsyn		1970	Literature	"for the ethical force with which he has pursued the indispensable traditions of Russian literature."
Pyotr Kapitsa		1975	Physics	"for his basic inventions and discoveries in the area of low-temperature physics."
Vladimir Prelog		1975	Chemistry	"for his research into the stereochemistry of organic molecules and reactions."
Roger Guillemin		1977	Physiology or Medicine	"for their discoveries concerning the peptide hormone production of the brain."
Czesław Miłosz		1980	Literature	"who with uncompromising clear-sightedness voices man's exposed condition in a world of severe conflicts."
Torsten Wiesel		1981	Physiology or Medicine	"for their discoveries concerning information processing in the visual system."
Yevgeniy Chazov		1985	Peace	Member of the International Physicians for the Prevention of Nuclear War
Stanley B. Prusiner		1997	Physiology or Medicine	"for his discovery of Prions - a new biological principle of infection."
Paul Greengard		2000	Physiology or Medicine	"for their discoveries concerning signal transduction in the nervous system."
Harold Pinter		2005	Literature	"who in his plays uncovers the precipice under everyday prattle and forces entry into oppression's closed rooms."
Peter Handke		2019	Literature	"for an influential work that with linguistic ingenuity has explored the periphery and the specificity of human experience."

== List of Pulitzer laureates ==
=== Full members ===
Laureate	Image	Year	Category	Work
Mihajlo Pupin		1924	Biography or Autobiography	From Immigrant to Inventor

== See also ==
- List of SANU members
- Vojvodina Academy of Sciences and Arts
- Institute for Balkan Studies
- Memorandum of the Serbian Academy of Sciences and Arts
- Academy of Sciences and Arts of the Republika Srpska
- Archives of Sremski Karlovci
