= Serbian literature =

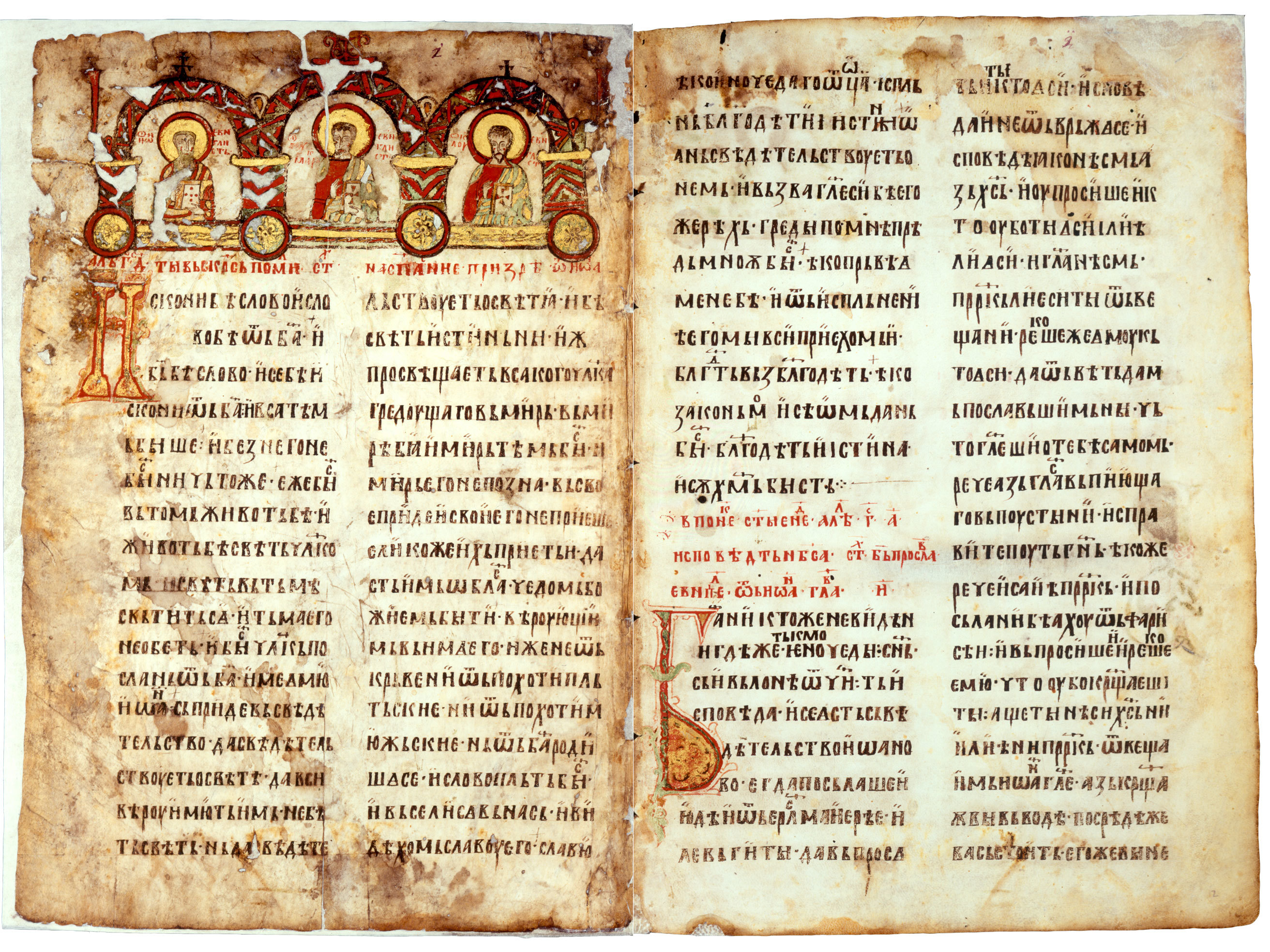
Miroslav's Gospel (1186), one of oldest Serbian Cyrillic and Language Codex, is a part of UNESCO's Memory of the World Register

Serbian literature (Serbian Cyrillic: Српска књижевност, Srpska književnost), refers to literature written in Serbian and/or in Serbia and all other lands where Serbs reside.

The history of Serbian literature begins with the independent works from the Nemanjić dynasty era, if not before. With the fall of Serbia and neighboring countries in the 15th century, there is a gap in the literary history in the occupied land. Serbian literature, however, continued uninterrupted in Serbian-inhabited lands under European rule and saw a revival with Baroque works published in the 18th century in what is today Vojvodina. Serbia gained independence following the Serbian Revolution (1804–1815) and Serbian literature has since prospered. Several Serbian writers have achieved international fame.

== Medieval and post-medieval literature ==
The King of Serbia Stefan Nemanja Serbian Orthodox Hilandar founding Charter dates from 1198, which is half a century earlier than the first charter of any kind among Germans (1238/9), and just a little later than first such document in Christian Spain and southern France. Its oldest known Serbian Cyrillic and Language Christian monastery foundation charter.

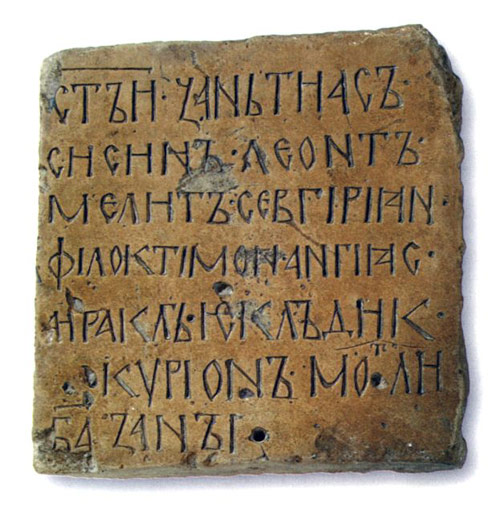
Temnić inscription, 10th-11th century

=== Medieval ===
Old Church Slavonic literature was created based on the Byzantine model since the time of Constantine the Great, to be exact. At first, church services and biblical texts were translated into Slavic, and soon afterward other works about Christian life values including works in Latin from which they attained necessary knowledge in various fields. Although Christian literature educated the Slavs, it did not have an overwhelming influence on original works. Instead, a more narrow aspect, the genres, and poetics with which the cult of saints could be celebrated were used, owing to the Slavic celebration of Cyril and Methodius and their Slav disciples as saints and those responsible for Slavic literacy. The ritual genres were hagiographies, homiletics and hymnography, known in Slavic as žitije (vita), pohvala (eulogy), službe (church services), effectively meaning prose, rhetoric, and poetry. The fact that the first Slavic works were in the canonical form of ritual literature, and that the literary language was the ritual Slavic language, defined further development. Medieval Slavic literature, especially Serbian, was modeled on this classical Slavic literature. The new themes in Serbian literature were all created within the classic ritual genres.

Serbian medieval literature is very rich with around 500 separate genres. Medieval works are mostly a mix of history, legal theory, theology, writing, and philology. While there were several works of poetry written in Serbian literature in the Middle Ages, there are only a few dramas; published novels were mostly adaptations and translations. The earliest writings in Serbian were religious works. Religions were historically the first institutions that persisted despite political and military upheavals. They were the first organizations to see the value in recording in writing their history and policies. Serbia's early religious documents date back to the 10th and 11th centuries. In the 12th century, Saint Sava developed the art form of religious writing. He worked to bring about an artistic aspect to these writings, also based on earlier works.

Notable medieval authors include among others: Saint Sava, Jefimija, Stefan Lazarević and Constantine of Kostenets.

This period has produced several great works by authors which have since become classics of the national literature.

Medieval literature has also influenced several modern poets, such as Desanka Maksimović, Miodrag Pavlović, Vasko Popa, and Matija Bećković.

=== Post-medieval ===
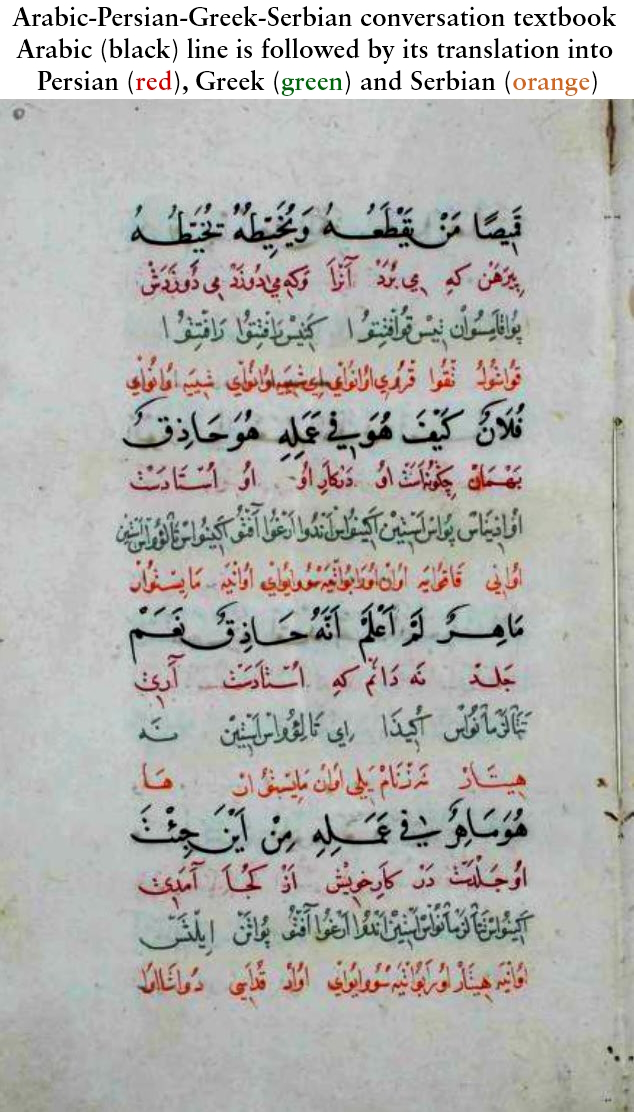
Arabic-Persian-Greek-Serbian Conversation Textbook, one of the oldest Serbian dictionaries, 15th century

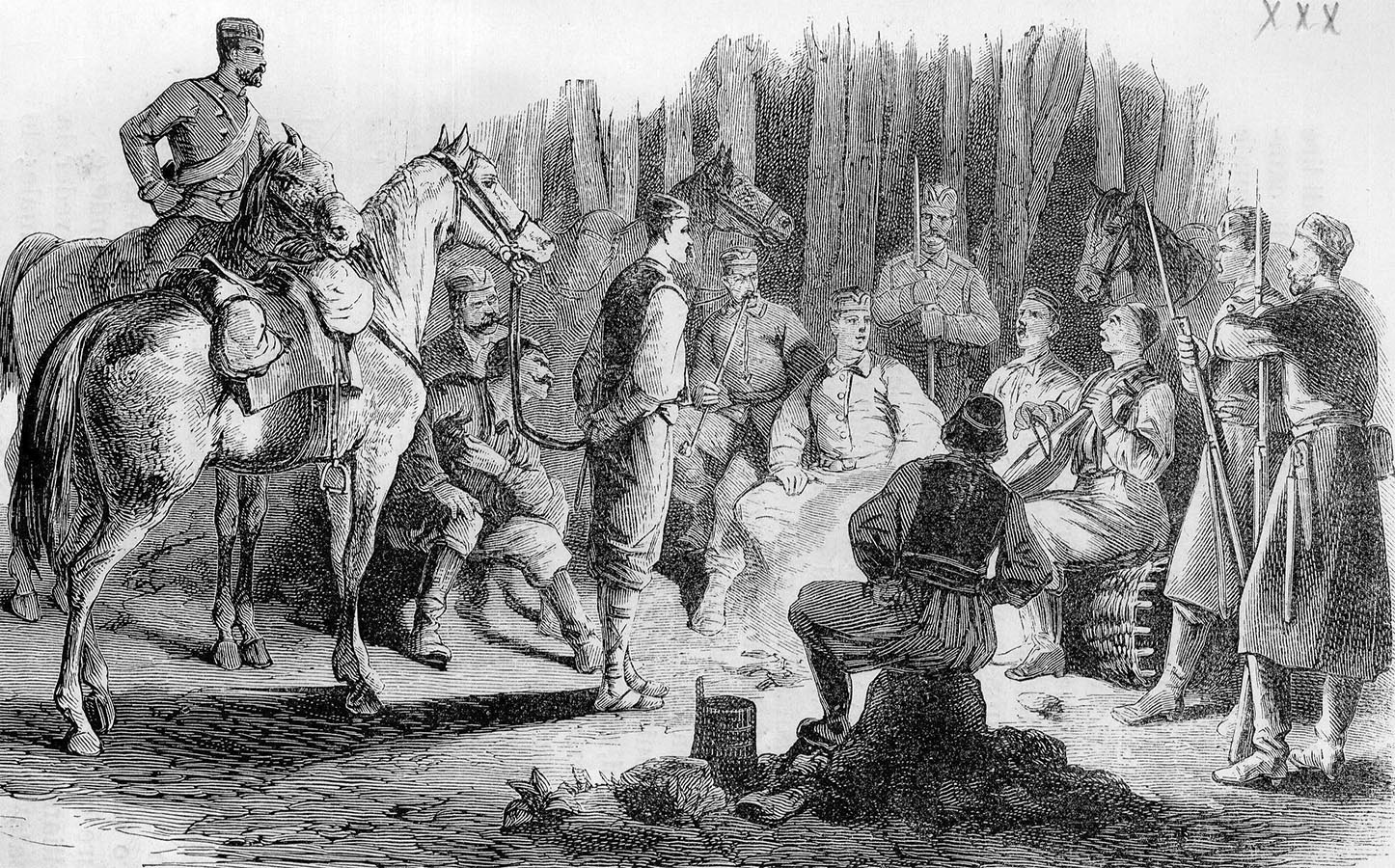
Serbian epic poetry was an important art form during the foreign occupation of Serbia. It was also studied by the likes of Herder, Jacob Grimm and Goethe.

Folk songs and epics passed from generation to generation orally dominated Post-medieval Serbian literature. Historic events, such as the Battle of Kosovo in the 14th century, play a major role in the development of Serbian epic poetry.

Works of epic poetry are considered the best Serbian folk literature, and are a key component in Serbian national consciousness, identity and mentality. The influence of epic poetry continued even after the poems were written and printed. Among others, noted gusle players and authors of epic poetry are, Old man Raško, Blind Živana, Tešan Podrugović and Blind Jeca. and others.

The oldest known, entirely fictional poems, make up the "Non-historic Cycle". They are followed by poems inspired by events before, during, and after the Battle of Kosovo. The special cycles are dedicated to Serbian legendary hero, Marko Kraljević, then about hajduks (infantry) and uskoks (soldiers), and the liberation of Serbia in the 19th century. Some of the best known folk ballads are The Death of the Mother of the Jugović Family and The Mourning Song of the Noble Wife of the Asan Aga (Hasanaginica) (1646), translated into European languages by Goethe, Walter Scott, Pushkin and Mérimée. One of the most notable tales from Serbian folklore is "The Nine Peahens and the Golden Apples".

During the period of the Ottoman occupation of Serbia, several printing houses were active, including Crnojević printing house, Vuković printing house, Goražde printing house and the Belgrade printing house mostly active outside modern-day Serbia and in Venice. These printing houses and individual publishers were the only sources of books in Serbian during the period without the national state.

== Baroque, Enlightenment and Classicism ==
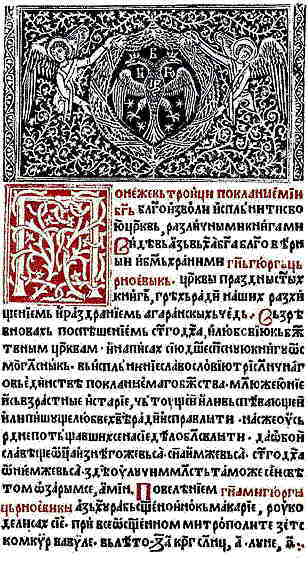
Crnojević printing house, first Serbian Cyrillic and Language printing house, Venice, 1493

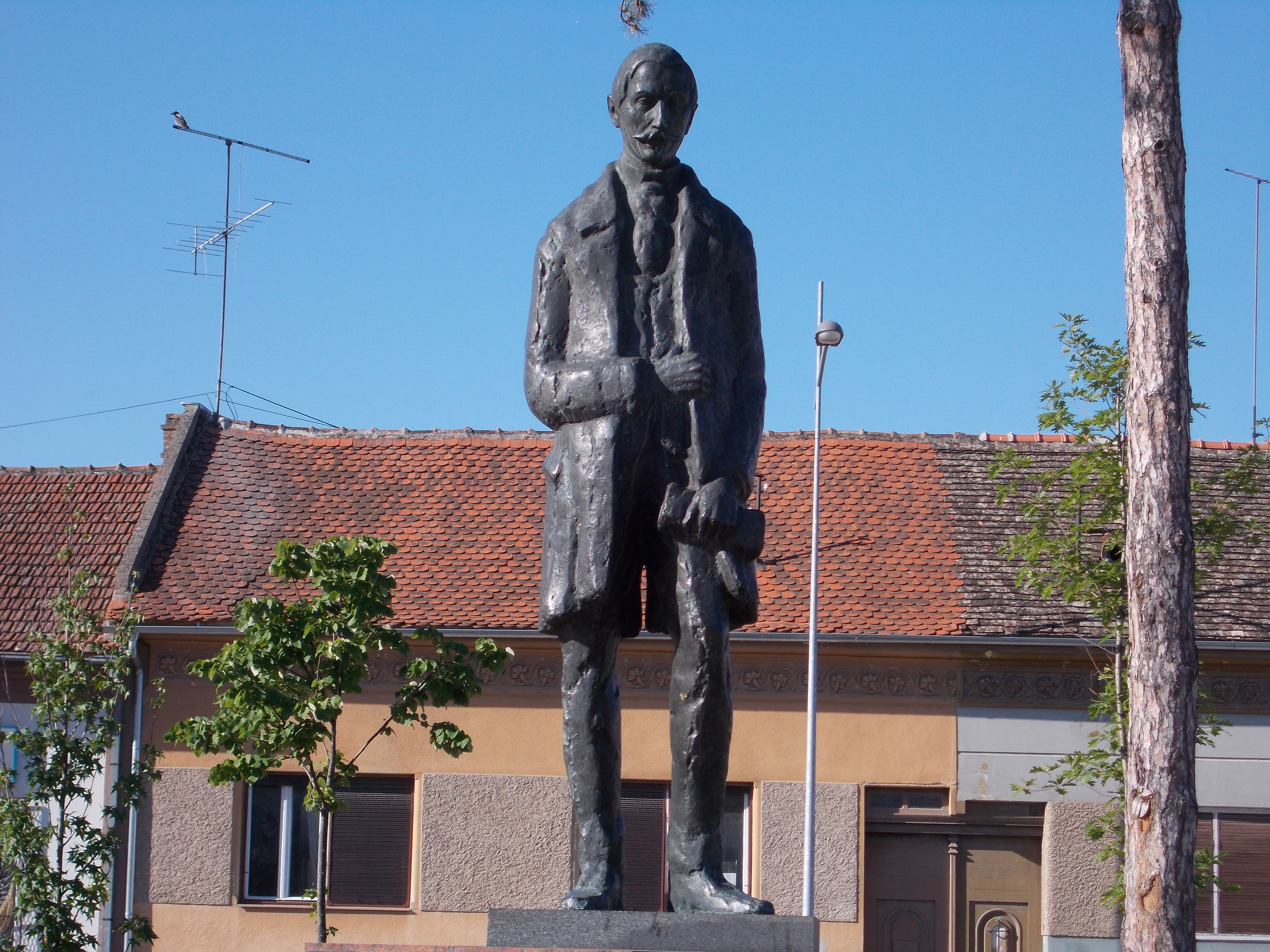
Statue of playwright and cultural worker Jovan Sterija Popović

Serbian literature in Vojvodina continued building on Medieval tradition, influenced by Old Serbian and Russian baroque, which culminated in the Slavonic-Serbian language. Baroque has an important place in Serbian literature which had been interrupted by the Ottoman invasion. It was reestablished and became prominent again.

A notable Baroque writer from this period is Gavril Stefanović Venclović, who wrote numerous works in several genres and started an early reform of the language. Other important authors of the time include: Dimitrije Ljubavić, Đorđe Branković, Andrija Zmajević, Vasilije III Petrović-Njegoš, Mojsije Putnik, Pavle Julinac, Marko Jelisejić, Joakim Vujić, Luka Milovanov Georgijević, Nikanor Grujić, Jovan Subotić, Jovan Rajić, Zaharije Orfelin, Simeon Piščević, Gerasim Zelić and others.

Having no institutions of their own during the foreign occupation, Serbs invited Russian authors and educators to help with the education of the nation. The influx of these authors made poems rather than prose more prominent. Drama and theatre began as well. A gymnasium (school) in modern-day Sremski Karlovci was a center of culture for several years in the 18th century headed by Emanuel Kozačinski who wrote a notable Baroque work Traedokomedija in 1734.

During the Age of Enlightenment a new cultural model was formed, accompanied by the historical reforms undertaken by Maria Theresa. Authors of the Enlightenment include Dositej Obradović, Atanasije Stojković, Jevstatije Mihajlović and Atanasije Nikolić. The Serbian Enlightenment did not produce a work of note on a European scale for obvious political, cultural and religious reasons, though it spanned every artistic field. The most important work of this period is considered to be Život i priključenija (lit. 'Life and Connections') by Dositej Obradović.

Classicism was introduced with the poems of Aleksije Vezilić, who also advocated the core values of the Age of Enlightenment. The most notable dramatist of the period was Jovan Sterija Popović, although his works contain elements of Romanticism, while the best-known Serbian classicist poet and the founder of the first Serbian poetry movement was Lukijan Mušicki.

== Romanticism and Realism ==
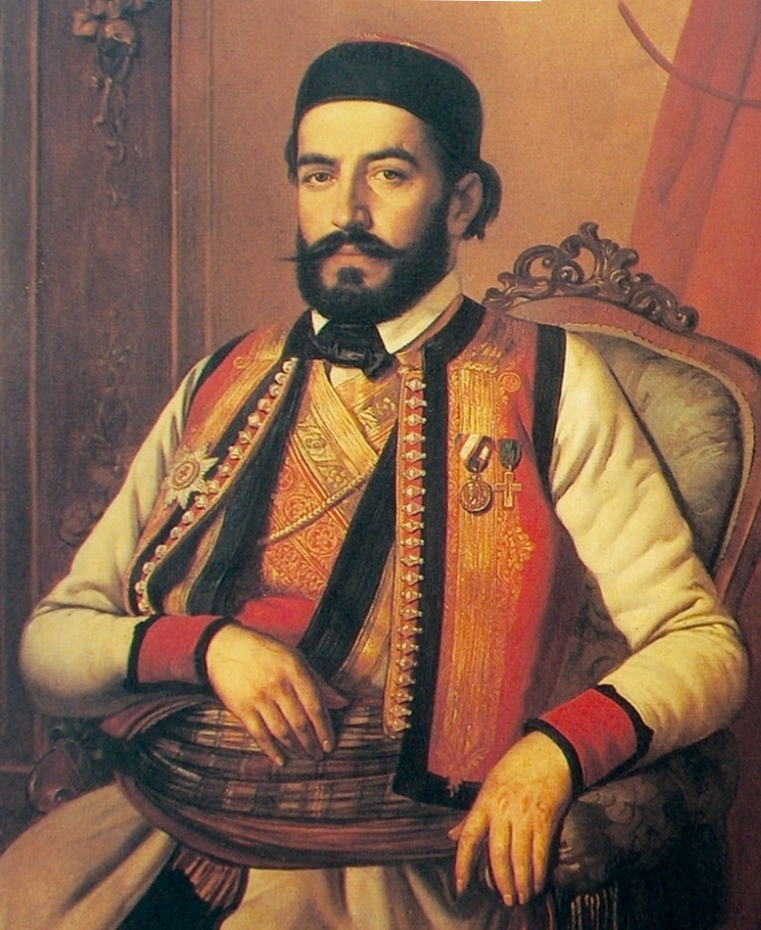
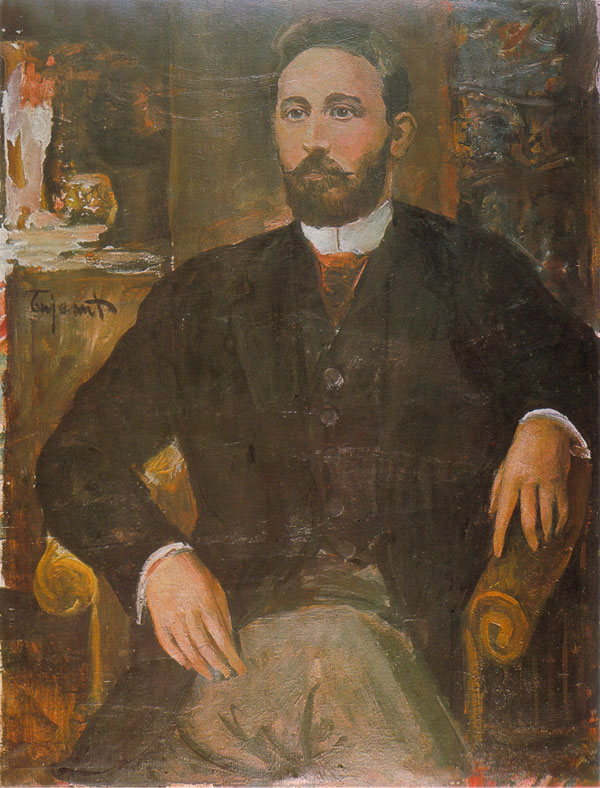
Left:Petar II Petrović-Njegoš is the national poet and a noted author of the Romanticsm
Right: Petar Kočić was a Realist writer and activist

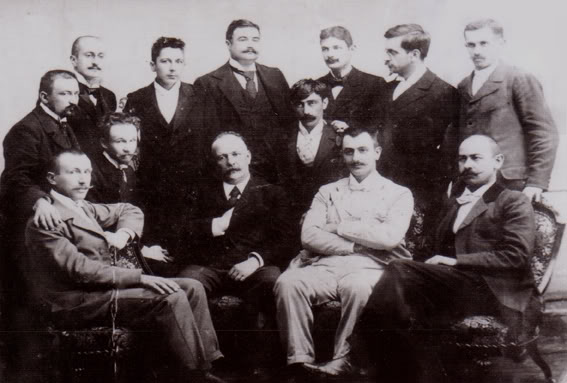
Members of the Serbian poetic circle, noted writers of the 19th and early 20th century. Sitting down: Svetozar Ćorović, Simo Matavulj, Aleksa Šantić and Janko Veselinović. II row: Slobodan Jovanović (left). Standing: Milorad Pavlović-Krpa, Radoje Domanović, and Jovan Skerlić.

Before the start of a fully established Romanticism concomitant with the Revolutions of 1848, some Romanticist ideas (e.g. the use of national language to rally for national unification of all classes) were developing, especially among monastic clergy in Vojvodina.

After winning independence from the Ottoman Empire, the Serbian independence movement sparked the first works of modern Serbian literature. Most notably Petar II Petrović Njegoš and his poem Mountain Wreath of 1847, represent a cornerstone of the Serbian epic, based on the rhythms of the Serbian epic poetry and the works by Homer.

Vuk Stefanović Karadžić, an acquaintance of J. W. von Goethe and Leopold von Ranke, became the first person to collect and publish folk songs and epics in book form. Vuk Karadžić is regarded as the premier Serbian philologist, who together with Đuro Daničić, played a major role in reforming the modern Serbian language and alphabet. Following the language reforms made by Karadžić, several authors like Sima Milutinović Sarajlija and Matija Nenadović published their works, which influenced other authors.

Branko Radičević was the initiator of Romantic poetry. He rejected the classicist norms, and objectivism, and focused on expressing direct experience and feelings in his art. Poems Đački rastanak (lit. 'Student parting') and Tuga i opomena (lit. 'Sadness and admonition') are considered his best works. Other noteworthy Romantic authors include Jovan Grčić Milenko, Kosta Trifković, King Nicholas I of Montenegro and Jovan Ilić.

Romanticism is of great importance to Serbian literature. The authors of the epoch had begun using the newly reformed Serbian language and wrote several works which are considered masterpieces of the Serbian literature, such as Đulići uveoci and poetry for children by Jovan Jovanović Zmaj, Santa Maria della Salute by Laza Kostić and several poems by Đura Jakšić. Travelogues by Ljubomir Nenadović introduced a new literary form which emerged in the 19th century.

The main themes of realists were the country's social groups and classes, the differences between the urban and rural population and exploration of various types of characters. Realism began developing alongside romanticism, as Jakov Ignjatović and Stefan Mitrov Ljubiša published their works.

Svetozar Ćorović depicted his native Herzegovina, where the shift in the Moslem population during the Bosnian crisis and after was most acute. Simo Matavulj and Ivo Ćipiko penned a landscape of the south Adriatic, not always sunny and blue. Ćipiko's lyrical writings warned the reader of deteriorating social conditions, especially The Spiders. Notable realistic authors include Janko Veselinović, Laza Lazarević, Milovan Glišić, Stevan Sremac, Radoje Domanović, Svetolik Ranković, Veljko M. Milićević and Borisav Stanković with his major works, Nečista krv (Impure Blood) and Koštana (lit. 'Bone') (drama). Impure Blood is now considered one of the most powerful Serbian novels of the period. Based in the world of the town of Vranje, this place of merchants and landowners was on its way out together with the Turks retreating from the region, after the long struggle for Old Serbia from 1903 to 1911 and the Balkan Wars. Petar Kočić is well known for highly lyrical prose and the quest for the independence of Bosnia and Herzegovina and its unification with Serbia. In Kočić's play The Badger Before the Court, the Austro-Hungarian authorities are mocked for their proclivity to rule over other nations.

The legacy of Ragusan literature influenced Serbian literature, especially thanks to the members of the Serb-Catholic movement in Dubrovnik, such as Matija Ban, Vid Vuletić Vukasović and Ivo Vojnović.

The only notable poet of the period was Vojislav Ilić. His poems are not purely realistic but mostly post-romantic, although they share several important elements with other realist works. Chief comedy and drama author was Branislav Nušić, who enjoyed popularity in Serbia and the wider region. New literary genres were explored during this period. Lazar Komarčić became a pioneer SF writer.

== Modern literature ==
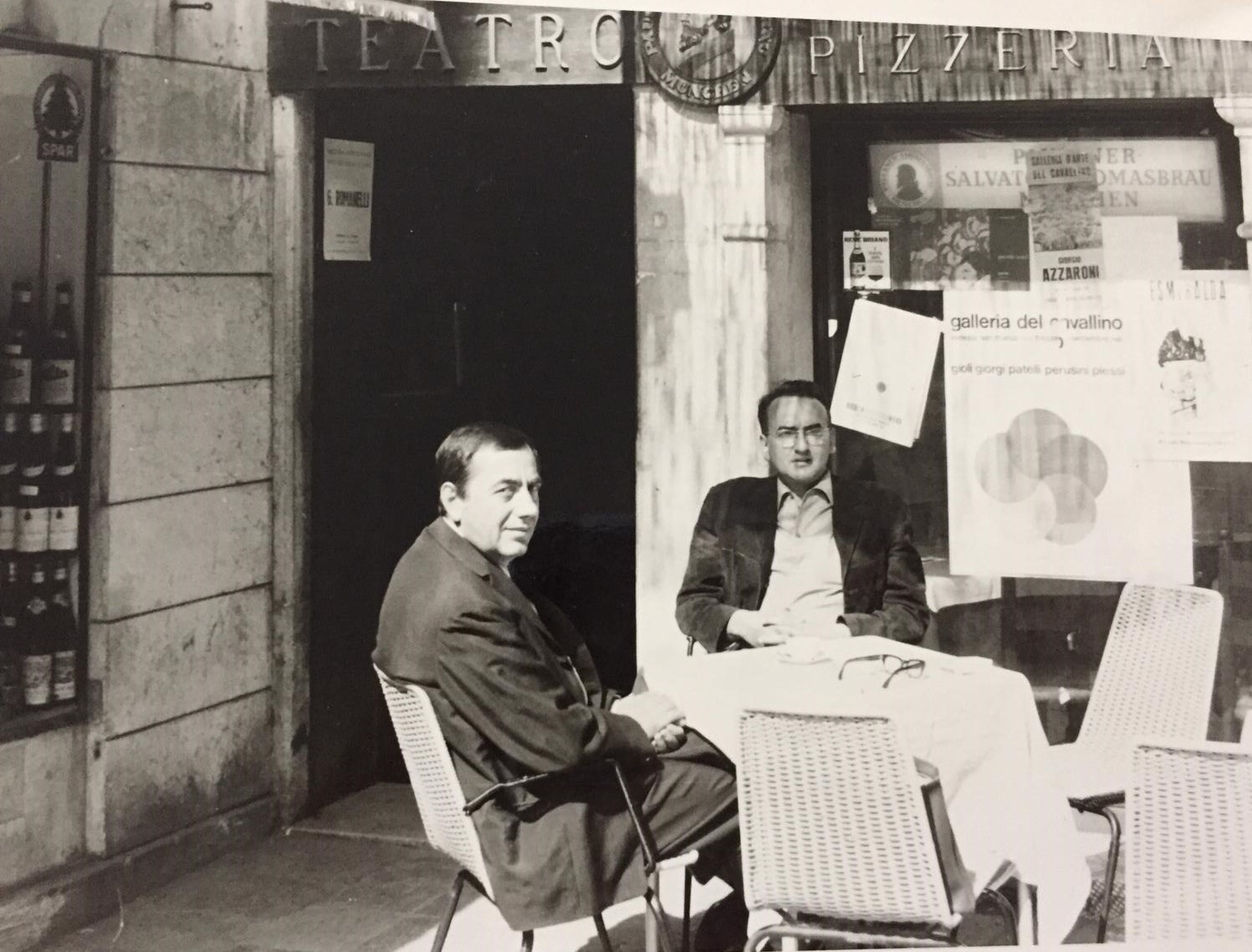
Poets Miodrag Pavlović and Vasko Popa

The literary trend of the first and second decades of the 20th century is referred to as Moderna in Serbian. Its influences came from leading literature movements in Europe, particularly that of symbolism and the psychological novel, but more through mood and aesthetic components rather than literary craftsmanship. This was manifested in the works of Jovan Dučić and Milan Rakić, the two poet-diplomats. The third leading poet at the time was Aleksa Šantić, whose poetry was less subtle but filled with pathos, emotion, and sincerity. They were popular for their patriotic, romantic, and social overtones. According to literary historian Petar Milošević, Serbian Moderna has produced several masterful poems, chiefly authored by Vladislav Petković Dis, Jovan Dučić, Milos Perovic, Milan Rakić, Sima Pandurović and the first half of Milutin Bojić's Ode to a Blue Sea Tomb.

Other poets such as Veljko Petrović, Milutin Bojić, Milutin Uskoković, Sima Pandurović, Vladislav Petković Dis, Milorad Mitrović, Vladimir Stanimirović, Danica Marković, Velimir Rajić, Milorad Pavlović-Krpa, Milan Ćurčin and Milorad Petrović Seljančica each took different paths and showed great sophistication and advancement not only in their craft but in their world view as well. Most of them were pessimistic in their outlook, while at the same time patriotic in the wake of turbulent events that were then culminating in the struggle for Old Serbia, the Balkan Wars, and World War I. These writers were backed by Serbian critics educated in the West. For example, Bogdan Popović, Pavle Popović, Ljubomir Nedić, Slobodan Jovanović, Branko Lazarević, Vojislav Jovanović Marambo and Jovan Skerlić. Skerlić, with his chef-d'oeuvre, the historical survey of Serbian literature, and Bogdan Popović, with his refined, Western-schooled aestheticism, not only weighed the writers' achievements but also pointed out the directions of modern world literature to them.

Significant poetry anthologies in Serbian literature which became canonical are: Antologija novije srpske lirike (1911) by Bogdan Popović, Antologija srpske poezije (1956) by Zoran Mišić, and Antologija srpskog pesništva (1964) by Miodrag Pavlović.

In the 20th century, Serbian literature flourished and a myriad of young and talented writers appeared.

Jelena Dimitrijević and Isidora Sekulić are two early 20th-century woman writers. Sekulić mostly wrote essays, which were the best in Serbian literature of the time.

During the Interwar period a number of new literary movements, styles and ideas emerged. Miloš Crnjanski led the movement called Sumatraism, Rade Drainac headed Hypnotism, and Ljubomir Micić began the international movement, Zenitism.

Surrealism lasted for 10 years in Serbian literature with the "Belgrade group" being the leading literary group of the period, headed by Marko Ristić and Koča Popović. Stanislav Vinaver was a noted journalist, polyhistor and author of the avant-garde. Rastko Petrović and Momčilo Nastasijević are considered to be the most notable avant-garde authors.

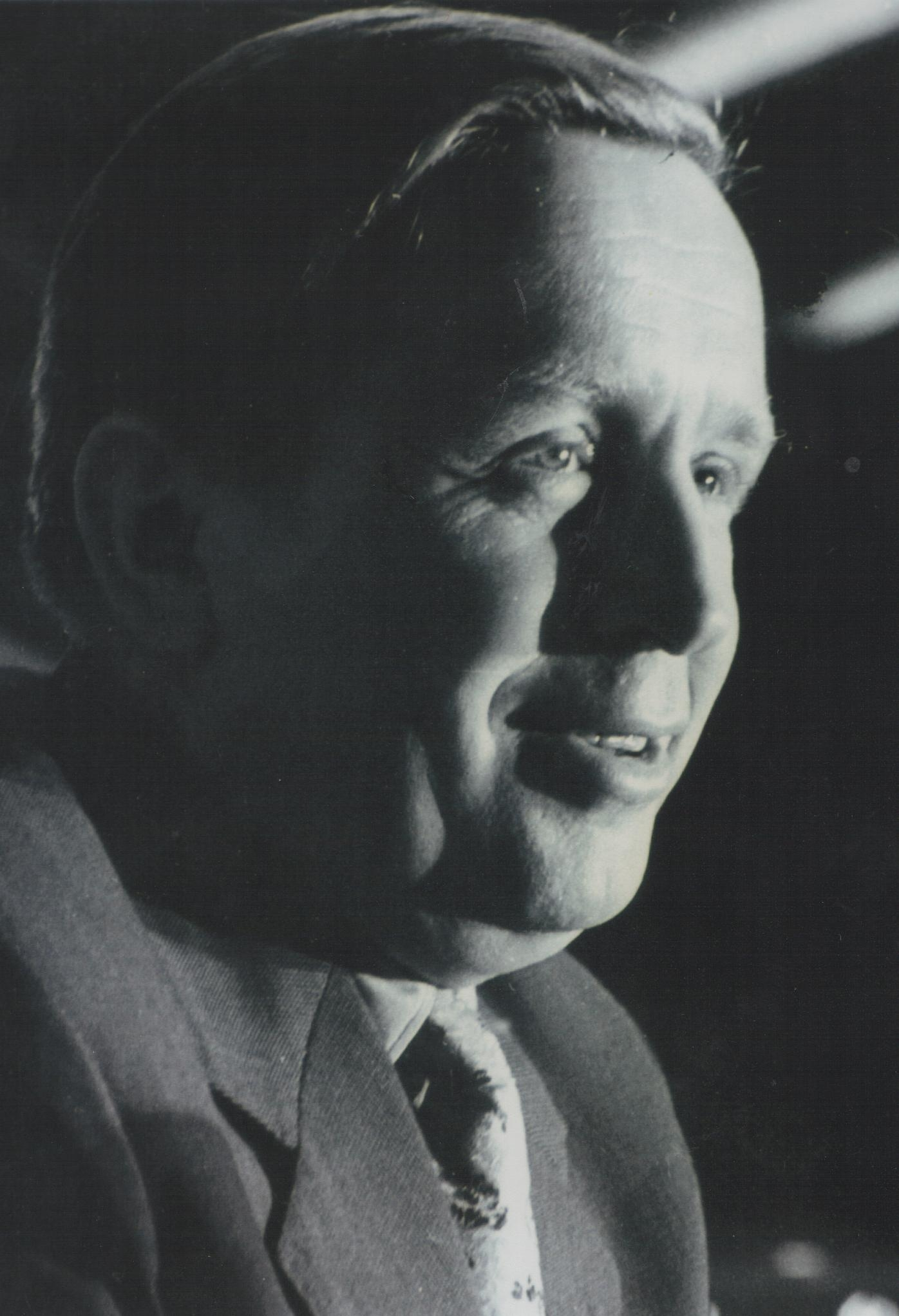
Branko Ćopić is considered to be the favorite writer of Serbian Children's literature

The most well known authors are: Ivo Andrić (he was awarded the Nobel Prize in Literature in 1961), Miloš Crnjanski, Meša Selimović, Vladan Desnica, Oskar Davičo, Borislav Pekić, Branko Miljković, Danilo Kiš, Milorad Pavić, David Albahari, Miodrag Bulatović, Radomir Konstantinović, Mihailo Lalić, Branko Ćopić, Igor Marojević, Miroslav Josić Višnjić and Dobrica Ćosić, among others. Ivo Andrić created a great opus with works set mostly in his native Bosnia and Herzegovina. Crnjanski was an accomplished poet and prose writer. His works like Lament Over Belgrade, Migrations, A novel of London are considered to be the crowning achievements of 20th-century Serbian literature.

The most beloved face of Serbian literature was Desanka Maksimović, who for seven decades remained "the leading lady of Yugoslav poetry".

Socialist realism was dominant in the period between 1945 and 1948. In comparison with other communist states, Yugoslavia's dogmatic form of Socialist realism was short-lived. Several authors of Serbian literature dealt with the more complex life and society and its morals during the Communist period. Some of the notable authors include: Antonije Isaković, Mihailo Lalić, Meša Selimović, Milovan Đilas, Branko Ćopić and Dobrica Ćosić.

Starting with the 1970s, there was a wave of experimental works, "trick novels" and "found manuscripts". Milorad Pavić, Borislav Pekić, Danilo Kiš, Slobodan Selenić, Svetislav Basara, Boško Petrović (writer), Dragan Velikić and Dobrica Ćosić wrote these works.

Miodrag Pavlović was one of the most prominent authors of World literature in the 20th century.

After the death of Josip Broz Tito and the start of a crisis in Yugoslavia, the island of Goli Otok became a new subject in literature. Vanredna linija by Čedo Vuković (1990) and Goli Otok by Dragoslav Mihailović were the prominent works dealing with the topic of Goli otok, which was previously deemed undesirable and controversial as a theme.

Milorad Pavić is one of the most widely acclaimed Serbian authors, most notably for his Dictionary of the Khazars (Хазарски речник / Hazarski rečnik), which has been translated into 38 languages.

== Contemporary ==
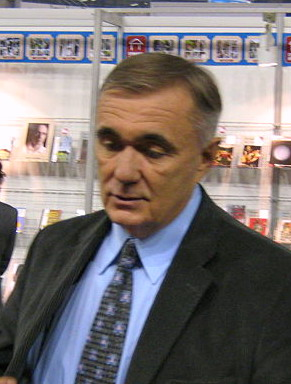
Dušan Kovačević wrote several plays and screenplays which have been praised by both the public and the critics

Dušan Kovačević and Biljana Srbljanović are noted contemporary dramatists.

Ljubomir Simović is one of the chief poets of the second half of the 20th century and early 21st century.

Svetlana Velmar-Janković, Grozdana Olujić and Gordana Kuić are the best known female writers in Serbia today.

Some of the most notable authors include Zoran Živković, Vladimir Arsenijević, Vladislav Bajac, Igor Marojević and Svetislav Basara. Živković's works have been translated into 20 languages and he was awarded World Fantasy Award.

Authors writing in Serbian who have won the European Union Prize for Literature include Jelena Lengold, Uglješa Šajtinac, Darko Tuševljaković, Tanja Stupar-Trifunović and Lana Bastašić.

== Selected works ==
English translations

- Pekić, Borislav, The Time of Miracles, translated by Lovett F. Edwards, Houghton Mifflin Harcourt, 1976
- Andrić, Ivo, The Bridge on the Drina, The University of Chicago Press, 1977
- Pekić, Borislav, The Houses of Belgrade, translated by Bernard Johnson, Houghton Mifflin Harcourt, 1978
- Kiš, Danilo, A Tomb for Boris Davidovich, translated by Duska Mikic-Mitchell, Penguin Books, 1980
- Kiš, Danilo, The Encyclopedia of the Dead, translated by Michael Henry Heim, 1983
- Andrić, Ivo, Damned Yard and Other Stories , edited and translated by Celia Hawkesworth, Dufour Editions, 1992
- Selimović, Meša, Death and the Dervish, translated by Bogdan Rakic and Stephen M. Dickey, Northwestern University Press, 1996
- Pekić, Borislav, How to Quiet a Vampire: A Sotie (Writings from an Unbound Europe), translated by Stephen M. Dickey and Bogdan Rakic, Northwestern University Press, 2005
- Andrić, Ivo, The Days of the Consuls, translated by Celia Hawkesworth, Dereta, 2008
- Bajac, Vladislav. Hamam Balkania, translated by Randall A. Major, Geopoetica Publishing, 2009
- Andrić, Ivo, The Slave Girl and Other Stories, edited and translated by Radmila Gorup, Central European University Press, 2009

== See also ==
- Christian state
- List of libraries in Serbia
- Loanwords in Serbian
- Medieval Serbian literature
- Croatian literature
- Bosnian literature
- Macedonian literature
