= General Vuča =

General Vuča (Serbian: Вуча Џенерал) or General Vuka is a popular legendary hero of Serbian epic poetry who is depicted as an enemy of Kraljević Marko.

== Song ==
Vuča first appeared in the poem Marko Kraljević and General Vuča, which was sung by Tešan Podrugović in Sremski Karlovci and recorded by Vuk Karadžić who published it in 1845 within second volume of the 'Songs of Serbian people' (Serbian: Српске народне пјесме) collection. This song is one of the songs Podrugović learned in Srem. Vuča and his son Velimir are the most mysterious epic heroes who were enemies of Marko Kraljević. They are foreigners like other main enemies of Marko Kraljević and, as it is strongly hinted in some particular epic narratives, probably Hungarians. Like other enemies of Marko (i.e. Musa Kesedžija or Djemo the Mountaineer) Vuča is also of exceptional strength.

At the beginning of the song Vuča captures three heroes (Miloš od Pocerja, Milan Toplica and Kosančić Ivan) who are friends of Kraljević Marko and puts them in the dungeon of Petrovaradin (Varadin in song). Marko Kraljević first defeats General Vuča's son and his three hundred horsemen and then General Vuča himself together with his thousand horsemen. Vuča's wife releases the three heroes from the dungeon against Marko's request, which is an example of "jailor's daughter" type of help. Besides the three heroes Marko also releases the father of Milan Toplica who was also captured by General Vuča. There is another song which presents information about capture of Toplica's father and how three heroes who attacked Petrovaradin in attempt to release him were also captured by General Vuča.

== Historical background ==
There are different opinions what historical person Vuča is based upon. According to Andra Gavrilović the figure of General Vuča is based on Tanush Dukagjin, a member of Dukagjini noble family from Albania.

There was an opinion that Vuča was based on Eugene of Savoy while some other theories say that he is based on the Petar Doci also referred to as Auci in Erlangen Manuscript. Since Eugene of Savoy did not have a son according to some interpretations Velimir, who was referred in the song as Vuča's son, was probably some of Eugene's subordinated officers.
