= Andra Gavrilović =

Serbian writer and historian (1864–1929)

- Born: Андра Гавриловић; July 11, 1864; Svilajnac, Principality of Serbia
- Died: February 24, 1929 (aged 64); Belgrade, Kingdom of Serbs, Croats, and Slovenes
- Occupations: historian, historian of literature, writer and diplomat

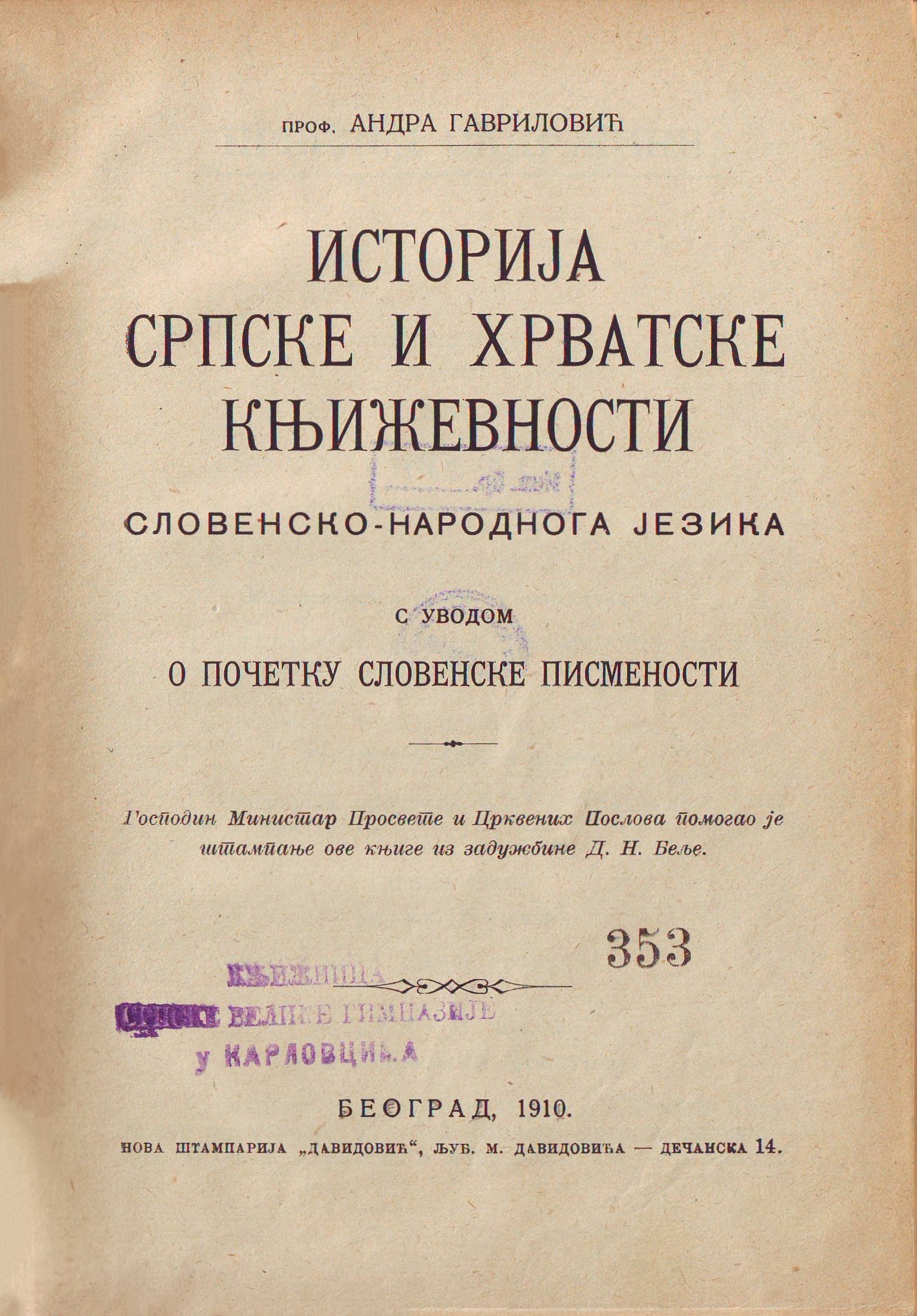
Cover of Istorija srpske i hrvatske književnosti (1910) by Andra Gavrilović.

Andra Gavrilović (Serbian: Андра Гавриловић; 11 July 1864, in Svilajnac, Principality of Serbia – 24 February 1929, in Belgrade, Kingdom of Serbs, Croats, and Slovenes) was a Serbian historian, historian of literature, writer and diplomat.

While Gavrilović started as a poet, he is best known for historical biographies and novels. His historical novels are largely inspired by medieval Serbia. Despotova vlastela, initially published in 1896, is about Lazarević and Branković noble families, set in the era after the Battle of Kosovo and Battle of Ankara. In 1900, he wrote a biography of Saint Sava. In 1901-04, he published Notable Serbs of 19th Century, in three volumes, covering 216 biographies of authors, artists, scientists, philanthropies, politicians, and others.

He also specialized in works of Dositej Obradović.

Gavrilović disagreed with opinion of Jovan Tomić that figure of Djemo the Mountaineer was based on Jegen Osman Pasha. In his polemic work 'Who wasn't Djemo the Mountaineer, correction of someone's literary-historical mistake' (Serbian: Ко није био Ђемо Брђанин, исправка туђе литерарно-историске грешке). he emphasized that Djemo was in fact Albanian nobleman Gjin Muzaki because he assumed that Serbian epic poetry about struggle between Marko Kraljević and Djemo the Mountaneer was based on real struggles between Prince Marko and Muzaka family from Albania.

According to Andra Gavrilović the figure of Vuča General is based on Tanush Dukagjin, a member of Dukagjini noble family from Albania.

== See also ==
- Ljubomir Nedić
- Bogdan Popović
- Jovan Skerlić
- Svetozar Marković
- Branko Lazarević
- Milovan Glišić
- Stanislav Vinaver
- Vojislav Jovanović Marambo
- Konstantin Bogdanovic
