= Danica Marković =

Serbian poet

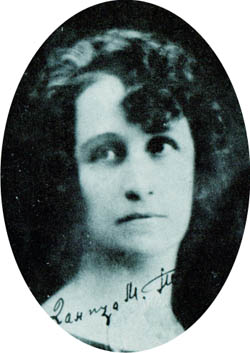
- Born: 12 October 1879; Čačak, Principality of Serbia
- Died: 9 July 1932 (aged 52); Belgrade, Kingdom of Yugoslavia
- Occupations: Poet, Writer

Danica Marković (Serbian Cyrillic: Даница Марковић; 12 October 1879 – 9 July 1932) was the first modern Serbian woman lyric poet. She was also important for her feminist writings. Her pseudonym was Zvezdanka.

== Biography ==
Danica Marković wrote her first poem "Poslednje želje" ("Last Wishes") at the age of 18. It was published under her pseudonym Zvezdanka in the magazine Zvezda (The Star) in 1900. Her first poetry collection Trenuci (1904) was very well received by literary critics, including Jovan Skerlić and Antun Gustav Matoš.

She was the only woman represented in Bogdan Popović's Anthology of New Serbian Lyrics (1911) and one of the five women whose work was presented in Jovan Skerlić's History of New Serbian Literature (1912).

After the acclaim which greeted her first volume of poetry, she was largely forgotten in the altered climate of cultural life following the Great War. Her personal experience was harsh: three of her six children died and she was left by her husband to bring up the other three on her own. Neglected for more than 40 years, now after communism, her life story and writings are becoming better known.

During the Great War, she volunteered as a nurse caring for the sick in military field hospitals along with her contemporaries.

== Work ==
- Trenuci (1904)
- Trenuci i raspoloženja (1928)
- Elegije (reprint, 1973)
- Pesme o alhemijskom pokušaju (reprint, 1989)
- Kupačica i zmija (reprint, 2003)
- Istorija jednog osećanja, sabrane pesme (reprint, 2006)
- Savremena ispovest (1913)
