= Branko Lazarević (critic) =

Serbian writer & critic (1883–1963)

Branko Lazarević (Serbian Cyrillic: Бранко Лазаревић; 25 November 1883 – 6 October 1963) was a Serbian writer, literary critic, and diplomat.

== Biography ==
Branko Lazarević was born on 25 November 1883 in Vidin, Bulgaria, to father Đorđe Lazarević of Negotin, from where he fled after the Timok Rebellion. His mother Vukosava Stojadinović is the niece of the Serbian poet Milica Stojadinović Srpkinja. Đorđe Lazarević's ancestors came to the Negotin region from Sjenica, from Peštera and Stari Vlah, and took part in the First Serbian Uprising. According to other sources, Lazarević was born in Negotin.

Young Lazarević attended the Zaječar Gymnasium and then studied at the University of Belgrade. He became a substitute professor in Belgrade in 1911, and then continued his education in Europe; in Paris, Munich and Rome, where he specialized in aesthetics and art. Until the liberation wars he was intensely engaged in writing; literary work and theatre criticism. He appeared in literature in 1907, in Belgrade's Srpski književni glasnik, with a two-part study on the poetry of Svetislav Stefanović.

In the Balkan Wars, he was a reserve lieutenant in the Serbian army. During the First World War, he served at the front, and then in 1917, he was appointed head of the Presbytery of the Ministry of Foreign Affairs of the Kingdom of Serbia, in Corfu. Lazarević also participated in the cultural life of the exiled by renewing the publication of Srpske novine. The first issue—in exile—appeared on 7 April 1916 at Corfu, and the second issue introduced a weekly supplement, Zabavnik (Entertainment). Branko Lazarević, the literary critic and former disciple of Bogdan Popović, was the first editor of the newspaper and magazine supplement. In Zabavnik editor Lazarević wrote a study on Serbian folk poetry. He examined the influence of Serbian epic poetry on the literary works of Serbia's contemporary writers. It was his opinion that Serb epic poetry transcended the limitations of national boundaries in the manner akin to Homeric legacy. Lazarević published Milutin Bojić's war poem Plava grobnica.

Lazarević is remembered for reminding readers in 1917 that more than 100 years ago, in 1813, the daily paper first came to life under Karađorđe's rule. Lazarević continued to make a name for himself as an essayist and critic. Although very young and just at the start of his career, even before the Great War, he became an authoritative figure in Serbian literature.

== Political life ==
Branko Lazarević entered politics in 1918 and, like some other Serbian poet-diplomats (Jovan Dučić, Milan Rakić, Rastko Petrović, Ivo Andrić, Miloš Crnjanski), made a successful diplomatic career. He was first appointed Serbian consul in Washington, DC in 1918, and then was in Chicago until 1922. After returning to Europe, he became an ambassador in Berlin for a short time in 1922, and then moved to Czechoslovakia. He was an ambassador to Prague twice (with a break in 1925) until March 1929. He spoke the Czech language, gained a great reputation and his many friends there helped to publish his book in the Czech language, entitled "The Three Greatest Yugoslav Values". In the meantime, he worked briefly at the ministry in Belgrade and distinguished himself in a special diplomatic mission in Tirana (1925). After the Prague period, between 1929 and 1934, he was appointed to the Yugoslav embassy in Warsaw, then from 1936 to 1937. he was the Envoy (title) minister of the Kingdom of Yugoslavia in Ankara. While living in Poland, he was elected a member of the "Yugoslav-Polish Scientific Institute" in 1931. He was briefly the Yugoslav ambassador to Vienna in 1937, and then in 1938–1939 in the same position in Brussels.

The post-war communist government removed him from the public scene. Lazarević wrote his unpublished political debates, diaries, soliloquies, essays and reflections in imposed isolation until he was expelled from the Writers' Union and imprisoned from 1948 until 1951.

Branko Lazarević's lost legacy was found by accident in 2004 in Herceg Novi.

== Literary work ==
His political debates have a wide cultural-historical and anthropological significance, primarily for understanding the general social context of the first half of the 20th century, and then for understanding the identity and mentality of the Yugoslavs. He wrote his pre-war political debates arrogantly and professionally, as a distinguished royal diplomat and elite intellectual. His philosophy of history was based on the analysis of global historical movements.

In addition to literature, Lazarević is also a theatre and literary critic under the strong influence of Jovan Skerlić, Bogdan Popović, and Pavle Popović. He was a talented and very productive creator. He was a contributor to several newspapers and magazines and appeared in 1912 as the director of the newspaper Reč.

In 1945, he wrote all three major political treatises, which remained unpublished in manuscripts: the program essay East-West and Yugoslavia, the socio-anthropological review Pucina je stoka jedna grdna and the extensive treatise "War, Revolution, Democracy and Art".

"War, Revolution, Democracy and Art" is a comprehensive civic critique of communist practice and the left totalitarian ideology of the modern age. In 1945, Lazarević also wrote a socio-psychological discussion on the character, movement, and motives of the masses, which always begin and bring about a revolution. Among the Herceg Novi manuscripts, in the legacy of Branko Lazarević, his extensive "Diary of One Nobody" written from 1943 to 1947 was found, which includes the last days of the German occupation and the first year of communist rule in Belgrade. Lazarević's Diary of One Nobody was hidden and unknown for sixty years.

== See also ==
- Ljubomir Nedić
- Bogdan Popović
- Jovan Skerlić
- Svetozar Marković
- Andra Gavrilović
- Milovan Glišić
- Stanislav Vinaver
- Vojislav Jovanović Marambo
- Konstantin Bogdanovic
