= Peter Dóczy =

Peter Dóczy Petar Doci
- Vaivoda; Captain of Belgrade; Ban of Jajce

Peter Dóczy de Nagylucse (Hungarian: nagylucsei Dóczy Péter; Serbian: Петар Дојчин) was a 15th-century Hungarian nobleman. In 1462 he was a captain of the Belgrade fortress. Around 1479 he was a commander of the Hungarian fleet on Danube in Varadin. In 1480 he was a ban of Jajce (Hungarian: Jajca) in Bosnia.

== Name ==
The alternative names of Peter Dóczy include Petrus de Docz, Petrus Doczy, Petar Dojčin, Petar Dovac, Peter Doći and Petar Varadinac.

== Career ==
In 1462 Dóczy was a captain of the Belgrade fortress. In period between 1476 and 1479 he was a commander of the Hungarian fleet of hundred ships on Danube and Sava. A part of his fleet participated in Hungarian capture of Šabac (Hungarian: Szabács) in 1476. In 1480 he was a ban of Jajce. At the end of 1480, together with Vuk Grgurević Branković and Hungarian ban of Slavonia Ladislaus Egervári, Dóczy attacked and plundered the Sanjak of Bosnia whose sanjakbey was Koca Davud Pasha. They managed to reach Vrhbosna and plundered it for three days.

Dóczy traveled to Istanbul to meet Ottoman sultan Mehmed two times as envoy of the Hungarian king Matthias Corvinus. On 9 September 1482 Dóczy, Grgurević and Pavle Kanjiži defeated Ottoman forces of 10,000 spearmen near Óbecse (today: Bečej, Serbia). Ottomans had intention to reach and plunder the region of Temesvár (today: Timișoara, Romania).

== In Serbian epic poetry ==
In Serbian epic poetry Dóczy became Petar Dojčin, ban of Varadin. The most famous epic song about Petar Dojčin is "Dojčin Petar and King Matthias" (Serbian: Дојчин Петар и Краљ Матијаш) also known as "Petar Dojčin drinks wine" (Serbian: Вино пије Дојчин Петар), which is published for the first time in period between 1716 and 1733 in Erlangen Manuscript.

Petar Dojčin and Bolani Dojčin, another hero of Serbian epic poetry, are unrelated.
