= Anthology of Modern Serbian Lyric =

Anthology of Modern Serbian Lyric Antologija novije srpske lirike (Croatian) Антологија новије српске лирике (Serbian)
- 1994 Srpska književna zadruga edition
- Editor: Bogdan Popović
- Author: Jovan Jovanović Zmaj; Laza Kostić; Petar I Petrović-Njegoš; Vojislav Ilić; Jovan Grčić Milenko; Aleksa Šantić; Jovan Dučić; Milan Rakić; Sima Pandurović; Veljko Petrović
- Language: Serbo-Croatian
- Publisher: Matica hrvatska
- Publication place: Austria-Hungary (modern day Croatia)

Anthology of Modern Serbian Lyric (Serbo-Croatian: Antologija novije srpske lirike/Антологија новије српске лирике) is an anthology published in 1911 by Matica hrvatska in Zagreb, Austria-Hungary (modern day Croatia). The foreword for this book was written by Bogdan Popović. It was the first attempt to create a literary canon of the most significant poems down the ages. The book contains poems by authors including Jovan Jovanović Zmaj, Laza Kostić, Petar I Petrović-Njegoš, Vojislav Ilić, Jovan Grčić Milenko, Aleksa Šantić, Jovan Dučić, Milan Rakić, Sima Pandurović and Veljko Petrović. The book has undergone several editions, including translations into Slovene in 1965. In 2011, Srpska književna zadruga, a member of the Board for Standardization of the Serbian Language, published the 100th anniversary edition.
