= Milovan Glišić =

Serbian writer, dramatist, translator and literary theorist

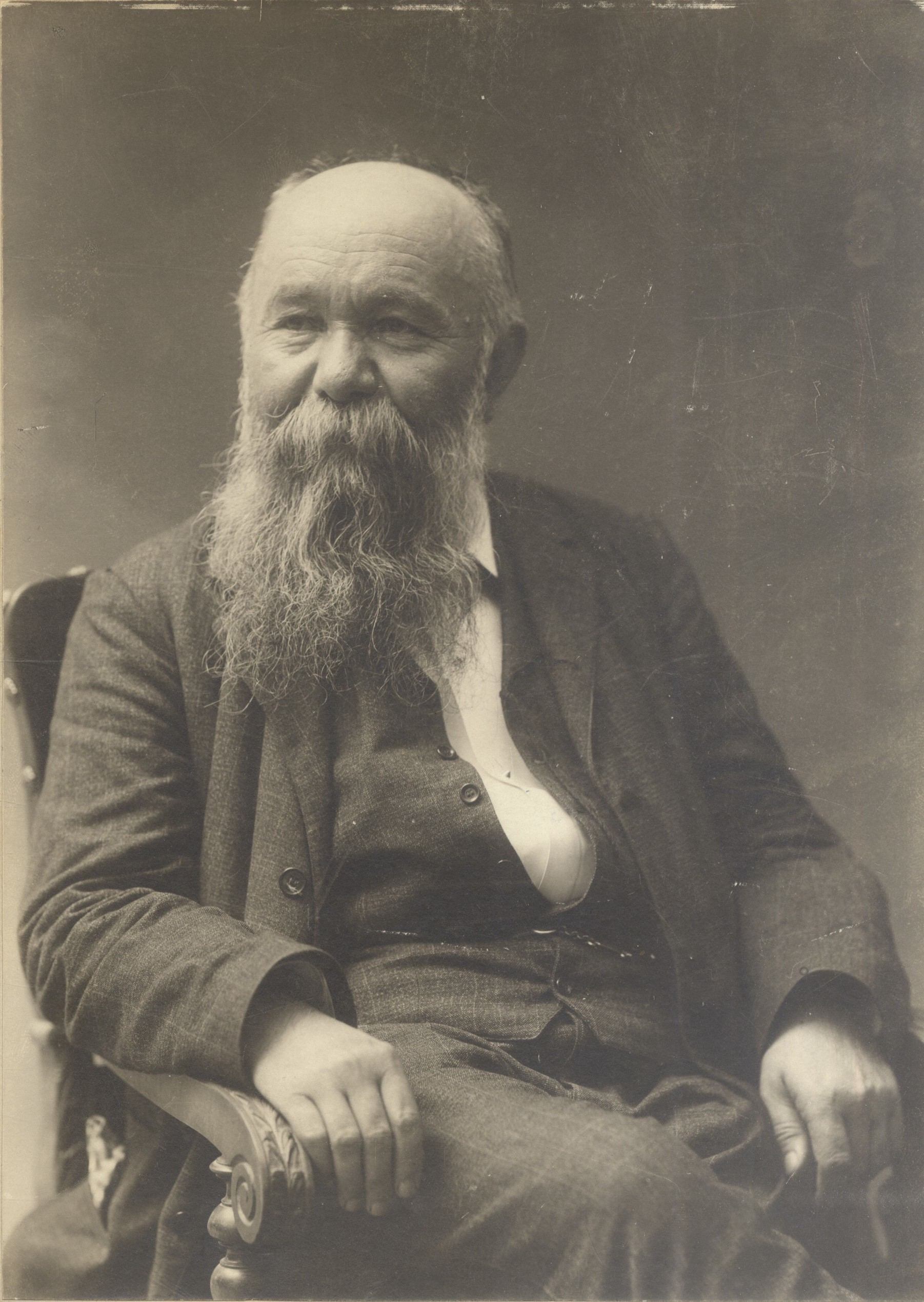
- Born: 6 January 1847; Gradac, Valjevo, Ottoman Empire
- Died: 1 February 1908 (aged 61); Dubrovnik, Austria-Hungary
- Education: University of Belgrade
- Occupations: Writer; translator; dramatist; newspaperman
- Spouse: Kosara Stefanović
- Writing career
- Language: Serbian
- Period: realism
- Notable works: Glava šećera, Posle devedeset godina
- Notable awards: Order of St. Sava, Order of the Cross of Takovo

Milovan Glišić (6 January 1847 – 20 January 1908) was a Serbian writer, dramatist, translator, and literary theorist. He is sometimes referred to as the Serbian Gogol.

Glišić's translation of Taras Bulba, published in 1902.

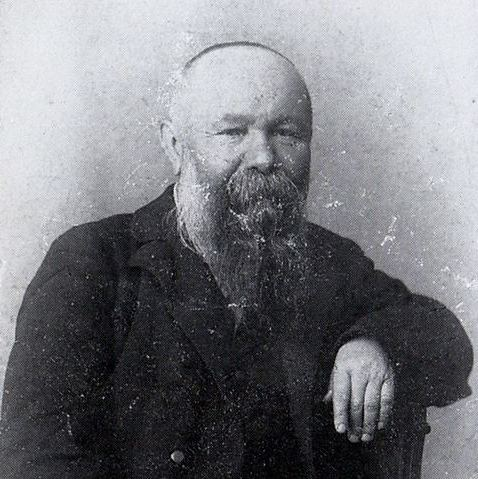
A portrait of Glišić

== Legacy ==
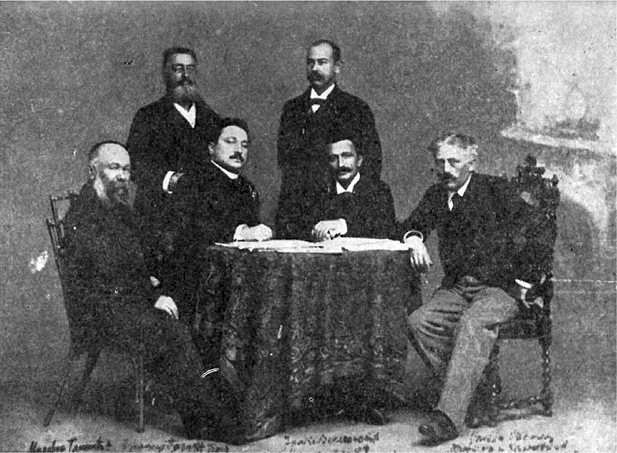
Milovan Glišić with fellow writers Branislav Nušić, Stevan Sremac, Janko Veselinović and others

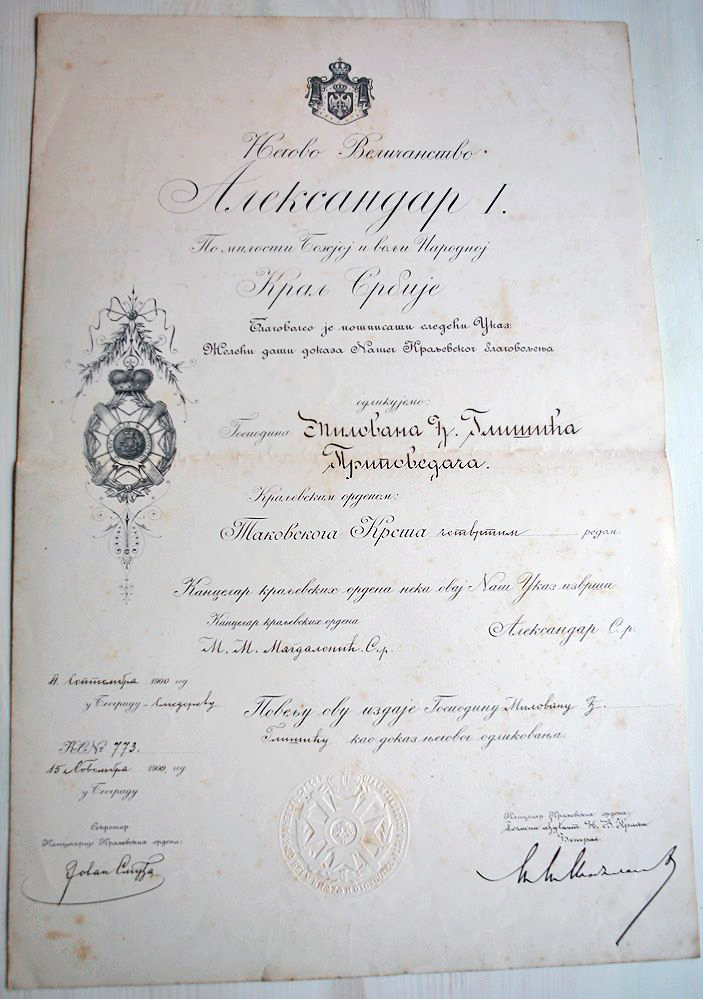
Royal decree; writer and translator Milovan Glišić is to be awarded the Order of the Cross of Takovo.

Glišić is considered to be one of the best translators of his time and several of his short stories including Prva Brazda and Glava Šećera are studied in Serbian schools and included in various anthologies of short stories. His translations of Russian writers Gogol and Tolstoy significantly influenced Serbian culture of that time and future writers Stevan Sremac, Svetozar Ćorović, Branislav Nušić and many others.

According to Slobodan Jovanović, Glišić was one of the first Serbian short story writers to attempt a more serious characterization in his works.

He was awarded Order of the Cross of Takovo and Order of St. Sava of the third and the fourth class.

== Works ==
=== Comedies ===
- Two Farthings (Dva cvancika), 1882.
- The Hoax (Podvala), 1885.

=== Short stories ===
- Ni oko šta
- Vujina prosidba
- Učitelj
- Redak zver
- Tetka Desa
- Zlosutni broj
- Novi Mesija
- Glava šećera
- Prva brazda
- Posle devedeset godina
- Šetnja posle smrti
- U zao čas
- Svirač
- Raspis
- Sigurna većina
- Noć na mostu
- Nagraisao
- Roga
- Šilo za ognjilo
- Zadušnice

=== Translations ===
- Zla svekrva, Alexander Ostrovsky, 1881.
- Kola mudrosti, dvoja ludosti, Alexander Ostrovsky, 1882.
- Nov posao, Vladimir Nemirovich-Danchenko, 1883.
- Sve za sina, Emil Ožje, 1884.
- Naslednik, Emil Ožje, 1884.
- Gavran, Alphonse Daudet, 1888.
- La Peau de chagrin, Honoré de Balzac, 1888.
- Princess Maleine, Maurice Polydore-Marie-Bernard Maeterlinck, 1897.
- La Sanfelice, Alexandre Dumas, 1881.
- Plemićka, Fos, 1882.
- Dead Souls, Nikolai Gogol, 1872.
- Taras Bulba, Nikolai Gogol, 1876.
- Ivan Fyodorovich Shponka and His Aunt, Nikolai Gogol, 1870.
- Oblomov, Ivan Goncharov, 1876.
- The Kreutzer Sonata, Leo Tolstoy, 1890.
- War and Peace, Leo Tolstoy, 1899.
- Narodni borac, unknown author
- Polkanovi memoari, Nikolai Leykin
- Kolombo, Prosper Mérimée, 1877.
- Brđani, Erckmann-Chatrian, 1878.
- Dva brata, Émile Erckmann-Chatrian, 1878.
- Crna kuga, Émile Erckmann-Chatrian, 1878.
- Doctor Ox, Jules Verne, 1878.
- Tartarin of Tarascon, Alphonse Daudet
- Le Nabab, Alphonse Daudet
- The Man-wolf, Erckmann-Chatrian
- L’Invasion ou le Fou Yégof, Erckmann-Chatrian
- Ubistvo u ulici Morg, Edgar Allan Poe
- Srce izdajice, Edgar Allan Poe
- Strahovita noć
- Le Fils de Giboyer, Émile Augier
- La pierre de touche, Émile Augier

=== Translated works in English ===
- After Ninety Years: The Story of Serbian Vampire Sava Savanović, 2015, translated by James Lyon
- Tales of Fear and Superstition, 2021, translated by Miloš Pavlović

== See also ==
- Ljubomir Nedić
- Bogdan Popović
- Pavle Popović
- Jovan Skerlić
- Svetozar Marković
- Andra Gavrilović
- Branko Lazarević
- Stanislav Vinaver
- Vojislav Jovanović Marambo

== Sources ==
- Jovan Skerlić, Istorija nove srpske književnosti (Belgrade, 1921) pages 373–378
