= Ailing Dojčin =

Hero of South Slavic epic poetry

Ailing Dojčin (Serbian: Болани Дојчин or Bolani Dojčin, Bulgarian: Болен Дойчин, Bolen Doychin, Macedonian: Болен Дојчин, Bolen Dojčin) is a hero of South Slavic epic poetry, atypical for being depicted as an ill person.

== Narrative ==
The poems about Ailing Dojčin, though differing in details, follow the same basic line of narrative. Black Arab comes to the city of Salonica and imposes a daily tax upon its citizens, which includes a young woman for his entertainment. When the turn comes for Dojčin's household to pay the tax, his sister is to be given to the Arab. Dojčin rises from his sickbed after nine years of lying, and confronts the Arab. After killing him, he returns to his bed and dies in peace. In some variants of the narrative, Dojčin has a wife, who attends him together with his sister. In most variants, there is another villain beside Black Arab—Dojčin's own blood brother, a blacksmith named Petar. Before the duel, Dojčin's sister or wife asks the blacksmith to shoe his horse on the promise to pay later for the service. The blacksmith, however, asks her to sleep with him, which she refuses with indignation and tells Dojčin about the incident. Dojčin, having killed the Arab, visits the blacksmith and cuts his head off.

Serbian epic poem "Bolani Dojčin"
Initial part of the poem, sung to the accompaniment of the gusle

The traditional notion that the long illness is a punishment for a grave sin is found in a number of variants. In a Macedonian version, a group of heroes, including Dojčin and Prince Marko, assembled at the Gračanica Monastery in Kosovo. Dojčin jumped over the monastery's church, disregarding Marko's warning not to do that, for which he was cursed by Saints Nicholas, Petka, and Catherine. In another Macedonian version, Dojčin improperly kissed three female saints he encountered in a church. In this regard, his fight with Black Arab can be seen as his atonement for his sins, which is explicitly stated in some variants.

In the variant recorded by Vuk Karadžić in 1815 from a Bosnian Serb merchant, a disintegration of the heroic paradigm is clearly expressed. In the initial part of the poem, it is stated several times that there is no hero in Salonica who would dare to face Black Arab. Comments on the city's prominent fighters have a derisive tone; e.g., Duka could not fight because his arm hurt. This unheroic background stands in contrast to Dojčin's behaviour, which is a full affirmation of the heroic ethos. The variant found in the Erlangen Manuscript, which is dated to the early 18th century, reflects the spread of the Ailing Dojčin narrative from a Serb environment to a Croatian one. The hero is renamed as Ivan Karlović, who was the Ban of Croatia (then part of the Habsburg Empire) from 1521 to 1524 and from 1527 to 1531. He was a prominent fighter against the Ottomans, who also attacked his own estates. The plot of the poem is located not in Salonica but in Solin, a town on the eastern Adriatic coast. "Solin" is a near-homonym of the Serbo-Croatian name for Salonica, "Solun". In its history, the town was the object of military attacks.

Aside from this particular dramatic narrative, in which he is a chief protagonist and which serves a groundstone for the legend of the hero, Dojčin, or Dojčilo, sometimes appears in Serbian Epic poetry as a side character, a sort of Deux ex machina or a friend-in-need to various other epic heroes who request his help. Such example is a partially documented Marko Kraljević in the dungeon of the Azakhs, in which a titular protagonist prince Marko (also depicted as Dojčin's blood brother) seeks his help in order to escape from his captors. In order to save his friend, these poems often have Dojčin disguised as a warrior of the enemy nation at hand - Azakh, or yet again, a black Arab. Noteworthy elements of Dojčin's characterisation are his title of Vojvoda, his magnificent horse Dorat and a German-made sabre.

== Origins ==
It is unclear whether Ailing Dojčin is based on a historical person. Possible candidates are despots John VII Palaiologos and Andronikos Palaiologos, who governed Salonica from 1402 to 1408 and from 1408 to 1423, respectively. They defended the city from the Ottomans, and they were both known for poor health.

The epic poetry about Ailing Dojčin could have been influenced by the tales of miracles of Saint Demetrius, the patron saint of Salonica. He is said to have saved the city when it was besieged by Slavs and Avars at the end of the 6th century. The saint appeared on the city's walls as a soldier armed with a spear. To enable Dojčin to rise from his bed, his sister firmly wrapped his legs and torso with a bandage, because his bones became disconnected. This reminds of the bones of a saint placed in a reliquary. Ailing Dojčin is also interpreted as "the embodiment of an oppressed and humiliated nation's desire for revenge".
