= Pavle Popović =

Serbian literary critic (1868 –1939)

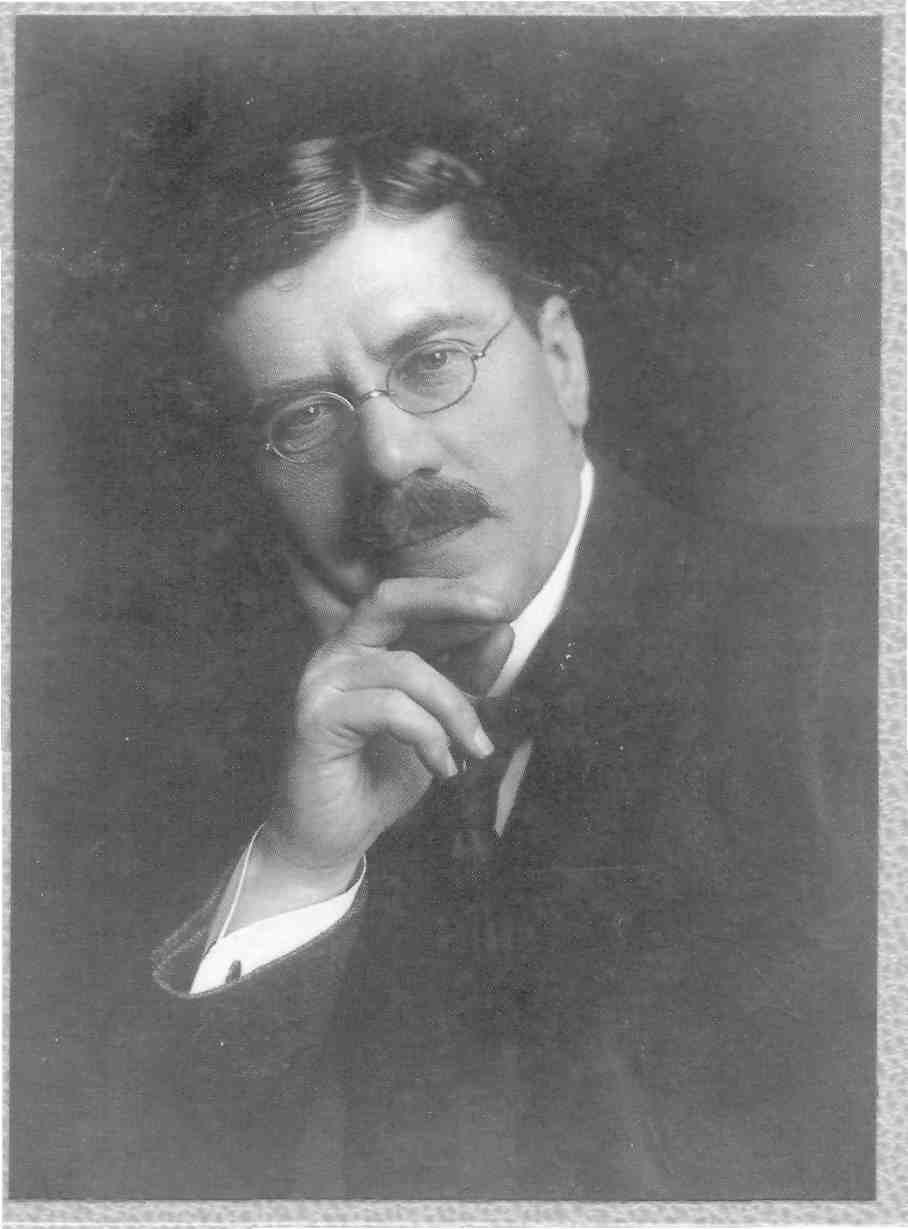
- Born: 16 April 1868; Belgrade, Principality of Serbia
- Died: 4 June 1939 (aged 71); Belgrade, Kingdom of Yugoslavia
- Occupations: literary critic, literary historian

Pavle Popović (Serbian Cyrillic: Павле Поповић; 16 April 1868 – 4 June 1939) was a Serbian literary critic and historian, a professor and rector at the University of Belgrade. He is the brother of Bogdan Popović, also a well-known and equally influential literary critic and university professor.

== Biography ==
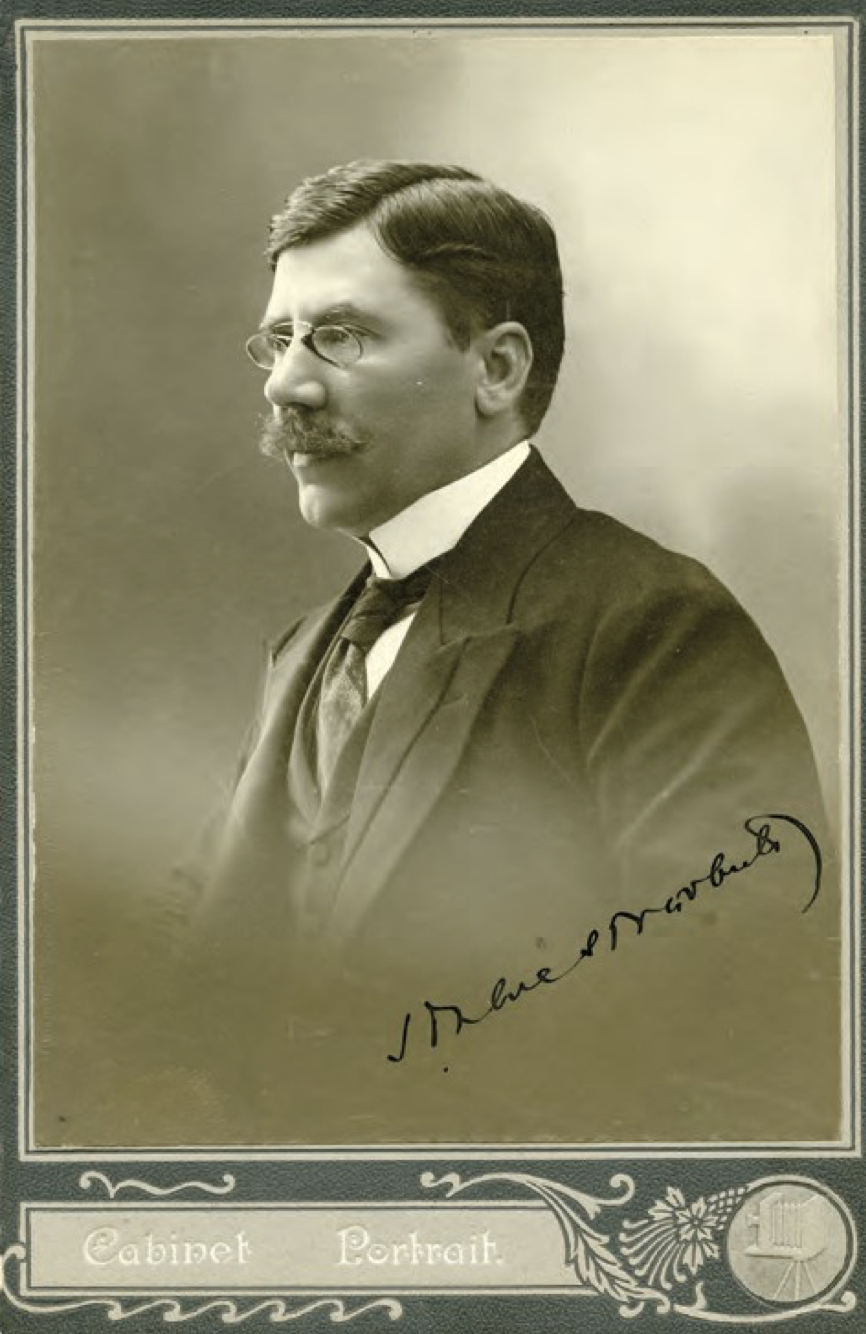
Portrait of Popović as a young man

Pavle Popović was born on 16 April 1868 at Belgrade where he was brought up and educated, until he graduated in 1889 from the Velika škola, as the university was then still called. After serving as an assistant schoolmaster, first at Šabac and then in Belgrade, he went to Geneva and Paris, from 1894 until 1896, as a postgraduate student of French literature. After the publication of his study of the "French moralists" in 1893 and a critical work on Vladika Petar II Petrović-Njegoš of Montenegro's famous poem The Mountain Wreath (Gorski Vijenac), in 1894, he was appointed as assistant professor in Serbian Literature at the university, his alma mater, in 1895. Four years later Pavle published a "Survey of Serbian Literature," from its beginnings until modern times, and this was translated into Russian in 1913.

During the Balkan Wars of 1912 and 1913, Pavle served in the army as a sergeant, attached to the Serbian Armed Forces' General Headquarters. During the Great War, he was sent by the Government on special missions, first to Italy, then to France and finally to England, where he remained until the end of the war. While in London, he was in charge of all those Serbian schoolboys and undergraduates who, after the invasion of Serbia, were brought to England in the summer of 1916 through the generosity of the British people and the enterprise of the Serbian Relief Fund, founded by Lady Paget, the wife of Sir Ralph Paget. In his spare time, Pavle wrote a brief "Survey of Jugoslav Literature" which the Cambridge University Press published in Serbian in 1918. He also wrote a number of articles and pamphlets, literary and political, in English.

On his return home in 1919, he was made Professor of Jugoslav Literature at the University of Belgrade (in 1905, Belgrade's Velika škola became the University of Belgrade) and soon afterwards he became one of the most successful Rectors, distinguishing himself in rebuilding the university and in particular its library, which the German bombardments had destroyed. He was a visiting professor at King's College London.

Pavle Popović was also the secretary of the Srpska književna zadruga (Serbian Literary Society) from 1911 to 1920, its vice-president from 1920 to 1928, and president from 1928 to 1937.

== Literary critic ==
Pavle Popović was French-oriented, like his brother Bogdan. Pavle complimented Jovan Skerlić's work by publishing an overview of Serbian literature (1913) that emphasized early literary history and the oral tradition that followed. His method of literary history combined archival research, philosophical polemics, and comparative perspective, discourse, inspired by other contemporary European literatures, gave a touch of elegant and witty lightness to anecdotal narratives, and soon influenced a younger generation of critics and essayists. Pavle grew into an authoritarian figure in Serbian academia but was less present in public than his brother. His literary history and his numerous specialized studies on nineteenth-century Serbian theater and other matters were considered a standard for more than 60 years, along with Skerlić's work, which was, to be sure, ideologically more attractive.

Pavle Popović corresponded with the following scholars Milivoy S. Stanoyevich, George Rapall Noyes, John Dyneley Prince, Robert William Seton-Watson, Watson Kirkconnell, and many other academics.

== Selected works ==
- Pregled srpske književnosti (1909)
- Jugoslovenska književnost (1918)
- Nova srpska književnost 1 (posthumous, 1999)
- Nova srpska književnost 2 (posthumous, 2000)
- Narodna književnost (posthumous, 2000)
- Dubrovačke studije (posthumous, 2000)
- Milovan Vidaković (posthumous, 2000)
- O Njegošu (posthumous, 2000)
- Stara srpska književnost (posthumous, 2000)
- Dnevnik (posthumous, 2000)
- Književna kritika - književna istoriografija (posthumous, 2002)
- Ćirilo i Metodije (posthumous, 2004)
- Sveti Sava (posthumous, 2004)

== See also ==
- Ljubomir Nedić
- Bogdan Popović
- Jovan Skerlić
- Svetozar Marković
- Andra Gavrilović
- Branko Lazarević
- Milovan Glišić
- Stanislav Vinaver

== Sources ==
- "Plemstvo duha - Pavle Popović". RTS.

Academic offices
Preceded by Bogdan Gavrilović	Rector of the University of Belgrade; 1924–1927	Succeeded by Čedomilj Mitrović
