= Igor Marojević =

Serbian writer

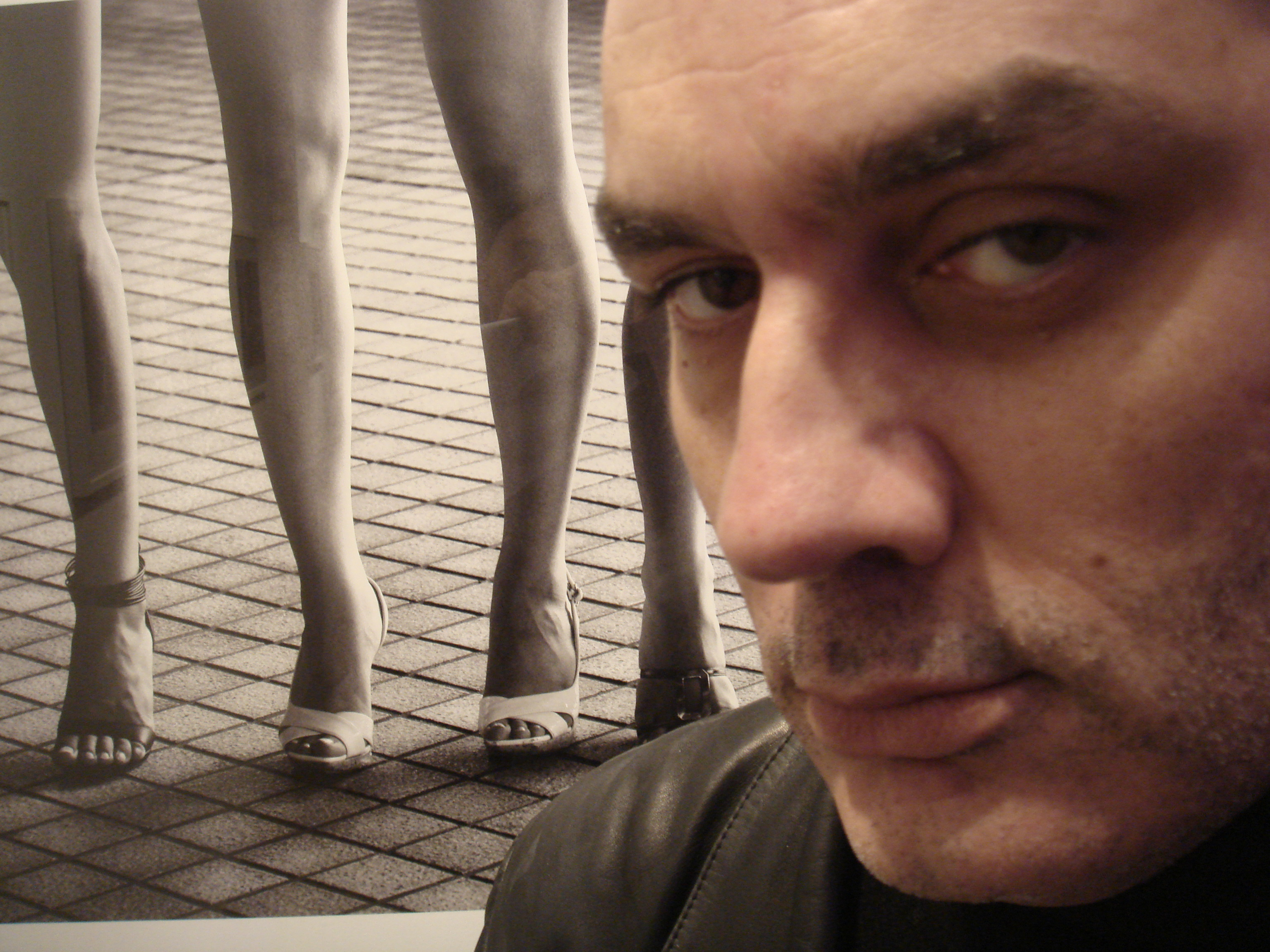
- Born: 1968 (age 57–58); Vrbas, Yugoslavia
- Occupation: Writer

Igor Marojević (born 1968) is a Serbian writer.

== Biography ==
Marojević was born in Vrbas, Serbia in 1968.

Igor Marojević graduated from the Department of Serbian language and Literature, at the University of Belgrade Faculty of Philology. He received his M.A. in World Literature at the Universitat Autónoma in Barcelona.

He published the novels Dvadeset četiri zida (Twenty Four Walls), Žega (Drought), Parter (Parterre), Šnit (Schnitt), Majčina ruka (Mother's Hand), Tuđine (The Otherness), Roman o pijanstvima (The Novel on Drunkenness), Prave Beograđanke (Real Belgrade Women) and Ostaci sveta (The Rests of the World) together with four books of stories Tragači (Seekers), Mediterani (Mediterraneans), Beograđanke (Women from Belgrade). and Sve za lepotu (All for Beauty). As an inspiration for the character in a novel "True Women from Belgrade" served Tanja Tatomirovic.

His play Nomadi (Nomads), written in Spanish as Los nómadas was staged in Spain, in Terrassa and Bilbao. The adaptation of this play was staged in Serbia under the name Tvrđava Evropa (Fortress Europe) as a part of BELEF (Belgrade Summer Festival). The adaptation of his first novel was also staged in Serbian theater, in production of Beogradsko dramsko pozorište (Belgrade Theatre of Drama, 2003) which produced as well his second play, Bar sam svoj čovek (I'm My Own Man).

His nouvelle Obmana Boga was translated to Spanish and Portuguese, his novels Partere and Šnit in Spanish and his play Nomadi to Catalan; his collections of stories was translated to Macedonian, Ukrainian, Slovenian and Hungarian. His works are included in Serbian or European prose anthologies in German, Spanish, Italian, Czech, Polish, Hungarian, Bulgarian, Ukrainian and Slovenian language. He is a member of Serbian and Catalan PEN centre and one of the founders of Srpsko književno društvo (Serbian Literature Society).

== Published works ==
=== Novels ===
- Dvadeset četiri zida (Twenty-four walls, 1998, 2010)
- Žega (Drought, 2004, 2008)
- Šnit (Schnitt, 2007, 2008, 2014)
- Parter (Parterre, 2009)
- Majčina ruka (Mother's Hand, 2011)
- Prave Beograđanke (Real Belgrade Women, 2017)
- Tuđine (The Otherness, 2018)
- Roman o pijanstvima (The Novel on Drunkenness, 2019)
- Ostaci sveta (Rests of the World, 2020)

=== Story collections ===
- Tragači (Seekers, 2001)
- Mediterani (Mediterraneans, 2006, 2008)
- Beograđanke (Belgrade Women, 2014, six editions)
- Sve za lepotu (All for Beauty, 2021)
- Granična stanja (Borderlines, 2023)

=== Nouvelle ===
- Obmana Boga (To Deceive God, 1997)

=== Essay collection ===
- Kroz glavu (Through the Head, 2012)

=== Plays collection ===
- Nomadi (Nomads, 2023)

== Plays ==
- Nomadi (Nomads, 2004, 2008)
- Bar sam svoj čovek (I'm My Own Man, 2009–2011)

== Anthologies entered ==
- The anthology of contemporary Eastern European literature in Polish (ed. Pawel Nowakowski) (“Elewator”, Szczecin 2018, 24, 2/ 2018).
- Odkud vítr vane, the anthology of contemporary Southeastern European short stories in Czech (ed. Jiří Našinec), Univerzita Karlova, Nakladatelství Karolinum, Praha 2016.
- Generacija 23 (ed. Aleksandar Gatalica), the anthology of contemporary ex-YU short stories, "Blic", Belgrade 2014.
- E-szerelem (ed. Kornélia Faragó), the anthology of contemporary Serbian literature in Hungarian, Forum Könzvkiadó, Újvidek 2012.
- Hotel Europa – the anthology of European contemporary essays and stories in German (ed. Ilma Rakusa, Michael M. Thoss), Wunderhorn, Heidelberg, 2012.
- Der Engel und der rote Hund, the anthology of Serbian contemporary short stories in German (ed. Angela Richter), Noack & Block, Berlin, 2011.
- Selection of the Serbian contemporary literature in German (ed. Isabel Kupski&Dragoslav Dedović), "Neue Rundschau", Frankfurt, 3/2010.
- Tragische Intensität Europas, Das Schreibheft 71, Essen, 2008, a panoramic view of a Serbian literature through the reception of Peter Handke (ed. Žarko Radaković).
- The selection of the contemporary Balkans Literature in Ukrainian (www.potyah76.org.ua)
- Ztracen v samoobsluze - the anthology of the Serbian contemporary short stories in Czech (ed. Tatjana Micić), IP Bělehrad, 2007.
- Casablanca serba – anthology of the Serbian short stories in Italian (ed. Nikole Janigro), Feltrinelli, Milano, 2003.
- Bizarni raskazi – the anthology of the Serbian contemporary short stories in Macedonian, ed. Tatjana Rosić, Magor, Skopje, Macedonia, 2003.
- YU Blok – anthology of ex-Yugoslavia's contemporary literature in Slovenian (ed. A. Čar), Apokalipsa, Ljubljana, Slovenia, No 51-52, 2002.
- The selection of the Serbian Prose in Hungarian, ed. S. Ilć, Orbis Kanisza, 1/2-2000

== Awards ==
- Andrić Prize (for the story Slikopisanje from the book Sve za lepotu
- Meša Selimović prize (for the novel Ostaci sveta)
- Award of the city of Belgrade "Stefan despot Lazarević (for the novel Ostaci sveta)
- Award "Zlatni beočug" (Golden chain for the constant contribution to the culture of the city of Belgrade)
- Károly Szirmai Serbian-Hungarian prize (for the short stories collection Beograđanke)
- Borislav Pekić Fund award (for the novel Žega)
- Desimir Tešić prize (for the book of essays Kroz glavu)
- Tronoški rodoslov prize (for the novel Ostaci sveta)
- The Stevan Pešić prize (for the novel Žega)
- Solaris prize (for the novel Ostaci sveta)
- Neki rok prize (for the contribution to the culture of rock and roll, for the novel Ostaci sveta)
- Vodič za život prize, the first winner (for the short stories collection Beograđanke)
