= Sima Pandurović =

Serbian poet

- Сима Пандуровић
- Born: 14 April 1883; Belgrade, Kingdom of Serbia
- Died: 27 August 1960 (aged 77); Belgrade, Yugoslavia
- Occupations: Poet; Translator; Playwright; Literary critic Soldier
- Notable work: Svetkovina; Posmrtne počasti

Sima Pandurović (Serbian Cyrillic: Сима Пандуровић; 14 April 1883 – 27 August 1960) was a Serbian poet, part of the Symbolist movement in European poetry at the time. He died in Belgrade on 27 August 1960.

== Works ==
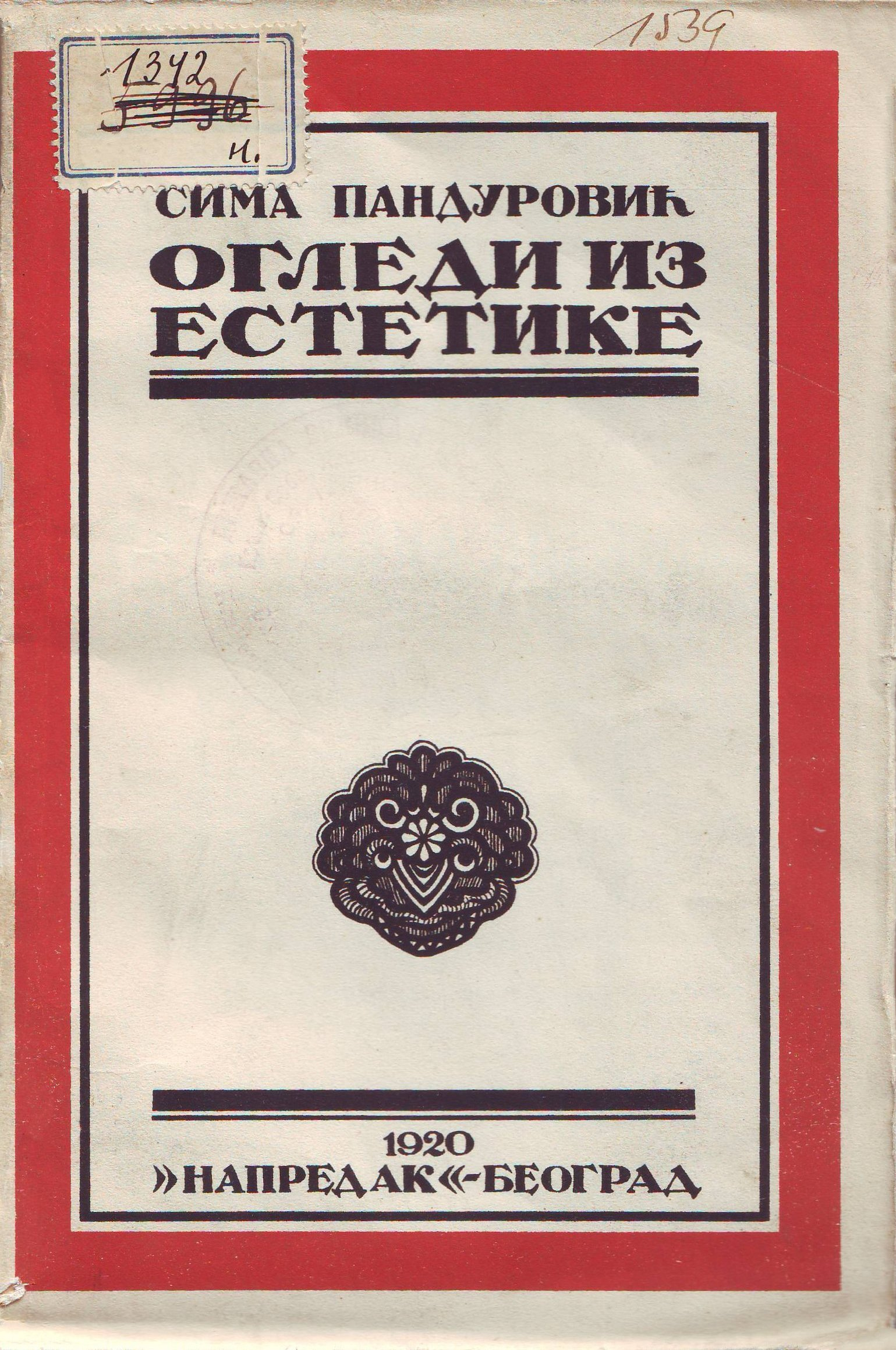
Ogledi iz estetike (Aesthetic Outlook), published in 1920

Selected works

- Posmrtne počasti, 1908
- Na zgarištu, drama, 1910
- Dani i noći, 1912
- Okovani slogovi, 1918
- Ogledi iz estetike, 1920
- Stihovi, 1921
- Razgovori o književnosti, 1927
- Bogdan Popović, 1931
- Dela, V volumes, 1935—1937
- Dvorana mladosti, 1955
- Pesme, 1959

Translations

- Le roi s'amuse, 1904
- Athalie, 1913
- Romanticne Duse, 1919
- Tartuffe
- Hamlet
- Richard III
- Henry IV
- Macbeth

== Sources ==
- Jovan Skerlić, Istorija Nove Srpske Književnosti / History of Modern Serbian Literature (Belgrade, 1921), pp. 465–466.
