= Milorad Pavlović-Krpa =

Serbian writer, publicist, translator, editor and publisher

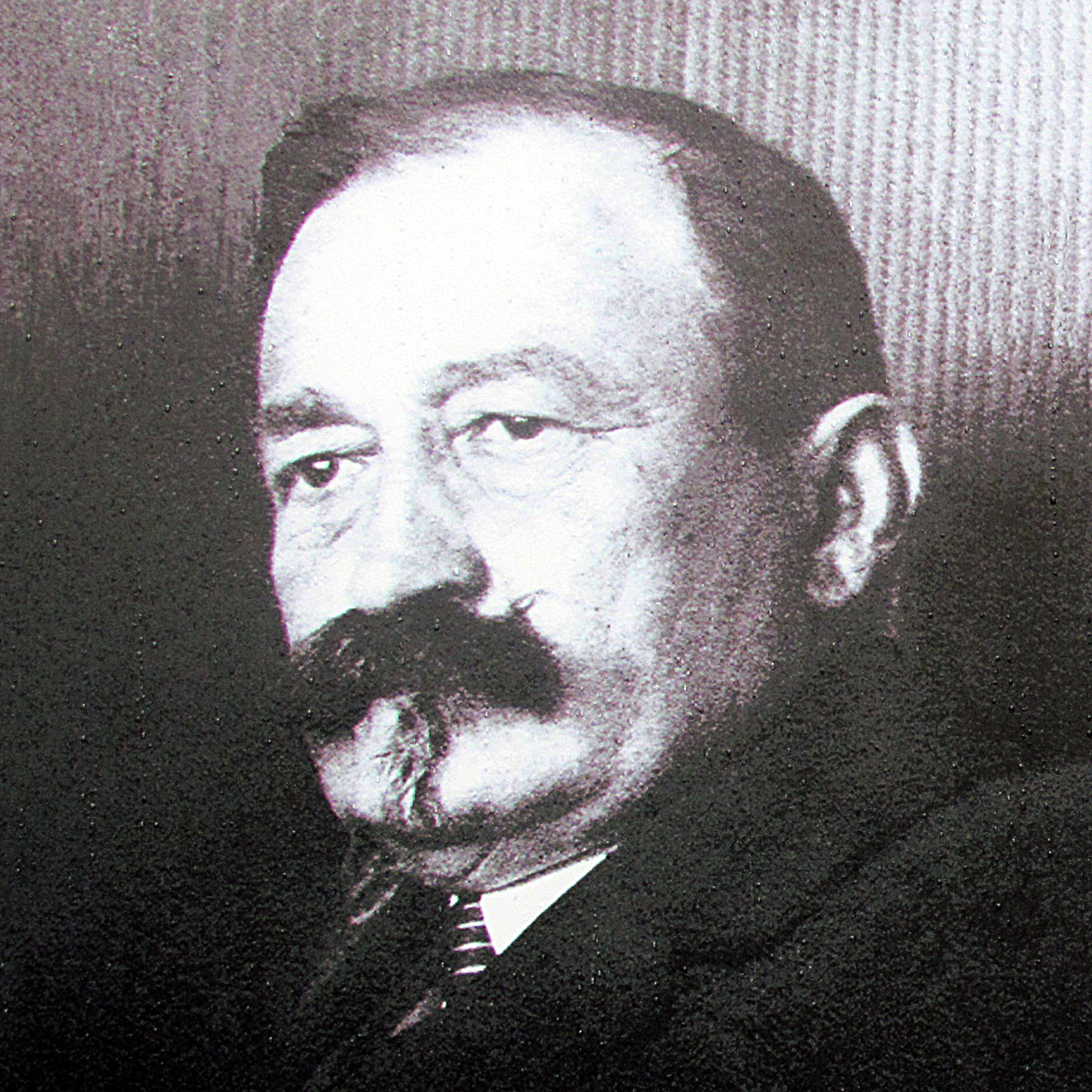
- Born: 4 October 1865; Belgrade, Principality of Serbia
- Died: 29 January 1957 (aged 91); Belgrade, Yugoslavia
- Occupations: novelist, publicist, translator
- Writing career
- Language: Serbian
- Period: Realism
- Notable work: A Witness to an Era

Milorad Pavlović — Krpa (Belgrade, 4 October 1865 — Belgrade, 29 January 1957) was a Serbian writer, publicist, translator, and editor and publisher of Glasnik za zabavu i nauku (Entertainment and Science Herald).

== Biography ==
While studying abroad, in the German Empire, his interest in the work of Anton Chekhov and Afanasy Fet led him to study the Russian language and try his hand in translating. He eventually translated several of Chekhov's short stories and novellas, entitled Čehovljeve pripovetke and Ruski ljudi (both published in 1890) and Fet's poetry. He also authored several books, including a memoir that appeared in 1963 in Belgrade's newspaper Politika entitled "A Witness to an Era."

== Works ==
- Slika i karakteri iz srpskoga društva (Picture and Characters from Serbian Society);
- Napuljska šetnja (Neapoletan Walks), 1911;
- Priče iz života kralja Petra (Stories from King Peter's Life), 1922;
- Kralj Aleksandar I Karađorđević u ratu i miru (King Alexander I Karadjordjević in War and Peace);
- Sunčana prašina (Sun's Dust), 1941–1944;
- Svedok jednog stoleća (A Witness to an Era), 1963
- Stevan Sremac (1936)
- Unique item: delta novel with a hundred endings
- Tvorci Srbije i Jugoslavije: Radovi Archdjakona Lukijana Bibića akademskog slikara (1941)
- Naš u ratu (1928)
- Anegdote iz života naših književnika i umetnika (1953).
