= Jovan Grčić Milenko =

Serbian poet, writer and physician

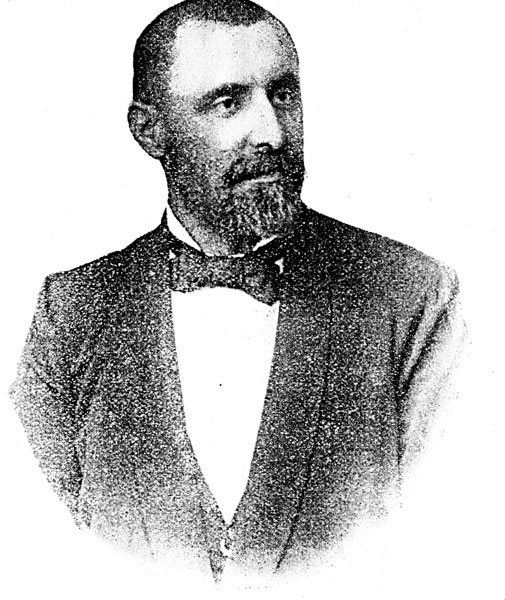
- Born: Jovan Grčić; 15 November 1846; Čerević, Austrian Empire
- Died: 25 May 1875 (aged 29); Fruška Gora, Kingdom of Hungary (modern-day Serbia)
- Education: University of Vienna
- Occupation: Poet

Jovan Grčić Milenko (Serbian Cyrillic: Јован Грчић Миленко; 15 November 1846 – 25 May 1875) was a Serbian poet, writer and a physician. The freshness of his lyrical poetry places him in the succession of Branko Radičević and he is also noted for his power of natural description. He translated Goethe, Schiller and Heine into Serbian, and his own poems into German.

== Biography ==
Jovan Grčić was born in the village of Čerević in the municipality of Beočin in Srem, Austrian Empire as the oldest of three children (Jovan, Djordje and Katica) of Todor and Ana Grcki. His family was of Greek origin. His father Todor, a merchant, died young (1850), leaving his wife to raise the children. Jovan was educated in Serbian in Čerević, and in German in Petrovaradin, Szeged and Pozun.

In 1863 Jovan Grčić began his brief but sensational career as a lyric poet. For a span of five years he wrote five books of poems and three short stories. He began with "Ne boj mi se" (Have no fear), a poem which appeared in the literary periodical Danica in 1863. He was a regular contributor with translations from German from 1864 to 1867.

Instead of proceeding to the university, he went to visit his parents back home, in Čerević. There he fell in love with the young Milena Stefanović, and through her parents he became acquainted with physician and poet Jovan Jovanović Zmaj, Milan Kujundžić-Aberdar, Laza Kostić and other men of letters of the time.

Milena Stefanović died suddenly at the age of 16, while Jovan was away preparing for his medical studies in Pozun. Shocked and horrified by Milena's sudden death, he began seriously writing poems, dedicating an entire cycle of poems to her memory. He wrote: "From your name 'Mileno' .... I baptize myself 'Milenko'."

He would eventually change his surname Grčki to Grčić and add his first love's name to his. It was from then on that he was known as Jovan Grčić-Milenko. In 1867 he moved from Pozun to Vienna to continue his medical studies at the University of Vienna's School of Medicine. There he became seriously ill and had to drop out before graduating. In 1873 he returned to his native village of Čerević, but his tuberculosis progressed so much so that Abbot German, a friend of the family, intervened and took Jovan to the Beočin monastery, where he could receive better clinical care than at home. He died in the Beočin monastery in Fruska Gora on 25 May 1875 at the age of 29. He was buried near the entrance of the monastery. The funeral was attended by his medical colleagues, Jovan Jovanović Zmaj, Ilija Ognjenović-Abukazem, Lazar Stanojević and others.

== Prose and influences ==
He was best known for his lyrical poetry than his prose. However, he also wrote three extremely well-written short stories with fantastic elements which are: U gostionici kod Poluzvezde na imendanu šantavog torbara (1868); Sremska ruža (1868-1869); and Zmijina košuljica (Matica, 1868). All three short stories were printed and distributed by the publishing house of Matica srpska in Novi Sad under the supervision of Antonije Hadžić.

Analyzing the fantastic stories of Jovan Grčić-Milenko with reference to Nikolai Gogol and E. T. A. Hoffmann, the similarity between Gogol and Grcic is not an essential one. It originates from the imperative of time and the political orientation of Grčić Milenko and especially from the use of similar sources: folk fantastic and folk beliefs.

The similarities between Grčić and Hoffmann is more general. It cannot be seen at once, but many components of the fantastic are common to both writers. These are: the protagonists feeling being cut off from the others and being exceptional, the feeling of foreboding, and complete interaction between the plot, the main hero and nature. These similarities are not found in single parts of the stories but throughout the narrative.

== Legacy ==
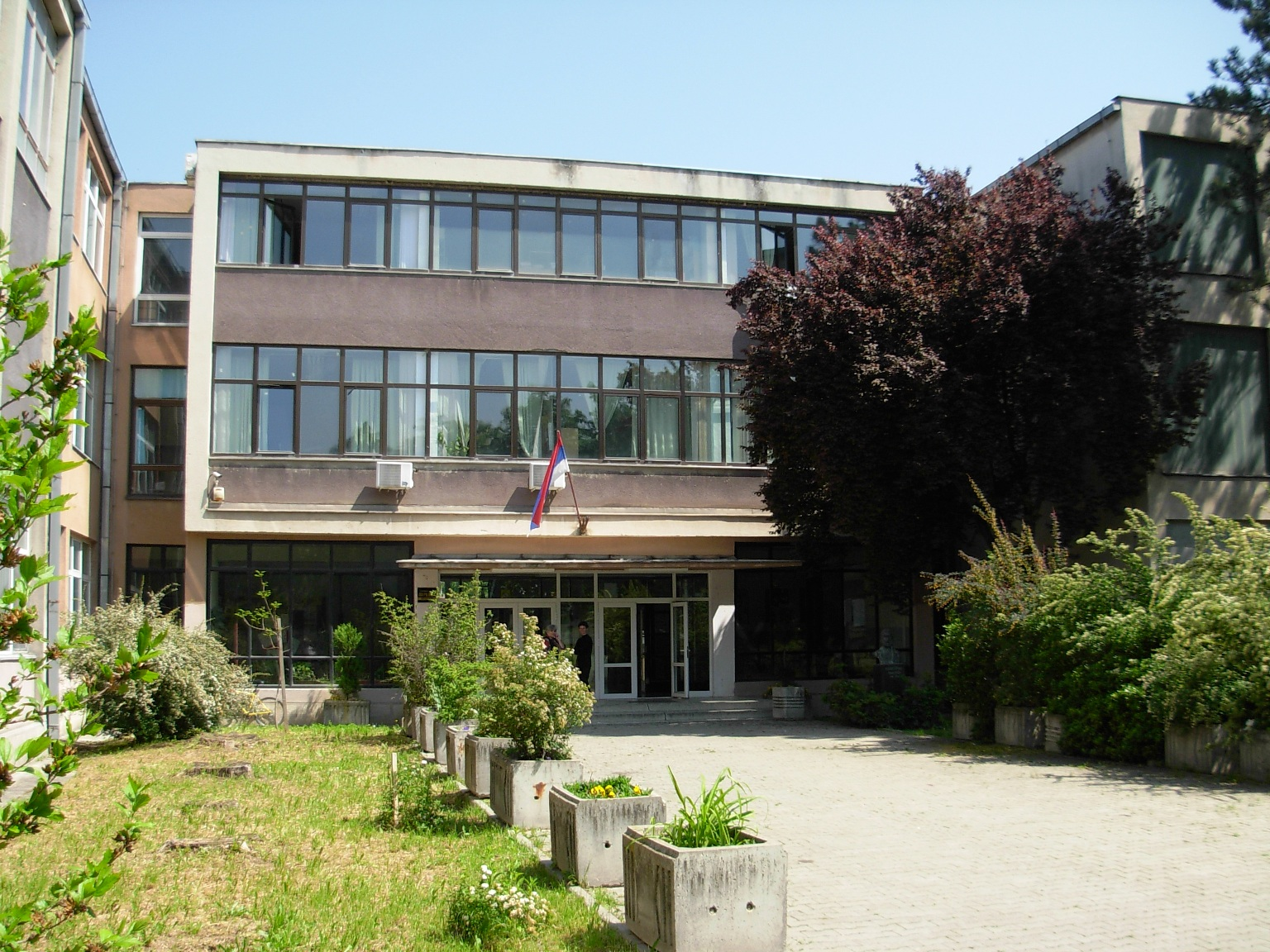
Elementary school Jovan Grčić Milenko, Beočin

He has been called a "Nightingale of Fruška Gora", for his lyrical work. A selection of his works has been included in various anthologies and literary histories, such as the Anthology of Modern Serbian Lyric. A school in his hometown is named after him.

== Selected works ==
- Pesme. Spevao ih Milenko (1869)
- U gostionici kod 'Polu zvezde' na imendan šantavog torbara (1868)
- Sremska ruža (1868-1869)
- Mozaik (1875-1876)

== Sources ==
- Skerlić, Jovan (1953). Istorija nove srpske književnosti (Third ed.). Rad.
- Kašanin, Milan. Jovan Grčić Milenko. Život i rad. Biblioteka srpskih pisaca.
