= Erlangen Manuscript =

Erlangen Manuscript (Serbian: Ерлангенски рукопис) is a Serbian Cyrillic manuscript dated between 1716 and 1733 that contains one of the earliest written collections (217 songs) of epic poetry written in the Serbian language. The unnamed author wrote the manuscript for the Austrian military commander Prince Eugene of Savoy, a governor in Habsburg-occupied Serbia. It was discovered in 1913 by the Germanist Elias von Steinmeyer in the University Library in Erlangen and studied in depth by Gerhard Gesemann who used it for his habilitation in 1921. It was first published to the public in Sremski Karlovci in 1925.

The Erlangen Manuscript is a mixture of Christian and Muslim songs. Estimates of the number of Muslim songs vary between 36 and 46.

== Sources ==
- Medenica, Radosav; Aranitović, Dobrilo, eds. (1987). "Erlangenski rukopis : zbornik starih srpskohrvatskih narodnih pesama [Erlangen Manuscript of old Serbo-Croatian folk songs]" (in Serbian). Nikšić: Univerzitetska riječ. pp. 13, 18, 23. OCLC 19594104. "... tipičan mešoviti zbornik muslimanskih i hrišćanskih pesama...Dok je D. Prohaska...pronašao u zborniku 36 pesama od kojih devet nosi obeležja muslimanskih pevača, Krnjević je našla deset više, dakle 46 ... da je Erlangenski rukopis rađen za vrhovnu upravu okupirane Srbije, odnosno za njenog vrhovnog starešinu i vojskovođu, princa Evgenija Savojskog... da se ličnost talentovanog pisara ne može i neće možda nikada moći da se otkrije..."
- Kleut, Marija N. (2015). "About the origins and destiny of the Erlangen Manuscript". Južnoslovenski Filolog. 71 (3–4): 29–42. doi:10.2298/JFI1504029K.
