= Jovan Skerlić =

Serbian writer and critic (1877–1914)

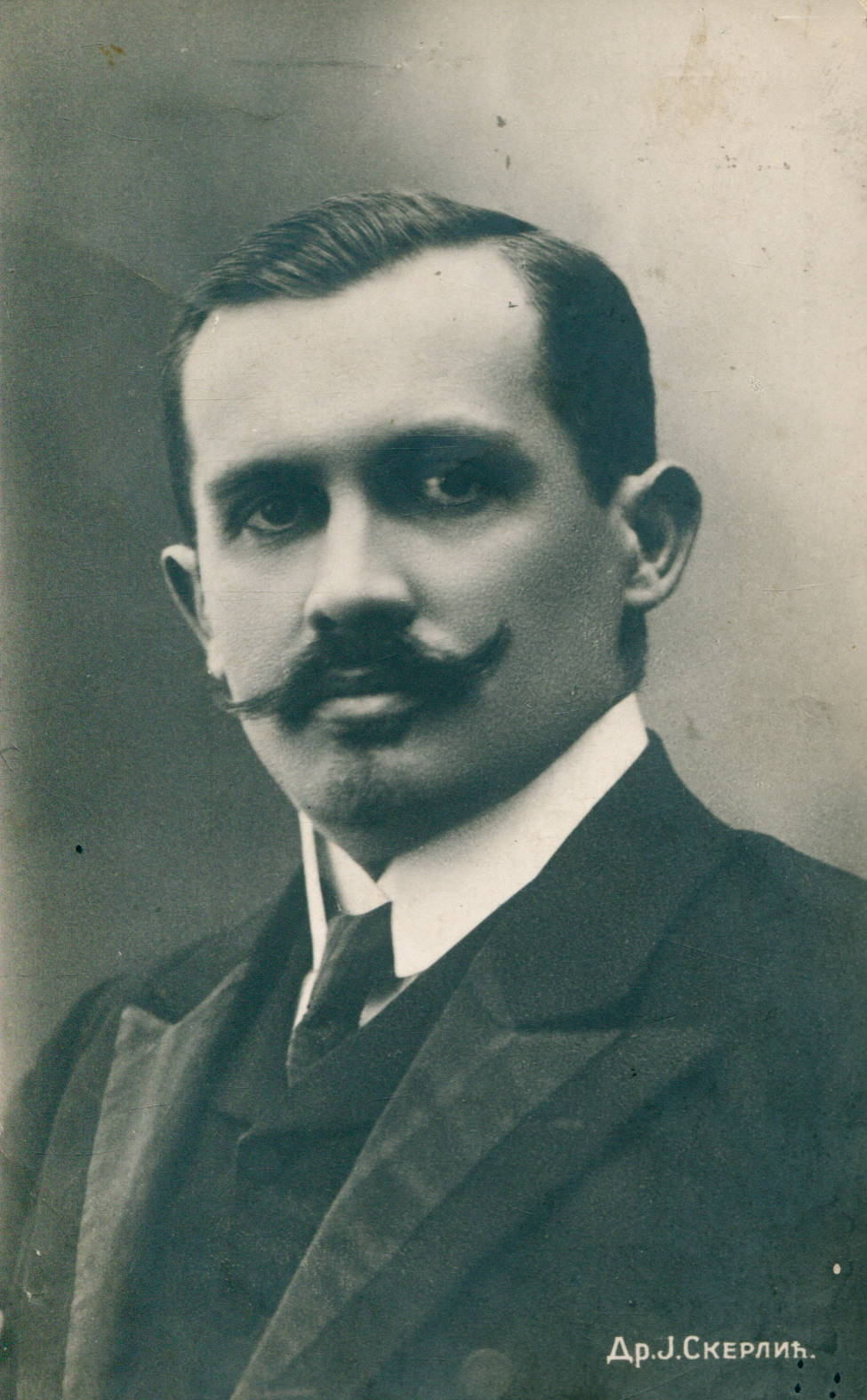
- Born: 20 August 1877; Belgrade, Principality of Serbia
- Died: 15 May 1914 (aged 36); Belgrade, Kingdom of Serbia
- Occupations: Writer and critic

Jovan Skerlić (Serbian Cyrillic: Јован Скерлић, pronounced [jǒʋan skêːrlitɕ]; 20 August 1877 – 15 May 1914) was a Serbian writer and literary critic. He is seen as one of the most influential Serbian literary critics of the early 20th century, after Bogdan Popović, his professor and early mentor.

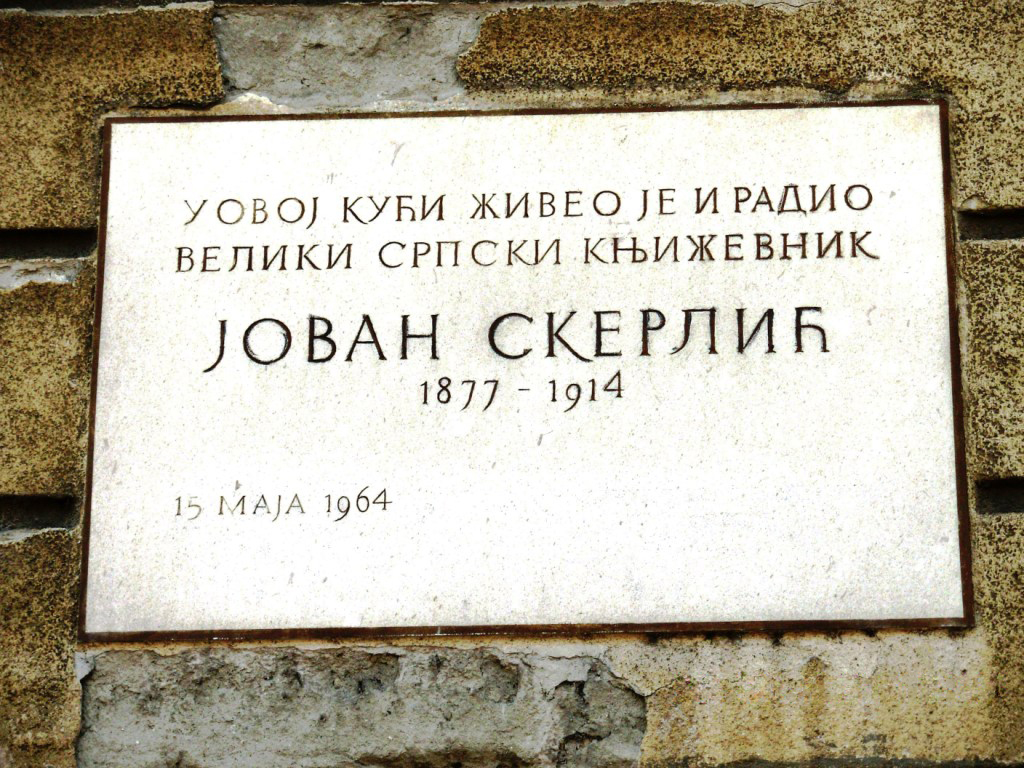
Memorial tablet on the house where Jovan Skerlić lived, in the Gospodar Jovanova street, Belgrade, Serbia

Skerlić was buried in the Novo groblje cemetery in Belgrade.

== Biography ==
Skerlić's paternal family hailed from Šumadija while his maternal family hailed from Vojvodina. Already in high school he got interested in socialist ideas of Svetozar Marković and joined various groups and publications. In 1895 he enrolled into the Grand School of Belgrade where he was strongly influenced by French language and comparative literature course held by Bogdan Popović. During the university education he initiated correspondence with foreign socialist including professor Georges Renard (1847-1930) at the University of Lausanne. He graduated in 1899 when he moved to Lausanne in Switzerland to work on his doctoral dissertation subsequently moving to Paris where he spent a couple of months before returning to Belgrade.

In early 1904, Skerlić spent two months in Munich, then went to Paris again and returned to Belgrade in July 1904 where he received a job offer at the University of Belgrade in 1905 (he lost his job at the Grand School in 1903 for his political engagement). With secured tenure, Skerlić took the ambitious and voluminous projects of writing the authoritative history of contemporary Serbian literature. His opus magnum, the History of the Contemporary Serbian Literature (Istorija nove srpske književnosti), was completed two months before his early death in 1914.

== Bibliography ==
His collected works include:

- Pisci i knjige I
- Pisci i knjige II
- Pisci i knjige III
- Pisci i knjige IV
- Pisci i knjige V
- Pisci i knjige VI
- Feljtoni skice i govori
- Istorijski pregled srpske štampe 1791–1911
- Javno mnenje u Francuskoj prema političkoj i socijalnoj poeziji od 1830 do 1848.
- Srpska književnost u XVIII veku
- Omladina i njena književnost (1848–1871) izučavanja o nacionalnom i književnom romantizmu kod Srba
- Svetozar Marković njegov život, rad i ideje
- Jakov Ignjatović književna studija
- Istorija nove srpske književnosti
- Jovan Skerlić čovek i dela by dr Midhat Begić

== See also ==
- Svetozar Marković
- Andra Gavrilović
- Pavle Popović
- Bogdan Popović
- Branko Lazarević
- Ljubomir Nedić
- Milovan Glišić
- Stanislav Vinaver
- Bora Stanković

== Bibliography ==
- Midhat Begić, Jovan Skerlić et la critique littéraire en Serbie, Paris, Institut d’Études slaves 1963.
