= Vojislav Jovanović Marambo =

Vojislav M. Jovanović Marambo (October 12, 1884 – June 20, 1968) was a Serbian drama critic, playwright, historian, university professor, diplomat and research scholar. He first made a name for himself as a drama critic, playwright, and historian of literature with a particular emphasis on the study of folklore, then as a translator, journalist, bibliographer, archivist, diplomat, and above all a passionate collector of books and bibliophile. He is often ranked as one of the great playwrights in the tradition of European naturalism and a proponent of the kitchen sink drama, long before it became a trend in 1950.

== Works ==
- Naši sinovi (Our Sons), drama in four acts, with an epilogue, Mostar, 1907. Publisher: Štamparsko umjetnički zavod Pahera i Kisića. Kol. Mala biblioteka, knj. XXVIII, sv. 139/140.
- Karijera, comedy in three acts; Belgrade, Publisher: Gece Kona, 1914.
- Naš zet (Our Son-in-Law), drama in one-act; Belgrade, Publisher: Gece Kona, 1914.
- Naši očevi (Our Fathers), comedy in three-acts, Belgrade, Publisher: Gece Kona, 1914.
- Tako reče Zaratustra (Thus Spoke Zaratustra), drama in three-acts (editor Vaso Milinčević), Književna istorija, 1974, VI, 24, str. 703-739.
