= Bogdan Popović =

Serbian literary critic (1863–1944)

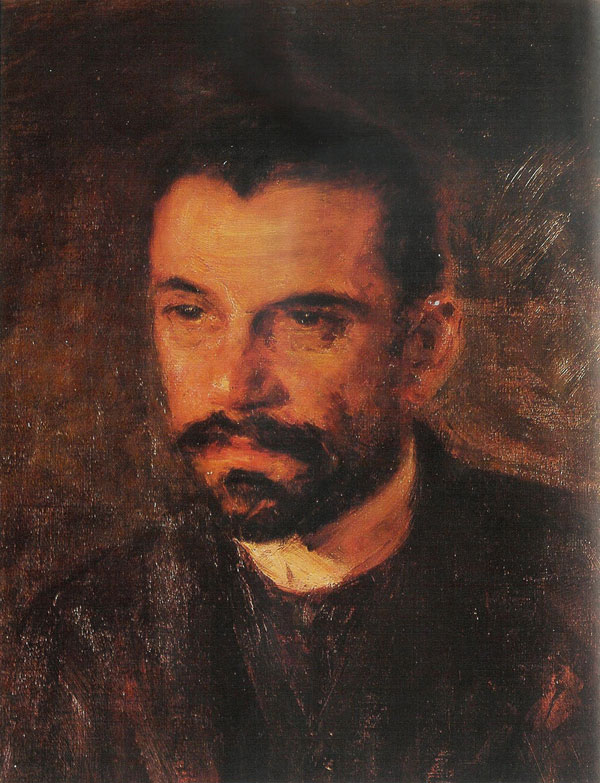
- Portrait of Bogdan Popović by Rista Vukanović
- Born: 20 December 1863; Belgrade, Principality of Serbia
- Died: 7 November 1944 (aged 80); Belgrade, Yugoslavia
- Occupation: literary critic

Bogdan Popović (Serbian Cyrillic: Богдан Поповић; 20 December 1863 – 7 November 1944) was Serbian university professor, literary critic and academic. He was one of the most important literary critics and university professors in Serbia.

== Biography ==
Pavle Popović, his brother, was also a professor of Serbian Literature at the University of Belgrade.

Popović studied literature and philosophy at both Belgrade's Velika škola and at the University of Paris. Returning home in 1893, he became a professor at his alma mater, and twelve years later when the Velika škola became accredited as the University of Belgrade he continued teaching French, comparative literature, literary theory and aesthetics until his retirement in 1934.

In 1911, he published his Anthology of Modern Serbian Lyric (Antologija novije srpske lirike), the first attempt to create a literary canon of the most significant poems down the ages. He chose examples that reveal a constant and highly developed poetic expression as the hallmark of Serbian literary achievement. He was the first to distance poetry from folk heritage, proposing an alternative view of sophisticated forms with a broad poetic range and insight into the kind of understanding art offers.

Popović founded the Serbian Literary Herald (Srpski književni glasnik) in 1901, the most prestigious literary magazine in Serbia. Jovan Skerlić who died suddenly on the eve of World War I, was one of Popović best pupils at the Velika škola, and later, one of his closest collaborators and colleagues. Skerlić then went on to join Popović's editorial board of the Serbian Literary Herald, becoming chief editor for a time.

He was a man of broad culture and great erudition, and is regarded as the first Serbian critic to engage simultaneously in both literary and art criticism. In writing his critiques, he applied his own methodology.

As a result of Popović's work at the university and the literary journal, he was admitted to the Serbian Royal Academy of Arts (now known as the Serbian Academy of Sciences and Arts) on 3 February 1914. He was the secretary of the Academy of Arts from 6 March 1928 to 7 March 1931.

Popović was one of the founders of the Serbian PEN Club, a branch of International PEN. He was also an art critic.

He died in his hometown of Belgrade on 7 November 1944.

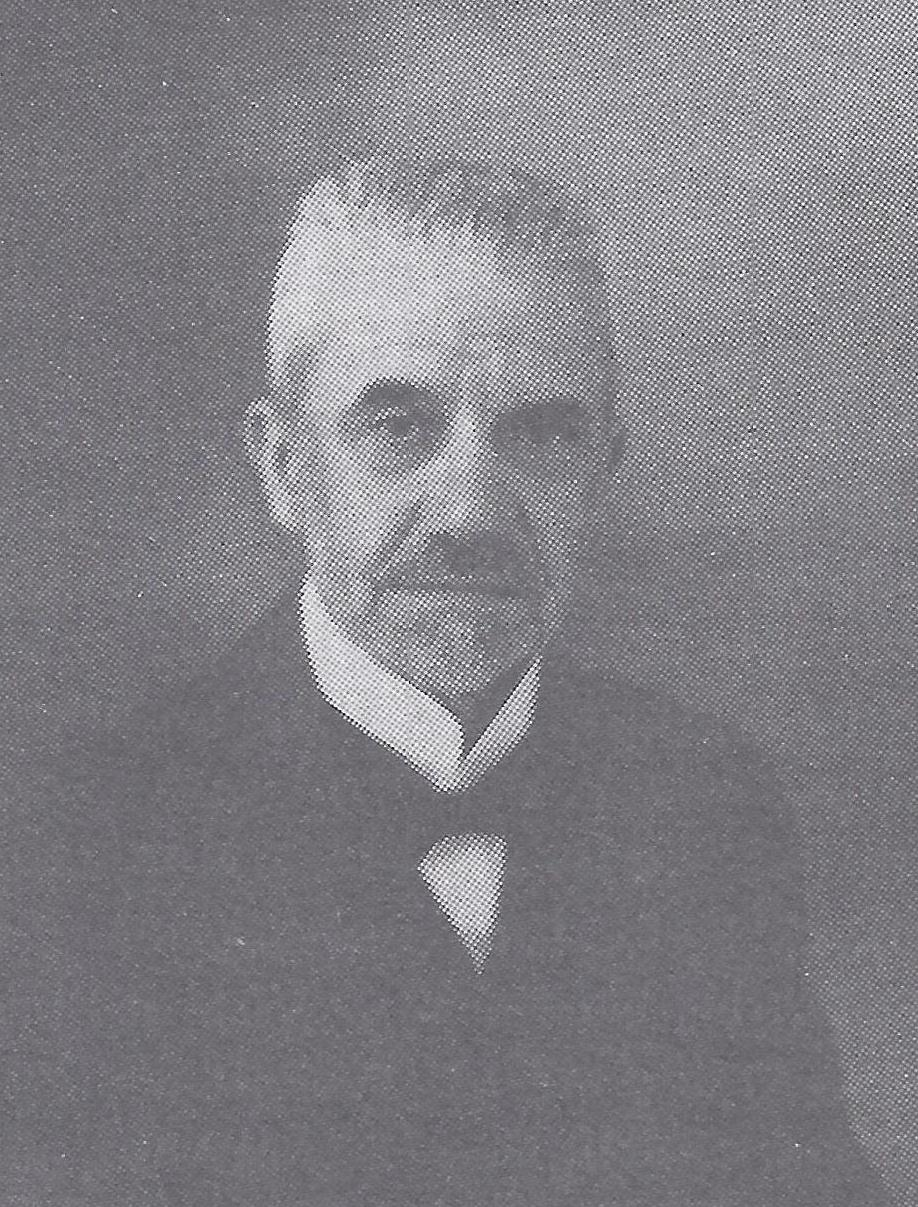
A photo of Popović.

== Personal life ==
Bogdan Popović was the unfulfilled young love of Draga Mašin, née Milićević Lunjevica, the tragic wife of Alexander I of Serbia.

== Legacy ==
His published works were published in 6 volumes.

He is included in The 100 most prominent Serbs.

== Selected works ==
- O vaspitanju ukusa, 1895
- Gordana... dr Laze Kostića, 1899
- O Gorskom vijencu, 1900
- Jedan srpski pripovedač: Sv. Ćorović, 1901
- Alegorična satirična priča, 1902
- Šta je velikki pesnik, 1904
- Iz književnosti, I–IV, 1906–38
- Šekspir ili Bekon, 1907
- Pregled srpske književnosti, 1909
- Antologija novije srpske lirike, 1911
- Jugoslovenska književnost, 1918
- Bomarše, biography, 1925
- Članci i predavanja o književnosti, umetnosti, jeziku i moralu, essays and articles, 1932
- Milovan Vidaković, 1934

== Sources ==
- Jovan Skerlić, Istorija nove srpske književnosti / A History of Modern Serbian Literature (Belgrade, 1921) pages 479-482

Academic offices
Preceded by ?	Dean of the Faculty of Philosophy; 1905–1906	Succeeded by Svetolik Radovanović
