= Pavlović Family House =

Coordinates: 44.8200°N 20.4609°E

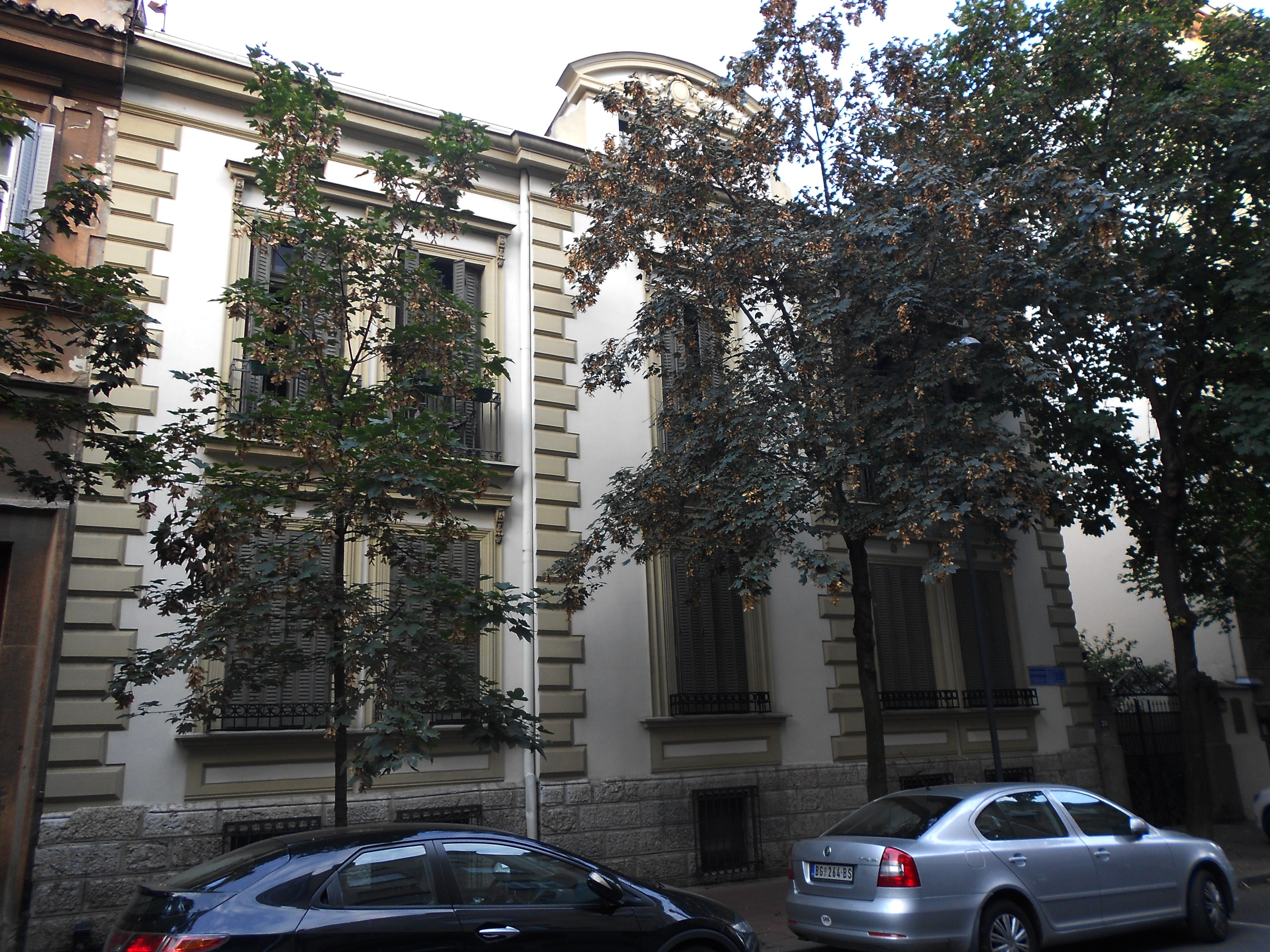

Pavlović`s family house family is situated in Belgrade, at 39 Gospodar Jevremova Street, and it has the status of the cultural monument. The house was built in 1882as a ground-floor family house of Kosta St. Pavlović, then head of the department of the Ministry of Foreign Affairs and the former mayor of Niš after the liberation from Ottoman rule. Before the very building of the house, Kosta Pavlović along with the professor Ljuba Kovačević and the general Јovan Mišković (latter presidents of Serbian Royal Academy) bought the lots in a row, on the bank of the Danube. Up to now, there are "testimonies“ of the mayor Ž.M.Blaznavac about the purchase of the lots.

== The design of Jevremova Street in Belgrade ==
The family house of Kosta and Anka Pavlović was among the first urban houses in Jevremova Street, conceptualized in pro-European architectural manner, built in 1882. At that time it was one of the largest lots on the Danube slope which Kosta, the first mayor of the town of Niš and the head of the department of the ministry of foreign affairs, bought with the dowry of his wife Anka née Aćimović. The adjacent lots were purchased by Ljuba Kovačević, the professor at the Great School and a politician, and Jovan Mišković, an army general and a member of the Royal Serbian Academy. After the reshaping of the city layout carried out according to the first urban plan made by Emilijan Josimović, those three were the largest lots in Jevremova Street. During his term as the mayor of the City of Niš, in 1878, Kosta Pavlović issued a decree on the organization of the city, and after his arrival to Belgrade, he paid a special attention to decorating not only his home, but also the street he lived in, so therefore he worked on decorating the terrain, he hired workers to carry the ground from the Terazije in order to even the slope of the lot towards the street, he paved the sidewalk in front of his house with cobblestones, which was considered to be the first private investment in the city infrastructure. Until the First World War it was a quiet residential street with the alley of trees and with almost no merchant stores, with ground-floor houses which reflected the European architecture and the life style.

== The Architecture ==
The house was built using the construction method typical for the late 19th century, the bricks bounded with lime mortar with massive walls spanned with shallow segmental vaults. The outside was designed in classicist manner. It had five rooms and a large entrance hall. In the semi-basement there was a kitchen and another room. The house was damaged in the First World War, and then repaired in 1927, when the upper floor and the attic were added according to the design done by the architect Aleksandar Sekulić, conformed to the original architectural concept of the object. The facades were restored uniformly, in the style of academism with decorative elements such as pilasters, brackets, cornices and window surrounds. The verticality of the facade was achieved by the use of the quoins along the edge of the building, central projections (Avant-corps) and windows built in the form of a door with decorative iron railings like French balcony. The main carriage passageway, which remained from the time of construction, consisted of two pillars and an iron gate. The entrance to the house from the backyard is on the side facade. There are two extensions from the backyard side according to the design of the architect Dragomir Tadić. In 2004, the garden of the Pavlović family was declared for one of the best decorated gardens in Municipality Stari Grad, and it represents the true floral oasis in the centre of Belgrade.

== The venue of the city life ==
In the representative salons of the Pavlović`s family house the meetings were organized of the members of the Royal family and diplomatic corps, as well as the artists and scientists, among which there were: Stojan Novaković, Јоvan Cvijić, Јеvrem Grujić, Sima Lozanić, Nikola Pašić, Мilenko Vesnić, Мihajlo Petrović Alas, Beta Vukanović, Тоma Rosandić, Ivan Meštrović, Јоvan Dučić, Milan Rakić and others. After the Second World War there came a difficult period for the pre-war bourgeoisie and the intellectual elite. The family managed to save the house from being nationalised. The attic was the venue for the regular meetings of the oldest visual artists association „Lada“, and some of the participants were Petar Lubarda, Мihajlo Tomić, Cuca Sokić, Zuko Džumhur, Vlada Veličković and others. After the Second World War, the first floor was the place where the meetings of the conservators of the cultural heritage of Serbia and the members of the international committee for national construction ICOMOS and UNRESCO were held.

== The important persons ==
The famous members of Pavlović family, who marked the cultural and political life in Serbia by their work and social commitment were Kosta St. Pavlović, the mayor of Niš, his wife Anka, the founder and the first head of the Female Association in Niš; their son, Stevan Pavlović, a jurist and a diplomat, the assistant of the Minister of the Foreign Affairs, the Holder of the Legion of Honour, the president of the Association of the French friends; their grandson Kosta Pavlović, a diplomat and a head of the cabinet of the Prime Minister Dušan Simović and Slobodan Jovanović; their granddaughter Leposava – Bela, an academic painter, a French language professor, a lector and an associate of SANU and the lifelong president of „Lada“; their grandson Dobroslav – Bojko, prof.dr. architect conservator, one of the founders of the Conservator Association in our country, the holder of the Order of St. Sava of first class. The Pavlović family donated part of their artistic treasure to the institutions of culture and education, National Museum in Belgrade, The Gallery Beljanski and Matica Srpska in Novi Sad, and the bigger part of their library to the Eparchy of Šumadija in Kragujevac. In 2003, the today`s descendants used a conservatory approach and cleaned the three-coloured four leaf and the year of 1882 which were engraved in the floor mosaic in the entrance hall. At the beginning of the 2000s, in the basement of the House, the Cultural centre was founded, with the permanent exhibition display which represents the rich collection of artistic and ethnological items and documents of the six generations of the Pavlović family which was, and still is made of: diplomats, ministers, lawyers, translators and artists. The collection includes the rich archive, the old photographs with dedications, diplomas, orders, and tokens of appreciation and merit, pieces of historical clothing typically worn in urban environments, picturesque traditional costumes, archaic objects and furniture and other objects from the everyday life in the 19th and early 20th century.
