= Birthplace of Svetozar Ćorović =

History museums in Bosnia and Herzegovina

Coordinates: 43°20′09.3″N 17°48′59.5″E

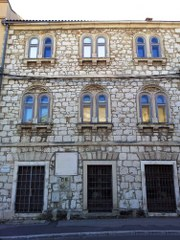
Svetozar Corovic House

The house where Svetozar Ćorović was born has been transformed into a writer's home museum. The museum is located in Mostar, Bosnia and Herzegovina. Svetozar Ćorović is one of the most important Herzegovina novelists who often wrote of life in Herzegovina region and in Mostar, is located at Mostar's 178, Maršala Tita Street, close to the Muyaga Komadina Bridge (or Lucki Bridge). It was constructed in 1874 in a somewhat unusual Neo-Renaissance style. The building style was also inspired by the Dalmatian architecture.

Aleksa Šantić, one of the country's greatest poets, also lived here during the last years of his life. The building houses a room dedicated to his memory with a library collection containing his precious manuscripts.

The city honors Šantić by holding poetry reading evenings, the Šantićeve večeri poezije, an event much which has taken place every year for the past twenty three years.
