= Anurag Anand =

Indian author

- Born: 2 November 1978 (age 48); Patna, Bihar, India
- Occupations: Novelist, artist, author, banker, marketer
- Spouse: Neeru Sharma Anand
- Children: Naisha Anand
- Writing career
- Genres: Fiction, historical fiction, Motivational
- Website: anuraganand.in

Anurag Anand (born 2 November 1978) is an Indian artist, corporate professional, and author, with several bestselling titles in the self-help, general fiction, and historical fiction genres. His corporate experience spans across the pharmaceutical, fast-moving consumer goods, and financial services industries.

== Education ==
After obtaining his primary education from Kurseong in Darjeeling District, Anand moved to Delhi. He completed his schooling at Delhi Public School, Mathura Road, New Delhi, in 1996. Anand gained his B. A. (Hons) in Economics from Delhi University before undertaking his PGDBM (Post Graduate Diploma in Management) at the Lal Bahadur Shastri Institute of Management, Delhi from 2000 to 2002.

== Career ==
Anand initiated his writing career with the release of "Pillars of Success"' in 2004, a self-help book based on his association with the Delhi-based NGO, UNES, during his college years. During his involvement with UNES's Youth Development Program, Anand delivered lectures on various aspects of personality development to students across the country, and these interactions served as the foundation for his debut book.

Since then, Anand has also written general fiction and historical fiction novels. Anand's articles and columns have been published in several major publications. His monthly column, "Corporate Whispers," gained recognition through its publication in Suburb Live magazine.

Anand also wrote a song, titled "Bhaga", which serves as the theme song for his book To Hell and Back (2018). The song has been arranged and sung by the popular music director Ram Sampath.

== Awards ==
In 2016, Anand was awarded the Lal Bahadur Shastri Award for Corporate Excellence for his achievements in the corporate world. The award was presented by Air Chief Marshal S.K. Sareen, former Indian Air Force Chief, and Anil Shastri, former Union Minister.

In February 2019, Anand was named among the Top HR 40under40 leaders in the country at the Leading From Behind Summit. He was also recognized among the Role Players – 2019 by the World Training and Development Congress.

In the 2024 edition of ET HR WORLD Future Skills Awards Anurag won the Gold in "L&D Leaders (Heads & CLOs)" category.

== Bibliography ==
Non-Fiction

- Pillars of Success (2004)
- Corporate Mantras (2007)

Fiction

- Tic Toc – A tale of love, hate and terror (2009); ISBN 978-9380151007

The book is a story of a common man's hatred for terrorism. The book was launched in Mumbai by acclaimed filmmaker Mahesh Bhatt.

- The Quest for Nothing (2010); ISBN 978-9380349206

A contemporary story of a young and ambitious couple and the conflict between their personal aspirations and career goals, The Quest for Nothing was declared a National Bestseller within six months of its release. The book was launched by a panel comprising Pritish Nandy, Gul Panag, and Mini Mathur.

- Reality Bites (2011); ISBN 978-9380349374

Reality Bites is a youthful love story set in a high school hostel. The book was launched at Landmark, Mumbai, by Bollywood personalities including Sudhir Mishra, Randeep Hooda and Kanishtha Dhankhar (Femina Miss India World 2011).

- The Legend of Amrapali (2012); ISBN 978-9380349473

A work of historical fiction giving a life account of the courtesan Amrapali who lived in the kingdom of Vaishali around 500 BC. The book was launched in Mumbai, New Delhi, Kolkata, and Ahmedabad by panellists comprising Prahlad Kakkar, Bhagyashree, Mallika Sarabhai, Shashi Tharoor, Sonalika Sahay, Indrani Dasgupta, and Alokananda Roy.

- Of Tattoos and Taboos! (2009); ISBN 978-9380349619

A contemporary story that traces the transition of an innocent, small-town girl into a modern, fiercely independent, big-city belle.

- Where The Rainbow (2013); ISBN 978-9382665014

Where the Rainbow Ends is a fictional tale that aims to spread awareness around cervical cancer.

- Birth of The Bastard Prince (2014); ISBN 8129134543

In Birth of the Bastard Prince, is the sequel to The Legend of Amrapali, and both are stories of royal intrigue.

- Love on 3 Wheels (2015); ISBN 978-9382665588 Love on 3 Wheels is a romantic thriller set in the streets of Delhi over a three-day period.
- To Hell and Back (2018); ISBN 978-9385854620
- The Assassination of Rajat Gandy (2018); ISBN 978-9385854712
- Once Upon a Lockdown (2020); ASIN B08C7FKKJJ A collection of stories from the Covid-19 lockdowns in India.
- The Crimson Throne of Mahoba (2023); ISBN 978-9395106047
- Operation Bamboo Garden (2024); ISBN 978-8119670307 Operation Bamboo Garden is a pacy spy thriller which is centered around the complexities of the fast-changing world order.

== Art ==
Anurag is a well-known visual artist whose art is known for its rustic, earthly palette and cerebral messaging.

Anurag's artistic journey began at a young age, where he would find himself filling up his school notebook pages with doodles. He believes that art and writing are important mediums of expression for him, with art being more spontaneous and unrestrained. Anurag's art has been exhibited at several prominent galleries and collections across the globe. His solo exhibition at AIFACS, New Delhi in 2023, was inaugurated by Padmashri sculptor Biman Das, ambassador and writer Dr. Amarendra Khatua and other eminent personalities from the art and design industry.

In 2022, Anurag received the Bangiya Kala Upaasnaa Award for his artistic excellence.

== Media ==
Anand's works have been covered in all forms of media, including most national dailies and magazines. He has been invited to various television news channels like CNN IBN and UTV Bloomberg to participate in panel discussions and debates. He has also been invited by FM Radio channels like Radio Mirchi, Radio City, and Red FM for on-air discussions.

== Family ==
Anurag Anand lives in Gurugram with his wife Neeru and daughter Naisha. Anurag met Neeru while pursuing his higher studies in Delhi. Neeru Anand works with a Multinational Pharmaceutical company.

== See also ==
- List of Indian writers
- List of Indian artists
