= Poet-diplomat =

Poets who have served as diplomats

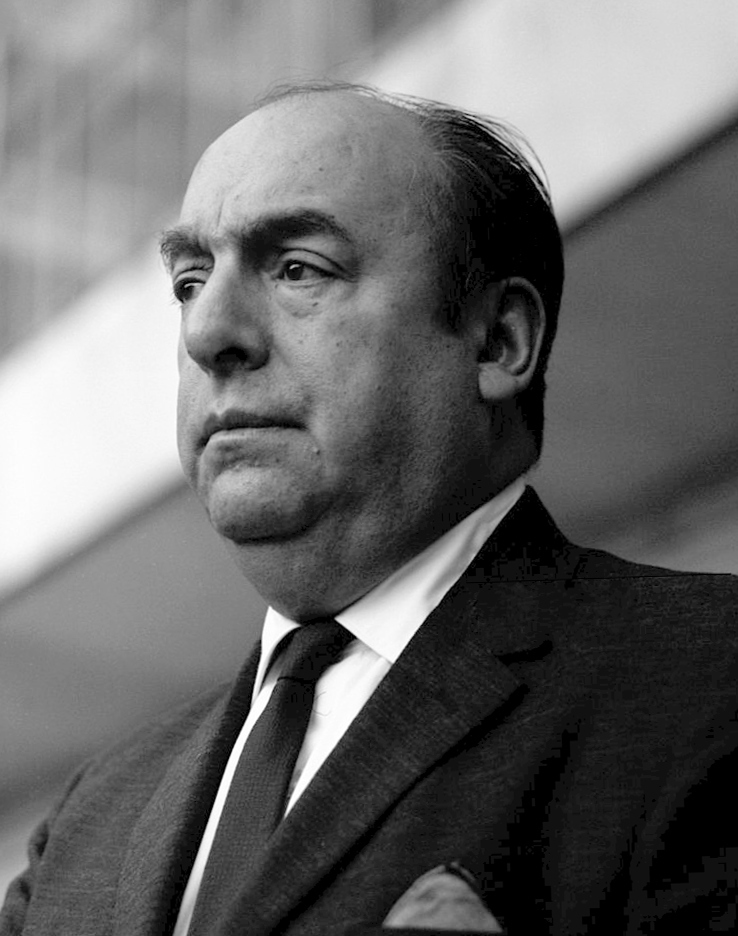
Pablo Neruda

Poet-diplomats are poets who have also served their countries as diplomats. In the Anglo-Saxon world, the best known poet-diplomats are perhaps Geoffrey Chaucer and Thomas Wyatt; the category also includes recipients of the Nobel Prize in Literature: Ivo Andrić, Gabriela Mistral, Saint-John Perse, Miguel Ángel Asturias, Pablo Neruda, George Seferis, Czesław Miłosz and Octavio Paz. Contemporary poet-diplomats include Abhay K, Indran Amirthanayagam, Kofi Awoonor, Philip McDonagh and Yiorgos Chouliaras.

== Overview ==
Abhay Kumar wrote, "There seems to be a connection between poetry and diplomacy as several diplomats over the ages have excelled in poetry". He further adds, "Diplomacy is a complex art that involves the mixing of political acumen, cultural finesse, language abilities and conversation skills to wield the power of persuasion. Diplomacy is generally conducted in short sentences which reveal as much as much [sic] they hide. Poetry is no different". He adds that poetry and diplomacy share a few attributes such as ambiguity and brevity in expressions, a detached handling of the subject matter among others.

Aldo Matteucci wrote, "Many diplomats have used poetry in their diplomatic work: wrapping words in silk is the diplomat’s job. A diplomat may turn a lie into a ‘constructive ambiguity’ – which is a way of defining poetry. Some poets have been diplomats – Neruda, Claudel, Saint-John Perse (1960 Nobel Prize in Literature). It’s an occupational hazard: the stimulating place, the sheltered existence – and the ability to paraphrase the unknowable. Few diplomats will admit to using poetry as a survival strategy".

Kamel S. Abu Jaber wrote,"The language of diplomacy, often like poetry, has the ability to move people from mood to mood".

Stefano Baldi and Pasquale Baldocci wrote in their book Through the Diplomatic Looking Glass,"The publication of poetry by diplomats seems more inspired by an inner need to express oneself freely than the wish to share sensations and feelings developed during the career. Only verses with their detachment from reality can present an escape from cold and bureaucratic style often imposed by the profession".

Brazil bestowed the rank of Ambassador posthumously to its poet-diplomat Vinicius de Moraes recognizing his poetic talent.

Russian diplomats have a curious obsession with poetry. “Poets and diplomats use the same building blocks: the idea and the word,” said Vladimir Kazimirov.

“Poetry and diplomacy both rely on the alchemy of paradox. We mix fear and hope, power and weakness, love and hate to find a way out of the impossible,” said Dominique de Villepin, French Foreign Minister and a published poet in July 2002.

== Notable poet-diplomats ==
- José Asunción Silva
- Rubén Darío
- Carlos Fuentes
- Abe no Nakamaro
- Jovan Dučić
- Giovanni Boccaccio
- Thomas Wyatt
- Diego Hurtado de Mendoza
- Constantijn Huygens
- Matthew Prior
- Joel Barlow
- Valentin Iremonger
- Nizar Qabbani
- Ahmed Fouad Shennib
- Abioseh Davidson Nicol
- Eduardo Cote Lamus
- Shathel Taqa
- Salah Stétié
- David Rubadiri
- Salah Ahmed Ibrahim
- John Weston
- Li Zhaoxing
- Homero Aridjis
- Ljubomir Nedić
- Reda Mansour
- Aleksander Griboyedov
- George Henry Boker
- Robert Bulwer-Lytton
- Abd al Aziz al-Amawi
- Wilfrid Scawen Blunt
- Luís Caetano Pereira Guimarães Júnior
- James Rennell Rodd
- Elena Vacarescu
- Émile Martel
- Félix Rubén García Sarmiento
- Paul Claudel
- Pablo Neruda
- Miguel Ángel Asturias
- James Weldon Johnson
- Abdul Hadi Dawai
- José Gorostiza Alcalá
- Jorge Carrera Andrade
- Denis Devlin
- Vinicius de Moraes
- Peter Zsoldos
- Milan Rakić
- Jānis Peters
- Miloš Crnjanski
- Ivo Andrić
- Joao Cabral de Melo Neto
- Abdülhak Hamit Tarhan
- Yahya Kemal Beyatlı
- Yamanoue no Okura
- Rosario Castellanos
- João Guimarães Rosa

== Poet-Ambassadors ==
These poets have also served as Ambassadors of their countries

- Thomas Wyatt: He was an Ambassador in the service of Henry VIII
- Pablo Neruda: He served as Ambassador of Chile to France from 1970-1972.
- Octavio Paz: He served as Ambassador of Mexico to India from 1962-1968.
- George Seferis: He served as Ambassador of Greece to UK from 1957-1962.
- Saint-John Perse: He was given the rank of Ambassador of France in 1950 but did not serve as Ambassador to any country.
- Abhay K: He is India's 21st Ambassador to Madagascar with concurrent accreditation to Comoros.
- Amarendra Khatua: He served as India's Ambassador and High Commissioner to Argentina, Uruguay, Paraguay, Ivory Coast, Sierra Leone, Guinea and Liberia.
- Dora Vasconcellos: She served as the Brazilian ambassador to Trinidad and Tobago from 1970 to her death.
- Yahya Kemal Beyatlı: He served as Ambassador of Turkey to Poland, Portugal and Pakistan.
