= Zora (magazine) =

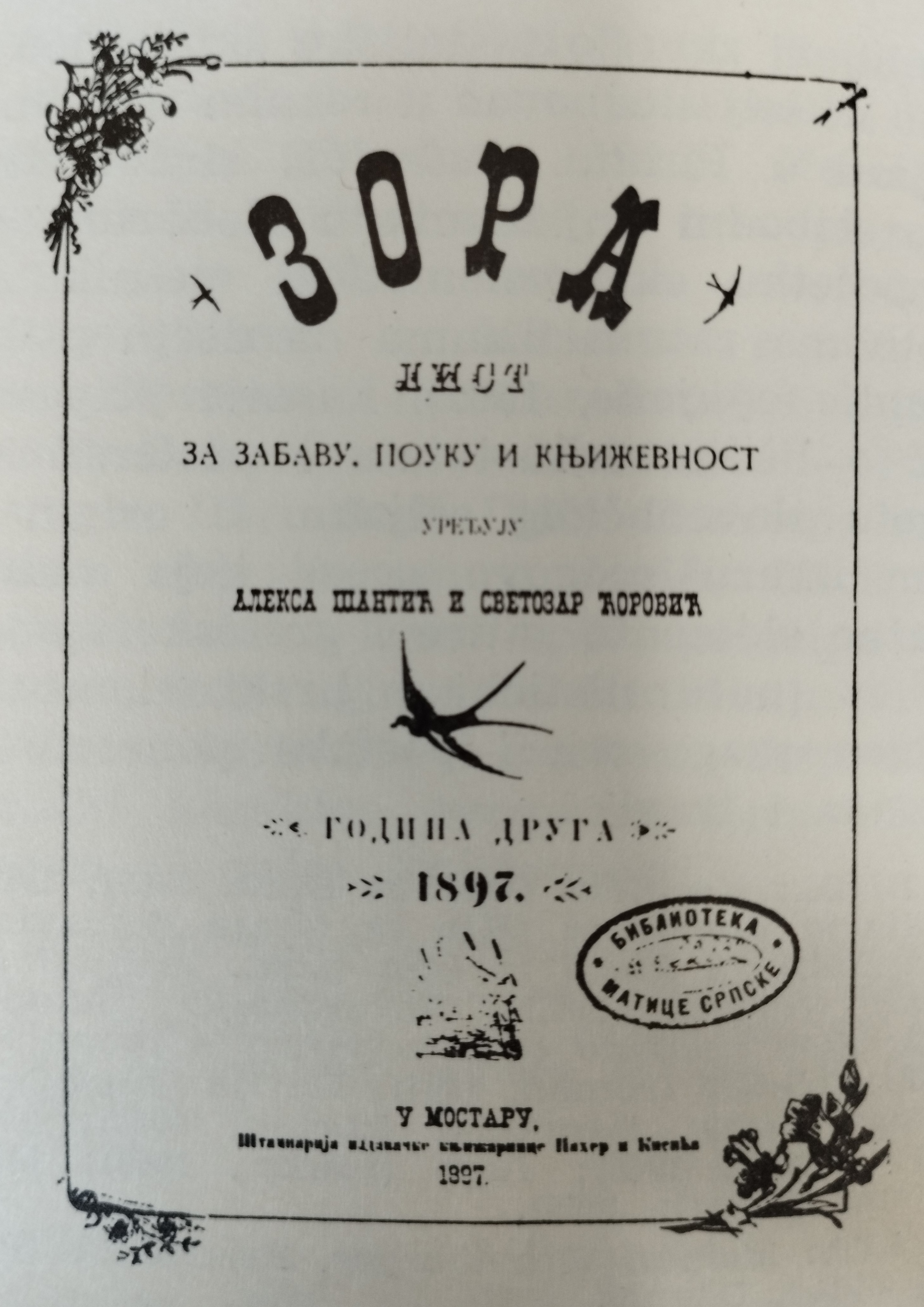
- 1897 cover
- Discipline: Literature
- Language: Serbian
- Edited by: Aleksa Šantić and Svetozar Ćorović

Publication details
- History: 1896–1901
- Frequency: monthly

Standard abbreviations
- ISO 4: Zora

Zora (transl. Dawn, Serbian Cyrillic: Зора) was a literature journal published by Serb intelligentsia between 1896 and 1901 in Mostar, Bosnia and Herzegovina under Austro-Hungarian rule. It was published monthly, in Serbian Cyrillic. Its chief editor was Aleksa Šantić. Besides Šantić, members of its editorial team were Svetozar Ćorović, Jovan Dučić and Atanasije Šola (Šola was one of its editors although his name was not presented in the first several issues of Zora).

== History ==
The request to allow publishing of Zora was submitted on 30 November 1895 to the Government in Sarajevo. Austrian intelligence reported that its editor, Aleksa Šantić, was involved with politics, but "within limits". Benjamin Kallay accepted positive opinion of the Government in Sarajevo, after extensive correspondence between Kotar governor – Government in Sarajevo – County of Mostar, and on 28 February 1896 allowed publishing of the journal. He also wrote detailed instructions to the Mostar County how to surveil and censor future journal to prevent it becoming a political journal instead of a literature one. (Note: (Lešić 1990, p. 127): "Nakon iscrpne prepiske na relaciji: Kotarski predstojnik - Zemaljska vlada - Okružna oblast u Mostaru, zajednički ministar financija Benjamin Kalaj prihvata pozitivno mišljenje Zemaljske vlade u Sarajevu i odobrava izlaženje lista (28. II 1896), naravno uz detaljne instrukcije Okružnoj oblasti o načinu prismotre i cenzure, kako bi "Zora" uistinu bila književni a ne politički list, sa posebnim upozorenjem u vezi budućih urednika i njihovih osobina:") The first edition was published on 30 April 1896.

The literature magazine Zora was published under patronage of Serbian Singing Society "Gusle". Šantić became the editor-in-chief of this magazine review Zora (Dawn; 1896–1901) published by Serbian Cultural Society in Mostar which was among the most important societies which struggled for preservation of Serb cultural autonomy and national rights. (Note: (Bataković 1996, p. 71): "in 1902, their first important cultural- national society Prosvjeta (Education), of greater significance in preserving the national identity. It was to become, together with another Serbian cultural society called Zora (Dawn) in Mostar, the chief agency in the struggle for the cultural autonomy and national rights.") Zora became one of the best Serbian literature magazines. (Note: (Ćorović 1970, p. 7): "Захваљујући упорности тро- јице младића и њихових помагача (Атанасија Шоле, Јована Протића, Стевана Жакуле, Милана Ћуковића), Зора је постала један од најбољих српских књижев- них листова.") The journal Zora gathered members of the Serbian intelligentsia who strived to improve education of Serbian population necessary to reach economic and political progress. (Note: (Biagini & Motta 2014, p. 236): "...and the Serbian intelligentsia gathered around the journal Zora were striving to improve education among the Serbian population in order to achieve economic and political progress...) Šantić and Ćorović invited people to subscribe to Zora emphasizing that they founded this magazine to 'inform part of Serbs who live here about the spiritual legacy of their greatest sons, with the best representatives of modern Serbian literature'.". (Note: (Lešić 1990, p. 128): "Aleksa i Svetozar uspijevaju konačno ostvariti svoj literarni san, ističući u pozivu za pretplatu da "Zoru" pokreću u namjeri da upoznaju 'ovdašnji dio dragog nam srpskog naroda sa duhovnim tekovinama najvećih njegovih sinova, tj. da ga upoznaju s najboljim predstavnicima suvremene naše srpske knjige'.")

== Legacy ==
To mark the centenary of Šantić's birth, a special edition of Zora was republished in 1968 in Mostar.

== Sources ==
- Bataković, Dušan T. (1 January 1996). The Serbs of Bosnia & Herzegovina: History and Politics. Dialogue. ISBN 978-2-911527-10-4.
- Biagini, Antonello; Motta, Giovanna (19 June 2014). Empires and Nations from the Eighteenth to the Twentieth Century. Vol. 1. Cambridge Scholars Publishing. ISBN 978-1-4438-6193-9.
- Ćorović, Svetozar (1970). Изабране странице. Матица српска.
- Lešić, Josip (1990). Aleksa Šantić: roman o pjesnikovom životu. Sarajevo, Yugoslavia: Veselin Masleša. ISBN 978-86-21-00442-3.
- Mešovita građa: Miscellanea. Istorijski institut. 1982. p. 43. "Часопис је излазио месечно само ћирилицом."
- Mikić, Aleksa (1971). Milinčević, Vaso (ed.). Jugoslovenski književni leksikon [Yugoslav Literary Lexicon] (in Serbo-Croatian). Novi Sad (SAP Vojvodina, SR Serbia): Matica srpska. p. 588.
- Odjek. Kulturno-prosvjetna zajednica Bosne i Hercegovine. 1968. p. 15. "Pošto se Aleksa Šantić, kao čelnik ove grupe, prema izjavi austrijskih Dolicijskih konfidenata, bavio politikom "u graInicama", Zora je bez Osobitih poteškoća dobila Apelovu 1 Kalajevu dozvolu za izlaženje"
- Pregled [Преглед]. 1972. p. 1046. "U Mostaru, na rijeci Neretvi, osnovano je još 1888. godine Srpsko kulturno društvo "Gusle", pod čijim pokroviteljstvom izlazi godine 1896. časopis "Zora" i u kome sarađuju Aleksa Šantić, Svetozar Ćorović i Jovan Dučić"
- Летопис Матице српске (in Serbian). У Српској народној задружној штампарији [Serbian People's Cooperative Printing House]. 1998. p. 494. "Када је 1896. године покренута мостарска Зора, Ата- насије Шола је један од уредника — истина, у почетку се и не потписује."
