= Vojislav Ilić =

Serbian poet (1860–1894)

- Born: 20 April 1860; Belgrade, Principality of Serbia
- Died: 2 February 1894 (aged 33); Belgrade, Kingdom of Serbia
- Resting place: Belgrade New Cemetery
- Occupation: Poet

Vojislav Ilić (Serbian Cyrillic: Војислав Илић; 20 April 1860 – 2 February 1894) was a Serbian poet, known for his finely chiseled verse. His poetry exemplifies a classic example of modern Serbian language and features the standard Decadent motifs of the epoch: cruel nature (e.g. cold wind blowing across empty fields), and the times of Elagabalus.

== Biography ==
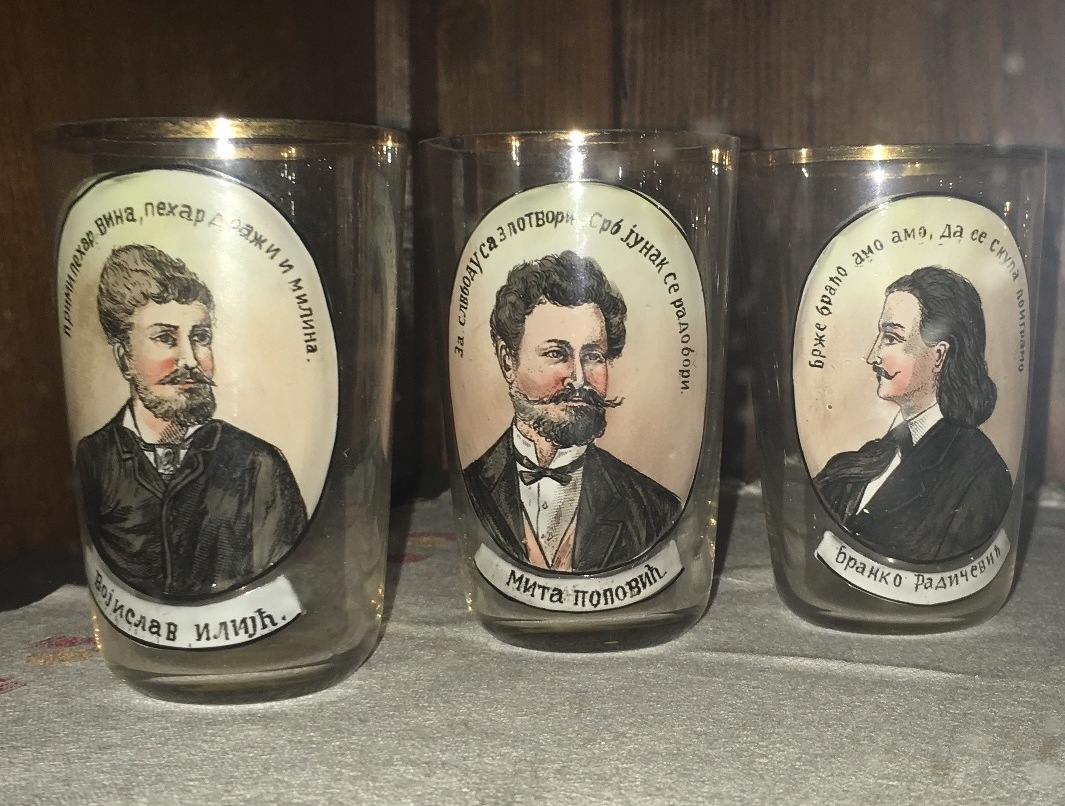
Drinking glass with portrait of Ilić, Despić House

Ilić was born in Belgrade on 20 April 1860, the youngest son of poet and politician Jovan Ilić. On both sides of the family was of the highest provincial middle class, but was not noble; his father was fairly wealthy after retiring from the Privy Council in 1882, and living quietly as the patriarch of a literary dynasty which he helped create. Jovan Ilić, together with politicians-historians Jevrem Grujić and Milovan Janković, played a critical role in the St. Andrew Day National Assembly in 1858 when the call for a parliamentary check on Alexander Karađorđević's monastic power for the first time gained popular support. Vojislav was educated at various grade schools and high schools and at the end of his school days he enrolled in the Faculty of Philosophy at Belgrade's Velika škola, but did not graduate. The hub of literary activity was his home, where he befriended Jovan Jovanović Zmaj and Đura Jakšić and even married one of Jakšić's daughters. In certain aspects Vojislav does belong somewhat to all the four main periods of European literary style that he passed through in a period of less than 15 years, a unique phenomenon, but his great merit as a poet is that he emancipated himself from the affectations and puerilities of his masters. Literary critic Jovan Skerlić said one of the most striking aspects of Vojislav's activity is the attention he drew to the form and technique of poetic creation.

In 1885 he joined the Serbian Army as a volunteer and accompanied his detachment to Bulgaria but did not encounter the enemy. The short-lived Serbo-Bulgarian War gave Ilić another direction than the military. From 1887 until 1892 he was an editor at the Government Printing Press. In 1892 he taught at a Serbian grammar school in Turnu Severin, in Romania. That same year he was appointed press secretary at the Ministry of Internal Affairs, and afterwards vice-consul in Priština, then under Turkish rule.

== Literary work ==
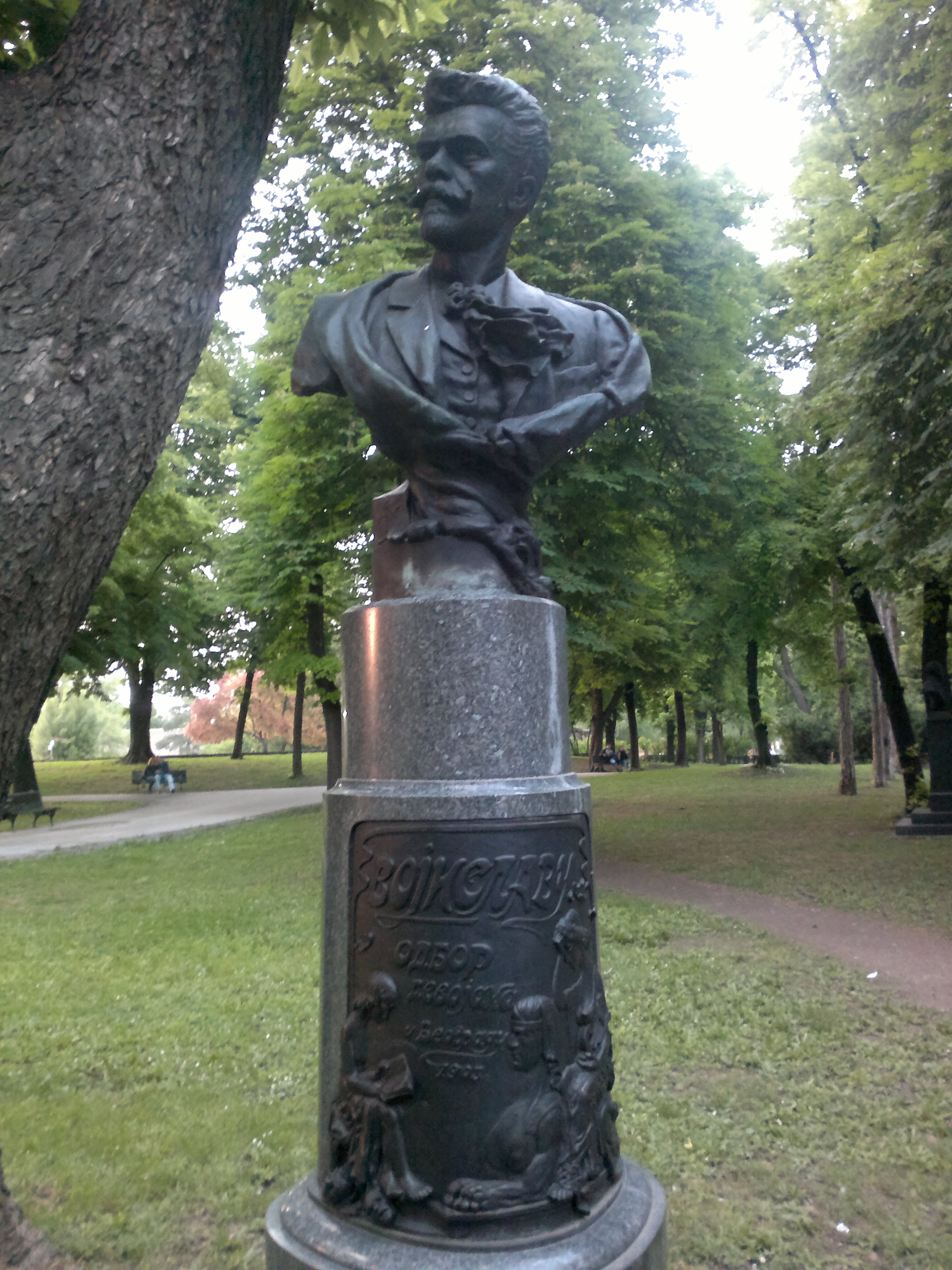
Bust of Vojislav Ilić in Kalemegdan, Belgrade

His first publication was a book simply entitled Pesme (Poems) which appeared in Belgrade in 1887 and this was followed at other intervals by other volumes of more verse. As a poet he soon made a reputation as one of the ablest and most versatile writers of his day. His influence was infectious, young aspiring poets would gather around him and in that period the term Vojislavism became a coined word in Serbian literature. In the 1890s a true Vojislavism reigned among young Serbian poets; no wonder he was proclaimed "the greatest Serbian poet" by Skerlić and other critics. Of the best known Serbian poets who looked up to him during that period were Milorad Mitrović, Mileta Jakšić, Aleksa Šantić, Danica Marković, and for a short while even Jovan Dučić, who soon went on to abandon Vojislavism for a new literary wave that Dučić and Milan Rakić would ultimately espouse, influenced by the French poets. This independence Dučić and Rakić owed in part perhaps to their studies and frequent travels abroad, both were in the diplomatic service. It was Dučić who said, "Even if Vojislav did not succeed in becoming our greatest poet, he is certainly our most beautiful poet."

Critics say he was an ardent follower of Alexander Pushkin: "As far as Vojislav Ilić is concerned Pushkin's influence is beyond question: everything in Ilić's verses, their rhythm and power of expression remind one of Pushkin." Jovan Skerlić reproached him for that, but Ilić himself never made a secret of it and openly avowed in one of his poems that he was a pupil of Vasily Zhukovsky and Pushkin.

Ilić was also an ardent follower of Vuk Karadžić's reforms.

== Death and legacy ==
Ilić died of tuberculosis on 2 February 1894 at the age of 33. He has been credited for having influenced many poets that came after him, thereby paving the way for higher achievements in Serbian poetry in the first two decades of the twentieth century. His work stood the test of time as various editions of his Collected Works have been published after his death, one in 1907 and 1909, in two volumes.

Of Ilić, Jovan Skerlić wrote: "What Lukijan Mušicki meant to Serbian literature in the 1830s, Sima Milutinović Sarajlija in the 1840s, Đura Jakšić and Jovan Jovanović Zmaj in the 1860s, so too, did Vojislav J. Ilić make his imprint in the 1890s. He brought Romanticism to its conclusion and ushered in a new direction – Vojislavism."

He is included in The 100 most prominent Serbs.

== Sources ==
- Translated and adapted from Jovan Skerlić, Istorija nove srpske književnosti / History of New Serbian Literature (Belgrade, 1914, 1921), pages 406–417.
