= Indran Amirthanayagam =

American diplomat (born 1960)

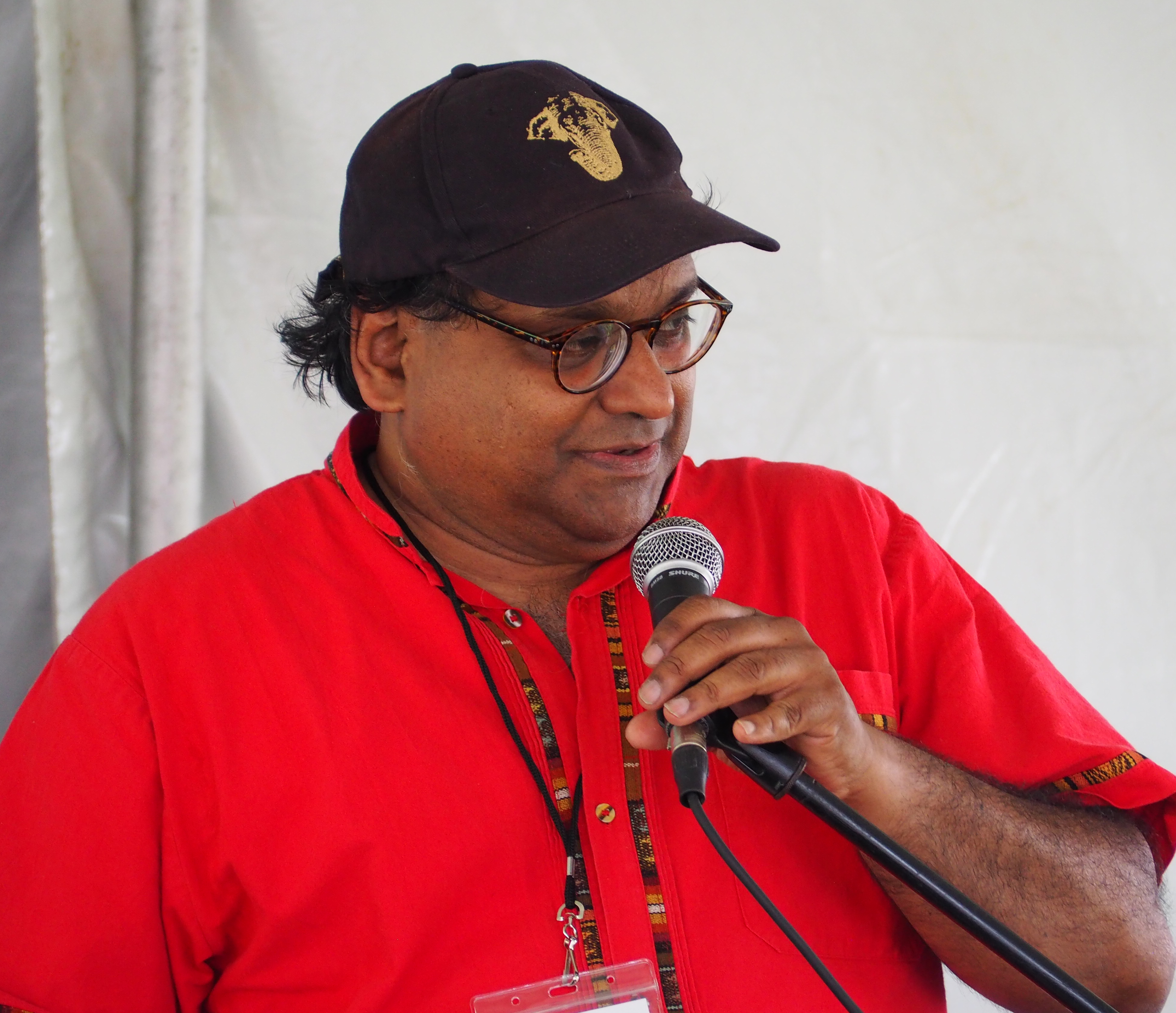
- Born: 1960 (age 65–66); Colombo
- Writing career
- Genre: Poetry
- Notable awards: Paterson Poetry Prize

Indran Amirthanayagam (born 1960) is a Sri Lankan-American poet-diplomat, essayist and translator in English, Spanish, French, Portuguese and Haitian Creole.

== Life ==
Amirthanayagam was born in 1960 in Colombo, Ceylon (now Sri Lanka). When he was eight years old, he moved with his family to London, England, and at age 14, his family moved again to Honolulu, Hawaii, where he began writing.

He then studied English literature at Haverford College, where he also captained their cricket team during his last year. Amirthanayagam has a master's degree in journalism from Columbia University.

He is a diplomat in the U.S. Foreign Service, based currently in Washington, D.C.

== Work ==
He writes poetry and essays in English, Spanish, French, Portuguese and Haitian Creole. His Spanish collections include "Isleno" (R.I.L. Editores, Spain, 2021) El Infierno de los Pajaros (Resistencia, Mexico City), El Hombre que Recoge Nidos (CONARTE/Resistencia, Mexico), "Lirica a tiempo" (Mesa Redonda, Lima, 2020), Sin Adorno, lirica para tiempos neobarrocos (Universidad Autonoma de Nuevo León, Mexico, 2013). Ventana azul, was published by El Tapiz del Unicornio in February 2016 in Mexico City. In 2019, in Lima, "En busca de posada" was published by Editorial Apogeo, and Paolo 9 by Manofalsa.

His three collections in French, Aller-retour au bord de la mer. Il n'est de solitude que l'ile lointaine, and Sur l'ile nostalgique, were published in 2014, 2017 and 2020 by Legs Editions and L'Harmattan.

He has also published The Splintered Face (Hanging Loose Press, 2008),Ceylon R.I.P. (International Centre for Ethnic Studies, Sri Lanka, 2001), and Coconuts On Mars (wwww.paperwall.in). The poem "So Beautiful" was broadcast on the PBS series The United States of Poetry. Univision reported on Amirthanayagam's Spanish poems in a news report in August, 1999. His poems have been anthologized in The United States of Poetry, World English Poetry, Language for a New Century, ALOUD: Voices from the Nuyorican Poets Cafe, The Open Boat: Poems from Asian America, The Nuyorasian Anthology, Black Lightning, Living in America, The Four Way Reader #1.

His poems have also been published in Grand Street, The Kenyon Review, The Massachusetts Review, Exquisite Corpse, Hanging Loose, BOMB, and elsewhere in the U.S.. Poems written originally in French and Spanish have been published in Côte d'Ivoire, Haiti, Mexico, Peru, Nicaragua and Argentina.

His translations of Mexican poet Manuel Ulacia were published in Origami:Selected Poems of Manuel Ulacia (Dialogos Books, 2023) and in Reversible Monuments: Contemporary Mexican Poetry. and Fafnir's Heart (World Poetry in Translation). Translations of Jose Eugenio Sanchez have been published online. Amirthanayagam has translated Kaita-Sofia Hakim, Chema Paz Gago, Natacha Feliz Franco, Natalie Gomez, Sylvie Poisson, Fabricio Estrada, Jorge Ureta Sandoval, Kenia Cano, Francois DeBleu and Beatriz Russo, among other poets from Latin America and Europe. His poetic history of the Sri Lankan Civil War, Uncivil War, was published in 2013. Amirthanayagam read in the international poetry festivals in London (1996), San Salvador (2005), Rosario (2005) Medellin (2010), Lima(2012), Granada, Nicaragua (2009 and 2014,), Santo Domingo (2015), Honduras (2019).

== Bibliography ==
- The Elephants Of Reckoning, Hanging Loose Press, 1993 ISBN 0-914610-72-4 (pbk), ISBN 0-914610-73-2 (hard)
- Ceylon R.I.P., Institute for Ethnic Studies, Colombo, Sri Lanka 2001 ISBN 955-580-060-X
- El infierno de los pájaros, Editorial Resistencia, Mexico City, Mexico, 2001 ISBN 968-5199-17-5
- El Hombre que Recoge Nidos, Resistencia/Conarte, Mexico City, Mexico, 2005ISBN 968-5199-44-2
- The Splintered Face: Tsunami Poems, Hanging Loose Press, 2008 ISBN 978-1-931236-82-9
- Sol Camuflado, Lustra Editores, Lima, 2010
- La pelota del pulpo (The Octopus's Ball), Editorial Apogeo, Lima, 2012 ISBN 978-612-46142-2-4
- Sin adorno—lírica para tiempos neobarrocos, Univ. Autonoma de Nuevo León, Mexico 2012 ISBN 978-607-27-0060-4
- Uncivil War, Tsar—now Mawenzi House, Toronto, 2013 ISBN 978-1-927494-23-3
- Aller-Retour Au Bord de la Mer, Legs Editions, Haïti. 2014 ISBN 978-99970-86-03-7
- Ventana Azul, El Tapiz del Unicornio, México, 2016 ISBN 978-607-96984-1-6
- Pwezi a Kat Men (written with Alex LaGuerre). Edition Delince, ISBN 978-1-944556-51-8
- Il n'est de solitude que l'île lointaine, Legs Editions, Haiti, 2017 ISBN 978-99970-86-31-0
- Coconuts On Mars, Poetrywala, Paperwall Publishers, Mumbai, India, 2019 ISBN 978-93-82749-90-5
- En busca de posada, Editorial Apogeo, Lima, Peru, 2019 ISBN 978-612-4444-03-6
- Paolo 9, Manofalsa, Lima, Peru, 2019 ISBN 978-612-00-4510-7
- Lírica, a tiempo, Editorial Mesa Redonda, Lima, 2020 ISBN 978-612-48298-1-9
- The Migrant States, Hanging Loose Press, 2020 ISBN 978-1-934909-63-8
- Sur l'île nostalgique, L'Harmattan, Paris, 2020 ISBN 978-2-343-20459-8
- Blue Window, translated by Jennifer Rathbun, Diálogos Books, 2021 ISBN 978-1-944884-92-5
- Ten Thousand Steps Against the Tyrant, Broadstone Books, 2022 ISBN 978-1-937968-98-4
- Origami: Selected Poems of Manuel Ulacia, Diálogos Books, 2023 ISBN 978-1-956921-10-6
- Rankont Dout, CD with Donaldzie Theodore, Pawol Tanbou, Titi Congo. Port-au-Prince. October 2017
- They Died Not in Vain, music video, with Evans Okan, Cuernavaca, November 2019
- Various authors (2023). Jarquín, Carlos Javier (ed.). Canto planetario: hermandad en la Tierra. Costa Rica: HC Editores. ISBN 979-8850092115.

== Awards ==
Amirthanayagam's The Elephants Of Reckoning won the 1994 Paterson Poetry Prize. The poem "Juarez" won the Juegos Florales of Guaymas, Sonora in 2006. Amirthanayagam has received the Superior Honor Award and the Meritorious Honor Award (thrice) from the Department of State for his diplomatic work. Amirthanayagam is a 2020 Poetry Fellow from the Foundation for the Contemporary Arts. He has also received fellowships from the New York Foundation for the Arts, the US/Mexico Fund for Culture and the Macdowell Colony. In 2022 Amirthanayagam received the 2022 IFLAC World Poet/Poeta Mundial award.
