= Hercegovačka Gračanica =

Serbian Orthodox monastery in Trebinje, Bosnia and Herzegovina

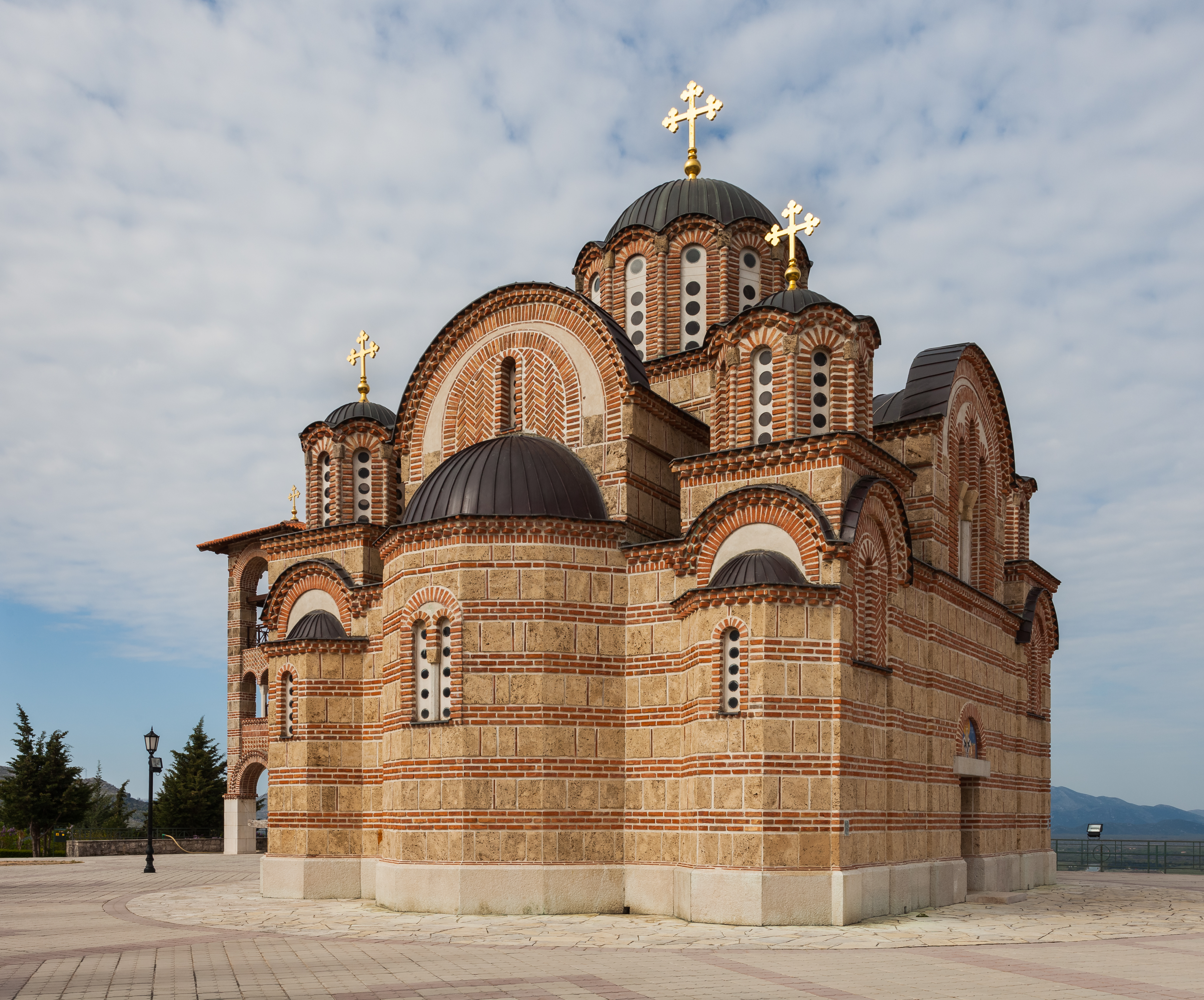
- Hercegovačka Gračanica monastery, pictured in 2014

- Location within Bosnia and Herzegovina
- Interactive map of Hercegovačka Gračanica

Monastery information
- Order: Serbian Orthodox Church
- Established: 2000
- Dedication: Most Holy Theotokos
- Diocese: Eparchy of Zachlumia, Herzegovina, and the Littoral

People
- Important associated figures: Predrag Ristić (architect)

Site
- Location: Trebinje, Republika Srpska, Bosnia and Herzegovina
- Coordinates: 42°42′38″N 18°21′35″E

The Hercegovačka Gračanica Monastery (Serbian: Манастир Херцеговачка Грачаница, romanized: Manastir Hercegovačka Gračanica) is a Serbian Orthodox monastery located in Trebinje, Bosnia and Herzegovina.

== History ==
The monastery is located above the town, on the historic Crkvina Hill. Crkvina Hill has expansive views of Trebinje and has been a place of pilgrimage throughout the ages.

At the current site of Hercegovacka Gračanica there was once the Church of Saint Michael, the medieval endowment of Serbian King Milutin.

Largely a copy of the Gračanica monastery in Kosovo, Hercegovačka Gračanica was built according to the last wish of the prominent poet and diplomat Jovan Dučić, who wanted to be buried on a hill above Trebinje in a church like "one in Kosovo". Dučić's remains were transferred from United States to Hercegovačka Gračanica in 2000.

== See also ==
- List of Serbian Orthodox monasteries
