= Aleksa Šantić =

Herzegovinian Serb poet (1868-1924)

- Алекса Шантић
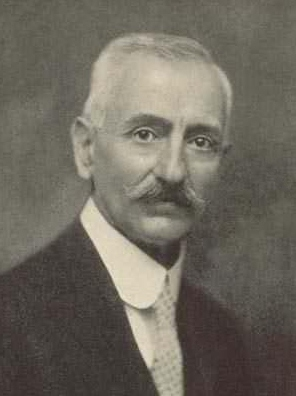
- Aleksa Šantić, c. 1920
- Born: 27 May 1868; Mostar, Bosnia Vilayet, Ottoman Empire
- Died: 2 February 1924 (aged 55); Mostar, Kingdom of Serbs, Croats and Slovenes
- Resting place: Mostar Old Cemetery
- Occupation: Poet
- Writing career
- Notable work: "Emina"

Aleksa Šantić (Serbian Cyrillic: Алекса Шантић, pronounced [ǎleksa ʃǎ:ntitɕ]; 27 May 1868 – 2 February 1924) was a Herzegovinian Serb poet and writer from Mostar, Bosnia and Herzegovina. Šantić wrote about the urban culture of his hometown Mostar and Herzegovina, the growing national awareness of Bosnian Serbs, social injustice, nostalgic love, and the unity of the South Slavs. He was the editor-in-chief of the magazine Zora (1896–1901). Šantić was one of the leading persons of Serbian literary and national movement in Mostar. In 1914 Šantić became a member of the Serbian Royal Academy.

== Early life ==
Aleksa Šantić was born 1868 into a Herzegovinian Serb family, in Mostar, at the time, under the Ottoman Empire. His father, Risto, was a merchant; his mother, Mara, came from Mostar's well-off Aničić family. Aleksa had two brothers, Jeftan and Jakov, and one sister, Radojka, known as Persa; another sister, Zorica, died in infancy.

Just as Šantić turned 10 years of age, Bosnia Vilayet (including Mostar) was occupied by Austria-Hungary, in accordance with the decision made by the European Great Powers at the Congress of Berlin during the summer of 1878.

When his father Risto died, it was Risto's brother Miho, Aleksa's uncle known as Adža, who got a full custody of Aleksa and his siblings. The family did not have much patience for Aleksa's lyrical talents, so in 1880 and 1881, Šantić attended a Merchant school in Trieste in Italian language. While studying in Trieste, Šantić lived with his other two uncle's, Lazar and Todor Aničić, who were merchants in Trieste. In 1881, Šantić moved to a merchant school in Ljubljana, also known as Marova Akademija, where the lectures were given in German. In 1883, he returned to Mostar with a knowledge of Italian and German languages.

== Serb cultural movement ==
As followers of Vojislav Ilić's romanticism, Svetozar Ćorović, Jovan Dučić and Aleksa Šantić were among leaders of cultural and national movement of Bosnian and Herzegovina Serbs.

Šantić and Ćorović intended to establish a journal for Serb children called Hercegovče (lit. 'Young Herzegovinian'), not only for kids from Herzegovina, but for all Serb children in the country.

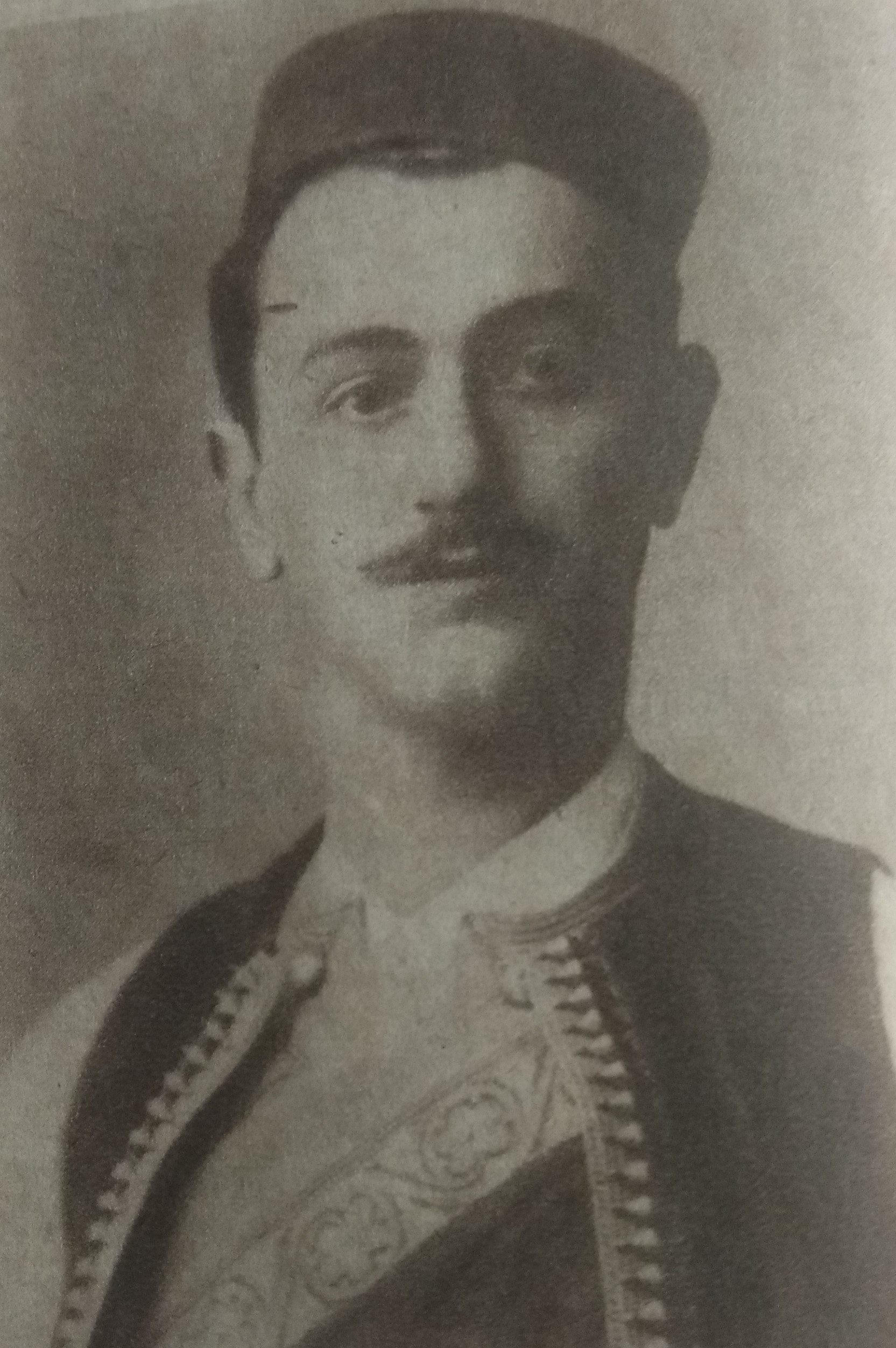
Šantić in Serbian traditional costume from Old Herzegovina

Šantić was one of the notable members of the Bosnian Serb cultural society Prosvjeta. The hymn of the society was authored by Šantić.

Šantić presided over the Serbian Singing Society "Gusle" established in 1888. In this society Šantić was not only its president but also a lead singer of its chorus, composer and lecturer. The literary magazin Zora (lit. 'Dawn'; 1896–1901) was published under patronage of "Gusle". Šantić became the editor-in-chief of the magazine Zora, published by Serbian Cultural Society in Mostar, which was important institution in struggle for the preservation of Serb cultural autonomy and national rights in a multicultural Bosnia and Herzegovina. The Zora became one of the best Serbian literary magazines. The journal Zora gathered members of the Serb intelligentsia who strived to improve education of Bosnian Serb population necessary to reach economic and political progress.

In 1903 Šantić was also among the founders of the Serbian Gymnastics Society "Obilić". In this capacity Aleksa came into focus of regional social life, which, by its cultural and national consciousness, showed an opposition to the German Kulturträger. In the spring of 1909, the Bosnian Crisis caused by the annexation of Bosnia and Herzegovina by Austria-Hungary, forced Aleksa Šantić to escape to Italy together with Nikola Kašiković and Svetozar Ćorović. In 1910, the Šantić family bought a country house in the village Borci, on the plateau below Prenj mountain and above Boračko lake between Konjic and Glavatičevo. They purchased it from Austro-Hungarian baron Benko who built it in 1902. The house was lit to fire during the Bosnian war, but after the war villa is inscribed a National monument of Bosnia and Herzegovina by the KONS.

The product of his patriotic inspiration during the Balkan Wars of 1912–1913 is the book Na starim ognjištima (lit. 'On the Old Hearths'; 1913). Šantić belonged to poets who wrote whole collections of songs glorifying victories of Army of Kingdom of Serbia during the Balkan Wars, including On the coast of Drač (Serbian: На обали Драча) which glorifies liberation of the ancient city that once was part of the Serbian Kingdom under King Milutin. On 3 February 1914, Šantić became a member of the Serbian Royal Academy (precursor of the modern Serbian Academy of Sciences and Arts).

During World War I, he was taken by the Austrians as hostage, but he survived the war. Šantić moved from Mostar to the village Borci near Konjic in 1914, when suspect urban Serb population of Mostar was evacuated from the town. On 13 November 1914, Austrian governor in Sarajevo banned Šantić's collection of poems Pjesme published in 1911.

Šantić was a prolific poet and writer. He wrote around 800 poems, seven theatrical plays and some prose. Many of the writings were of high quality and aimed to criticize the establishment or advocate diverse social and cultural issues. He was strongly influenced by Heinrich Heine, whose works he translated. His friends and peers in the field of culture were Svetozar Ćorović, Jovan Dučić and Milan Rakić. One of his sisters, Radojka (Persa) married Svetozar Ćorović.

== Works ==
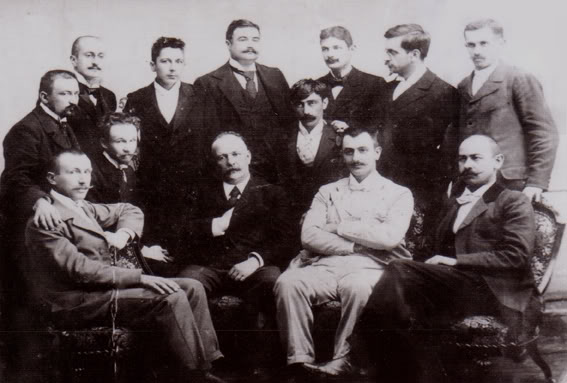
Šantić among prominent writers

Šantić worked as merchant for his father and read a lot of books before he decided to write poetry and met another young merchant, Jovan Dučić from Trebinje who published his first poem in 1886 in the youth literature magazine Pidgeon (Serbian: Голуб) in Sombor (modern-day Serbia). Following example of his friend Jovan Dučić, Šantić also published his first song in literature magazine Pidgeon, its 1887 New Year's Eve edition.

The first poems Šantić published were inspired by older Serbian poets like Njegoš, Zmaj, Vojislav Ilić and Jakšić. The first collection of Šantićs songs was published in Mostar in 1891. He awarded all income from its sales to erecting the monument of Sima Milutinović Sarajlija. In 1901 Bogdan Popović wrote negative critics of Šantić's poetry. Popović's critics had positive and stimulative effect on young Šantić and the quality of his future works.

The oeuvre of Aleksa Šantić, widely accessible yet acutely personal, is a blend of fine-tuned emotional sensibility and clear-eyed historical awareness, steeped in the specifics of local culture. He worked at the crossroads of two centuries and more than other poets of his generation, combined theoretical and poetic suffering nineteenth and twentieth centuries. At the same time, Šantić writes about his personal troubles – the loss of close and dear people (his mother, brothers Jeftan and Jakov, and brother-in-law Svetozar Ćorović), the health that was a lifetime problem and loneliness that accompanied him to the end. Drawing themes and imagery from his hometown Mostar, the atmospheric capital of Mediterranean Herzegovina, and its surroundings, his poetry is marked in equal part by the late-Ottoman urban culture in the region, its social distinctions, subdued passions and melancholy, as well as the South Slavic national awareness.

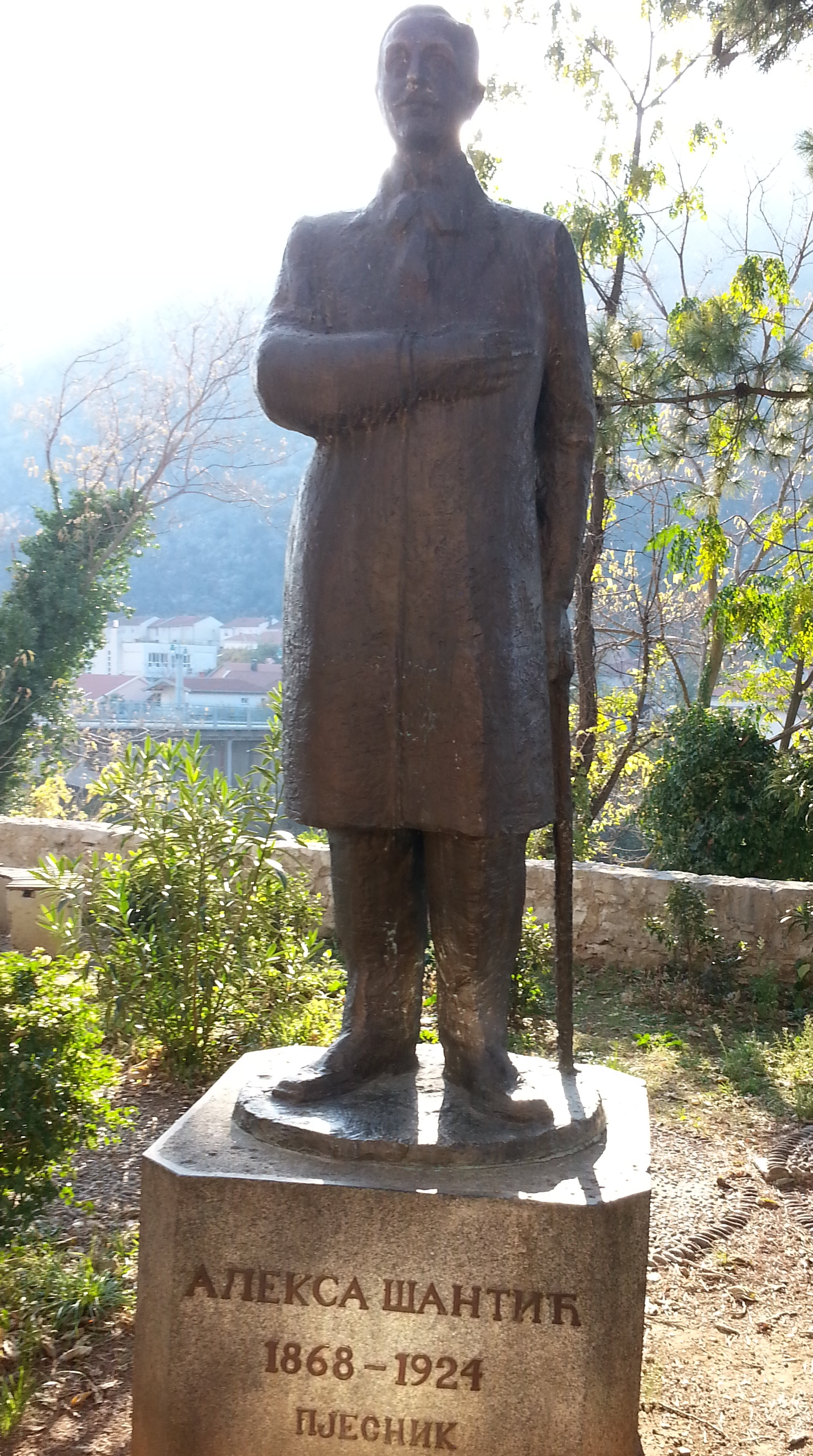
Life size statue of Aleksa Šantić in Mostar

He was influenced mostly by the poets Jovan Jovanović Zmaj, Vojislav Ilić and Heinrich Heine, whom he was translating. He is said to have reached his greatest poetic maturity between 1905 and 1910, when he wrote his best poems. Šantić's poetry is full of emotion, sadness and pain of love and defiance of social and national disempowered people whom he himself belonged. His muse is at the crossroads of love and patriotism, beloved ideal, and suffering people. The topics and images of his poems ranged from strong emotions for social injustices of his time to nostalgic love. His poems about Mostar and the Neretva river are particularly praised. Šantić wrote a number of love songs in the style of the Bosnian love songs, sevdalinkas. His most well known poem-turned-sevdalinka is Emina, to which music was composed and it is often sung at restaurants (kafanas). The ambiance of his love poems include the neighborhood gardens, flowers, baths, fountains, and girls who appear in them are decorated with a necklace, the challenging but the hidden beauty. This is right about the song "Emina". The spirit of this song is so striking that it became the nation's favorite and sings as sevdalinka. In love songs the most common motive is the desire. The poet watches his beloved from afar and longing often turns into sadness because of unrequited love and the failure of life. His patriotic poetry is poetry about his motherland and her citizens ("My homeland"). In some of his most moving poems Šantić sings about the suffering of those who leave the country forever and go into an unknown and alien world ("Stay here", "Bread"). Šantić emphasizes suffering and martyrdom as the most important moments in the historical destiny of the people ("We know destiny").

During his life he wrote six volumes of poetry (1891, 1895, 1900, 1908, 1911, 1913), as well as some dramatizations in verse, the best of which are Pod maglom (In the Fog; 1907) and Hasan-Aginica (1911). He also translated Heine's Lyrisches Intermezzo (1897–1898), prepared an anthology of translated German poets, Iz nemacke lirike (From German Lyrics; 1910), made Bosnian renderings of Schiller's Wilhelm Tell (1922) and translated Pjesme roba (Poems of a Slave; 1919) from the Czech writer Svatopluk Čech. He also translated successfully from German. Šantić was one of the founders of the cultural newspaper "Dawn" as the president of the Serbian Singing Society "Gusle". There he met and socialized with famous poets of that era: Svetozar Ćorović, Jovan Dučić, Osman Đikić, Milan Rakić.

Šantić died on 2 February 1924 in his hometown of tuberculosis. He is interred at the Mostar Old Cemetery.

== Legacy ==
His portrait is on avers of ten (10) Bosnia and Herzegovina convertible marks banknote. In his hometown Mostar, a life size statue is erected In 1920 Sokol Union in Mostar was named after Šantić. In 1969 the Assembly of the Mostar municipality established the Literature Award "Aleksa Šantić" in honor of centennial of his birth.

A village in Serbia is named after Aleksa Šantić, while a bust of him is erected in Kalemegdan Park in Belgrade, Serbia.

In the 1980s a TV film and series titled Moj brat Aleksa (My Brother Aleksa) was produced in his memory.

== Works ==
- Pjesme, Mostar, 1891
- Pjesme, Mostar, 1895
- Pjesme, Mostar, 1901
- Pod maglom, Belgrade, 1907
- Pjesme, Mostar, 1908
- Pjesme, Belgrade, 1911
- Hasanaginica, 1911
- Na starim ognjištima, Mostar, 1913
- Pesme, Zagreb, 1918?
- Pesme, Belgrade 1924

Translations

- Lirski intermeco, Mostar, a translation of poems by Heinrich Heine, Mostar, 1897
- Iz njemačke lirike, anthology of German poetry, Mostar, 1910
- Pjesme roba, translation of poems by Svatopluk Čech, Sarajevo 1919
- Vilijem Tel, a translation of William Tell by Friedrich Schiller, Belgrade, 1922
- Iz Hajneove lirike, a translation of poems by Heinrich Heine, Mostar, 1923

== Sources ==
- Đurić, Vojislav (1969). Govor poezije: Iz srpske knjiz̆evnosti. Prosveta.

== Bibliography ==
- Bataković, Dušan T. (1 January 1996). The Serbs of Bosnia & Herzegovina: History and Politics. Dialogue. ISBN 978-2-911527-10-4.
- Besarović, Risto (1987). Iz kulturne prošlosti Bosne i Hercegovine: (1878-1918). Veselin Masleša. ISBN 978-86-21-00144-6.
- Biagini, Antonello; Motta, Giovanna (19 June 2014). Empires and Nations from the Eighteenth to the Twentieth Century: Volume 1. Cambridge Scholars Publishing. ISBN 978-1-4438-6193-9.
- Đorđević, Mihailo (Fall 1993). "Mostar: A Serbian Cultural Center in the 1880s and 1890s". Serbian Studies. 7 (2): 72–85.
- Dučić, Jovan (1969). Sabrana djela: Jutra sa Leutara. Reči o čoveku. Staza pored puta. Eseji. Prilozi. Književno vreme. "Svjetlost"; Beograd, "Prosveta".
- Ersoy, Ahmet; Górny, Maciej; Kechriotis, Vangelis (2010). Modernism: The Creation of Nation-States: Discourses of Collective Identity in Central and Southeast Europe 1770–1945: Texts and Commentaries, Volume III/1. Central European University Press. ISBN 978-963-7326-61-5.
- Grubačić, Kosta; Čulić, Branko (1965). Narodna biblioteka Bosne i Hercegovine, 1945-1965. Narodna biblioteka NR Bosne i Hercegovine.
- Holton, Milne; Mihailovich, Vasa D. (1988). Serbian Poetry from the Beginnings to the Present. Yale Center for International and Area Studies. ISBN 9789999034739.
- Lešić, Josip (1990). Aleksa Šantić: roman o pjesnikovom životu. Sarajevo, Yugoslavia: Veselin Masleša. ISBN 978-86-21-00442-3.
- Mihailovich, Vasa D.; Mikasinovich, Branko (2007). An Anthology of Serbian Literature. Slavica Publishers. ISBN 978-0-89357-320-1.
- Palavestra, Predrag (1986). Историја модерне српске књижевности: Златно доба 1892-1918. Српска књижевна задруга. ISBN 9788637900153.
- Samardžić, Radovan (1983). Istorija srpskog naroda: pt. 1. Od Berlinskog kongresa do ujedinjenja 1878-1918. Srpska knjiiževna zadruga.
- Skoko, Savo (1968). Drugi balkanski rat 1913. Vojnoistorijski Institut. "Алекса Шантић и други објавили су читаве збирке стихова у славу српских победа. ..."
- Štampar, Emil (1939). Josip Eugen Tomić. University of Zagreb.
- Stojković, Borivoje S. (1979). Istorija srpskog pozorišta od srednjeg veka do modernog doba: drama i opera. Muzej pozorišne umetnosti SR Srbije.
- Ћоровић, Светозар (1970). Изабране странице. Матица српска.
- Jovan Skerlić, Istorija Nove Srpske Književnosti/History of New Serbian Literature (Belgrade, 1914, 1921), pages 421–422.
