= Jovan Dučić =

Herzegovinian Serb poet-diplomat (1872–1943)

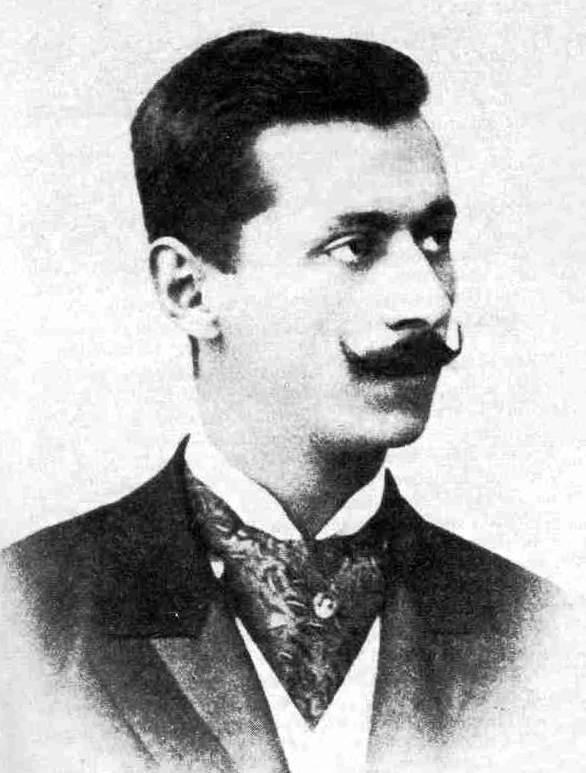
- Portrait of Dučić
- Born: 15 February 1872; Trebinje, Bosnia Vilayet, Ottoman Empire (now Bosnia and Herzegovina)
- Died: 7 April 1943 (aged 72); Gary, Indiana, U.S.
- Resting place: Hercegovačka Gračanica monastery (since 2000)
- Education: University of Geneva
- Occupations: Poet writer diplomat
- Writing career
- Pen name: Krum; J. D. Glogovac

Jovan Dučić (Serbian Cyrillic: Јован Дучић, pronounced [jǒʋan dûtʃitɕ]; 15 February 1872 – 7 April 1943) was a Bosnian Serb poet-diplomat and academic.

He is one of the most influential Serbian lyricists and modernist poets. Dučić published his first collection of poetry in Mostar in 1901 and his second in Belgrade in 1908. He also wrote often in prose, writing a number of literary essays, studies on writers, letters by poets from Switzerland, Greece and Spain and the book Blago cara Radovana for which he is most remembered when it comes to his writing.

He worked in diplomacy for thirty years, serving in nine different cities. Dučić was also one of the founders of the Narodna Odbrana, a nationalist non-governmental organization in the Kingdom of Serbia and he was a member of the Serbian Royal Academy.

== Biography ==
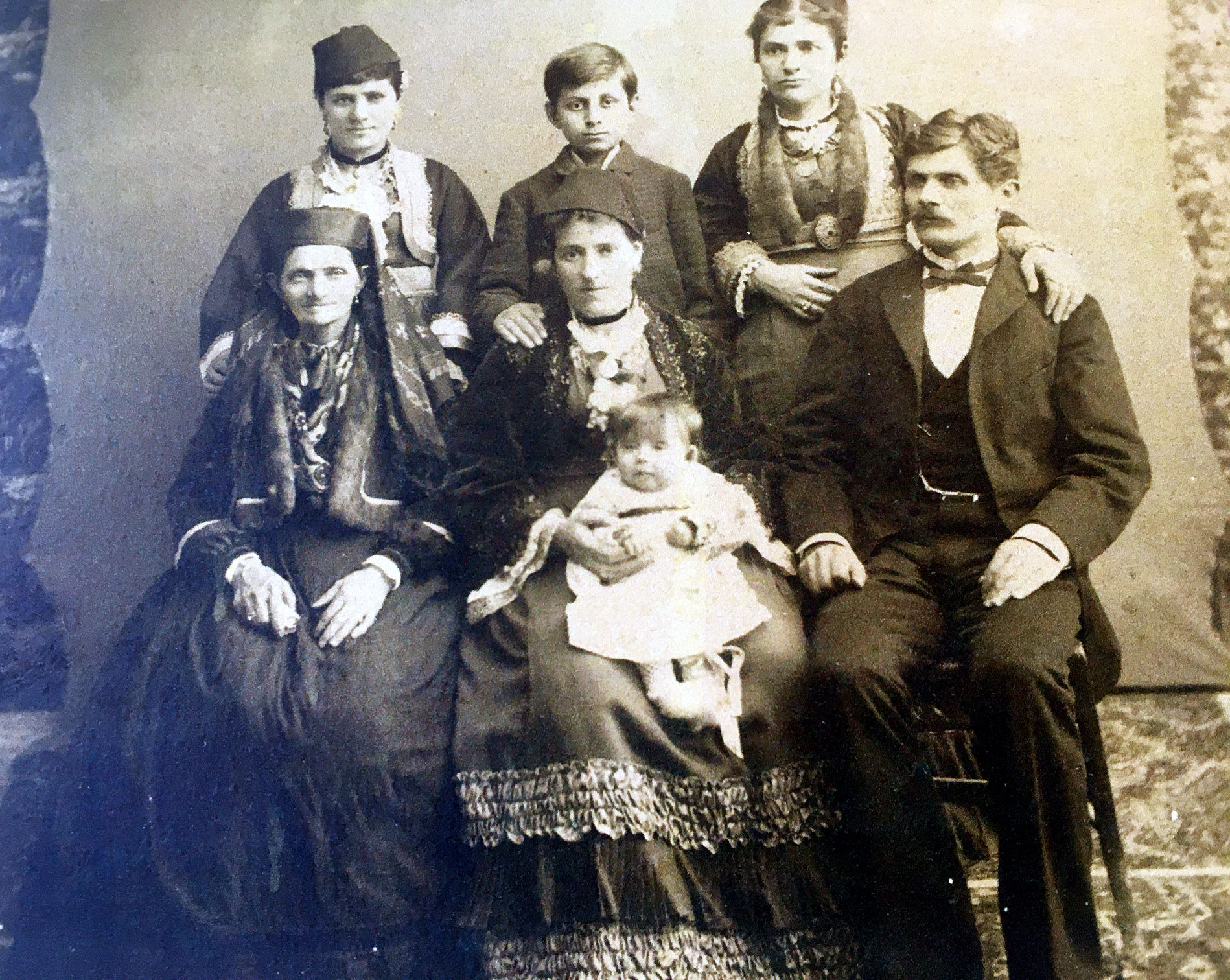
Young Dučić, standing in the middle, with his family

Dučić was born in Trebinje, at the time part of Bosnia Vilayet within the Ottoman Empire. The exact day, month, and year of Jovan Dučić’s birth are not reliably known, and this should not be attributed to anyone’s ill will, but rather to life circumstances and historical conditions. In the literature, 1871 and 1872 are most often cited as the years of Dučić’s birth.

Dučić’s father, Andrija, was a merchant and a patriot. He was wounded during the Herzegovina Uprising and died of pneumonia in 1878. His mother was named Jovanka (Joka), née Sušić. She had previously been married to the respected merchant Šćepan Glogovac, with whom she had two children. Jovan Dučić had a sister, Mileva, who died in March 1890 at the age of twenty-two, leaving behind a small daughter. Dučić suffered deeply after the death of his sister Mila; in 1895, he published the poem “To My Sister at the Grave” in Bosanska vila. Until his third year, Dučić lived in the family home in Podglivlje, and for two war years he lived with his mother and sister as refugees in Dubrovnik. After the pacification, Jovanka returned with the children to their home in Hrupjela, Trebinje.

He graduated from the Teacher Training Academy in Sombor in June 1893, and in the following school year, 1893/94, he became a teacher in Bijeljina. While in Bijeljina, he worked and became engaged to the daughter of a wealthy local merchant. He conceived and largely carried out the celebrations of Saint Sava’s Day at the “Drina” Hotel on 28 January 1894. As a result, the Austro-Hungarian authorities searched his apartment and confiscated two poems which they claimed were Serbian patriotic poems. The Austro-Hungarian occupation authorities banned him from working in all Serbian schools in the territory of Bosnia and Herzegovina. His fiancée married the following year, which caused him great suffering.

After leaving Bijeljina, he lived and worked as a teacher in Žitomislići and Mostar. In Mostar, he co-founded, with writer Svetozar Ćorović and poet Aleksa Šantić, a literary magazine Zora (Dawn). He considered Mostar a confined city in which it was not possible to make sufficient progress, which is why he went abroad to pursue his studies. He was awarded a law degree by the University of Geneva.

Following his return from abroad, entered Serbian diplomatic service in 1907. He had a distinguished diplomatic career in this capacity, serving in Istanbul, Sofia, Rome, Athens, Cairo, Madrid and Lisbon. Although he had previously expressed opposition to the idea of creating a Yugoslavia, he became the new country's first ambassador to Romania (in 1937). In Bucharest, he became an honorary member of the Society of Romanian Writers, and several of his books were published in Romanian. Dučić spoke several foreign languages and wrote travelogues based on some of his diplomatic posts which were published in his work Cities and Chimeras, such as his time in Egypt where he served as the Kingdom of Serbs, Croats and Slovenes's first chargé d'affaires in that country.

For several decades, Dučić studied the life and work of the high-ranking Russian diplomat of Serb origin, count Sava Vladislavich. He perceived him as his double from the past.

He wrote prose as well: several essays and studies about writers, Blago cara Radovana (Tsar Radovan's treasure) and poetry letters from Switzerland, Greece, Spain and other countries. Dučić made a significant contribution to the development of the Serbian essay and contemplative prose, relying primarily on the French tradition.

Dučić went into exile to the United States in 1941 following the German invasion and occupation of Yugoslavia, where he joined his relative Mihajlo (Michael) in Gary, Indiana. From then until his death two years later, he led a Chicago-based organization, the Serbian National Defense Council (founded by Mihailo Pupin in 1914) which represented the Serbian diaspora in the US. During these two years, he wrote many poems, historical books and newspaper articles espousing Serbian nationalist causes and protesting the mass murder of Serbs by the pro-Nazi Ustaše regime of Croatia. In Yugoslav school anthologies published immediately after WWII he had been declared persona non grata and viewed as a Serbian chauvinist.

He died on 7 April 1943. His funeral took place at the Saint Sava Serbian Orthodox Church in Gary, Indiana and he was buried in the Saint Sava Serbian Orthodox Monastery cemetery in Libertyville, Illinois. He expressed a wish in his will to be buried in his home town of Trebinje, a goal which was finally realized when he was reburied there on 22 October 2000 in the newly built Hercegovačka Gračanica monastery.

His Acta Diplomatica (Diplomatic Letters) was published posthumously in the United States (in 1952) and in the former-Yugoslavia (in 1991).

=== Poetry ===
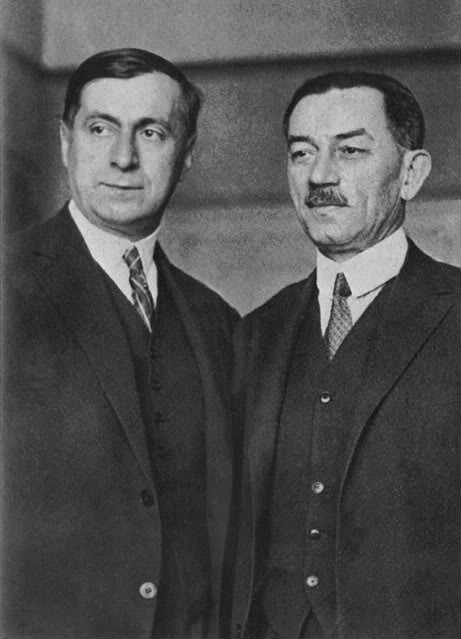
Dučić (left) with fellow Serbian poet-diplomat Milan Rakić

He published his first book of poetry in Mostar in 1901 and his second in Belgrade, 1908.

The six main thematic circles of Dučić’s lyric poetry are: woman (love), God, death, the homeland, nature (that is, Herzegovinian and Adriatic landscapes), and the poem itself (poetry).

Like Šantić, Dučić's work was initially heavily influenced by Vojislav Ilić, the leading Serbian poet of the late 19th century. His travels abroad helped him to develop his own individual style, in which the Symbolist movement was perhaps the greatest single influence. In his poetry he explored quite new territory that was previously unknown in Serbian poetry. He restricted himself to only two verse styles, the symmetrical dodecasyllable (the Alexandrine) and hendecasyllable—both French in origin—in order to focus on the symbolic meaning of his work. He expressed a double fear, of vulgarity of thought, and vulgarity of expression.

As a poet, he does not have a single or coherent poetics. His poetics changed and developed over several decades of creative work. A defining feature of Dučić’s poetics is its dynamism. His poetic work is distinguished and complex; Dučić’s poems introduce new dramatic contents into Serbian poetry and represent the best of an epoch that is brought to a close by his work.

In Dučić’s nature poetry, the metaphorical use of color is particularly evident. He employed many words and expressions taken from everyday speech, which was untypical for poets of his time, and he juxtaposed them with completely different terms that produced unexpected, powerful images.

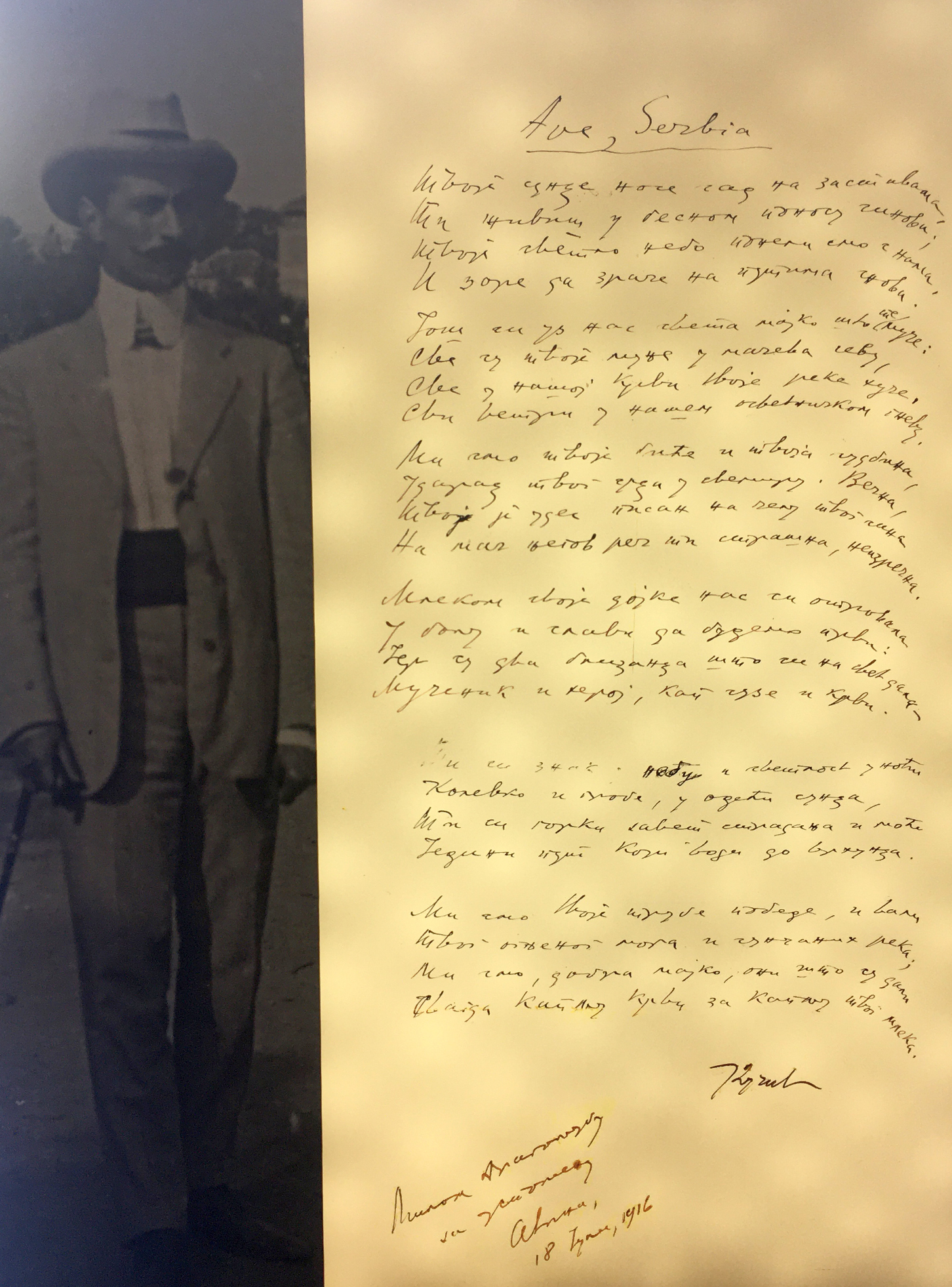
Ave Serbia by Jovan Dučić

His poem “Wings” enjoyed great popularity during the period of the First World War. At that time, he wrote one of his finest patriotic Serb poems, “Ave Serbia”.

He rejected a large part of his youthful poems as unsuccessful. Owing to his strictness toward himself and his willingness to discard everything unworthy of the book and the poet, Dučić continually advanced as a poet, up to his very death.

Shortly before his death, he published Lyrics 1943, which many scholars consider to be his finest book of poetry.

== Personal life ==
Dučić’ participated in the activities of the Serbian Singing Society Gusle, which had a very active theatre section. In Gusle he acted, recited, and delivered speeches. At the first Saint Sava celebration in Mostar in 1887, he achieved his first acting role in Subotić’s drama Cross and Crown, appearing as the Prologue, dressed in traditional folk costume. As a contributor and editor of Zora, he wrote about theatre and acting. He believed that three writers Sophocles, Shakespeare, and Ibsen, represented the entirety of world drama.

His diplomatic career was shaken by love affairs, both real and fabricated. From one affair with a married woman, he allegedly had a son, Jovica. During his service in Geneva, a swindler who lived off blackmail attempted to extort money from him, claiming that Dučić had violated her and thus stained her honor. One of Dučić’s colleagues in diplomacy exploited the situation to fabricate an affair with the intention of harming him. In court, it was proven that Dučić was not guilty, but because of the affair itself he was recalled to Belgrade and later assigned a new post in Cairo, Egypt. In 1927, Dučić fought with the colleague who had set him up, as a result of which his career was suspended for two years. The Ministry of Foreign Affairs of Yugoslavia planned to appoint him as ambassador to the Vatican, but the official Vatican refused the agrément, explaining that it was inappropriate to receive as ambassador a man, even if unjustly accused, of adultery.

The Embassy of Serbia in Hungary is in the house which Jovan Dučić received from a Hungarian woman, and then donated it to the state.

He greatly loved his native city and worked on the promotion and development of its culture. He wrote a testament in 1930. In it, he described how he wished his grave to look and donated his real estate to the museum in Trebinje, while the income from author’s royalties he donated to the municipality of Trebinje for the needs of culture and national work. He proposed the idea and design for the monument “To the Heroes and Martyrs for Freedom” in Trebinje. The monument was erected in August 1938 at a site in the city center where occupying forces had hanged 77 Serbs and two Serbian women during the First World War.

Ivo Vojnović was Dučić’s long-time friend and influenced his literary work. Vojislav Marinković, Kosta Kumanudi, and Ivo Ćipiko were among his close friends, to whom he dedicated individual volumes in the first edition of his Collected Works, published in the 1930s.

== Legacy ==
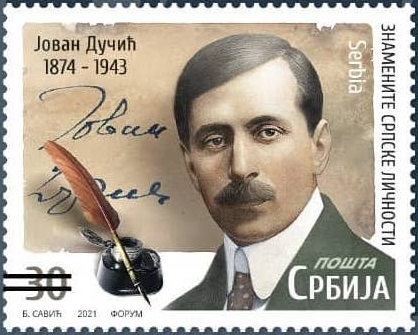
Dučić on a 2021 stamp of Serbia,

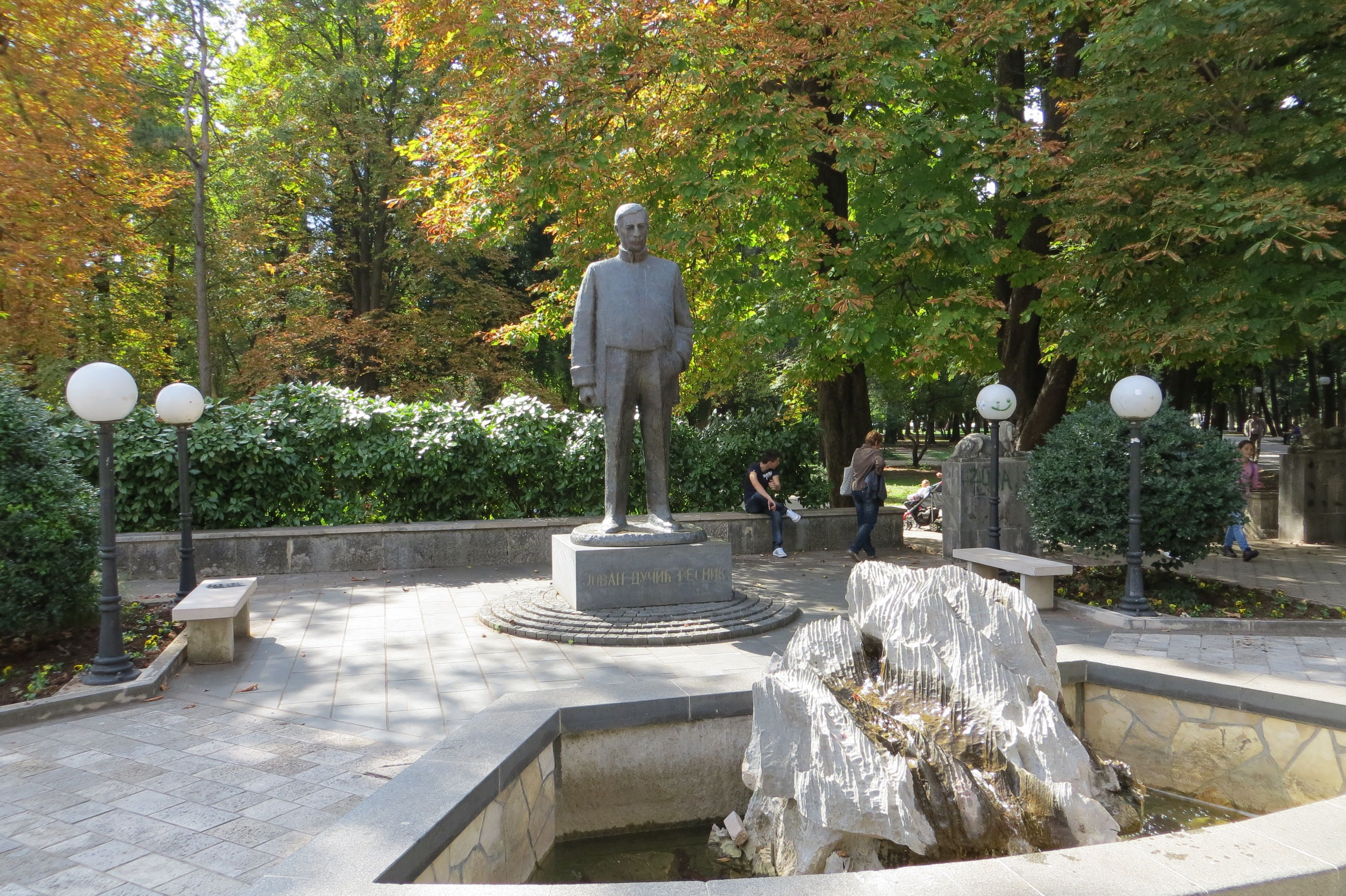
Statue of Dučić in Trebinje

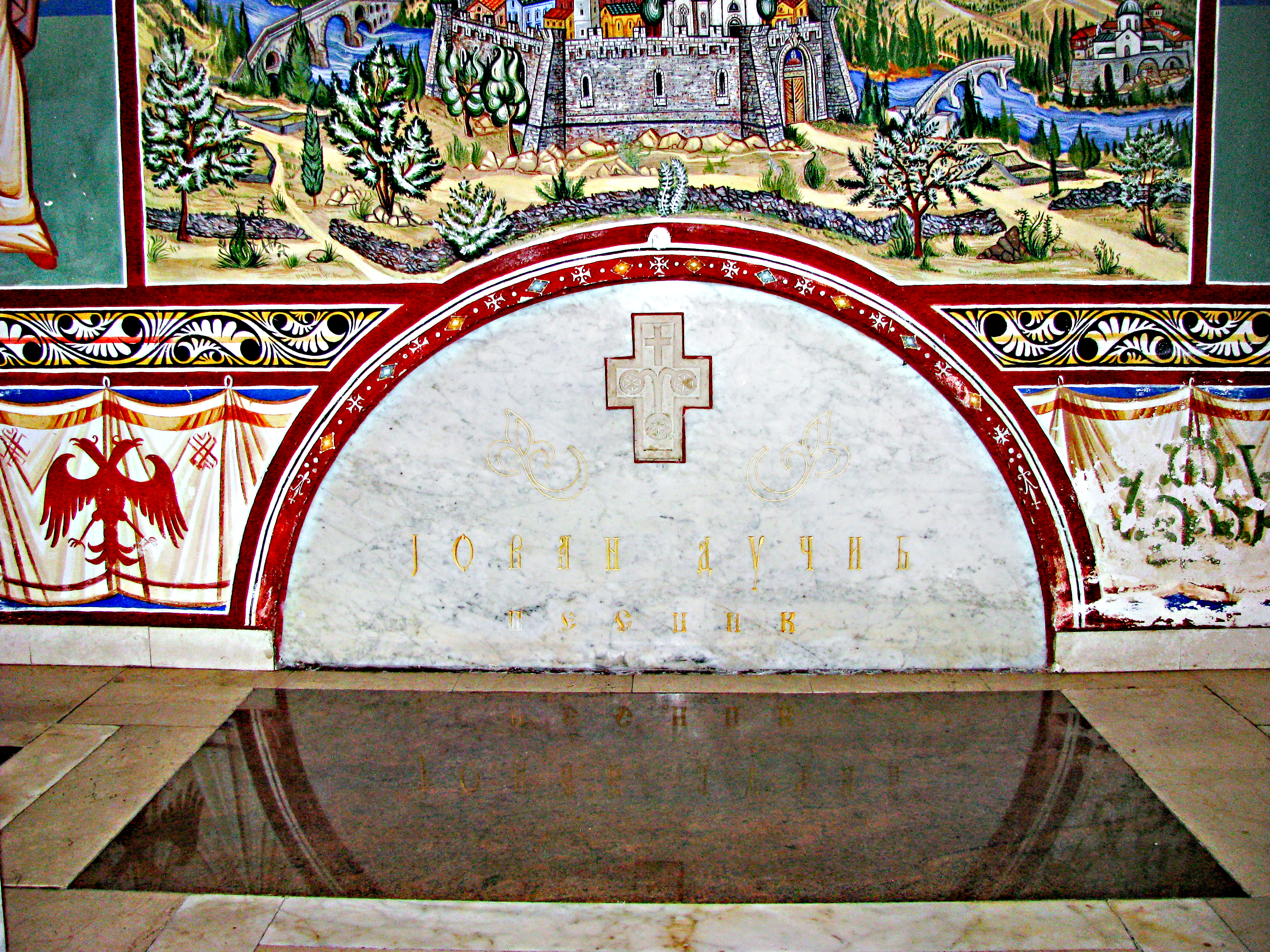
Dučić's grave site in the Hercegovačka Gračanica monastery in Trebinje

Within his poetic opus, Dučić has several poems that may be regarded as masterpieces. He is considered one of the greatest poets of the Serbian language.

Dučić’s Poetry Evenings were founded in 1968, and during the 1970s they were renamed the Trebinje Poetry Evenings.

The Serbian Academy of Sciences and Arts held three conferences dedicated to Dučić’s poetry.

He was elected a member of Parnassos Literary Society. He was honorary member of the Society of English Writers, London and honorary member of the Society of Romanian Writers, Bucharest.

=== Orders and decorations ===
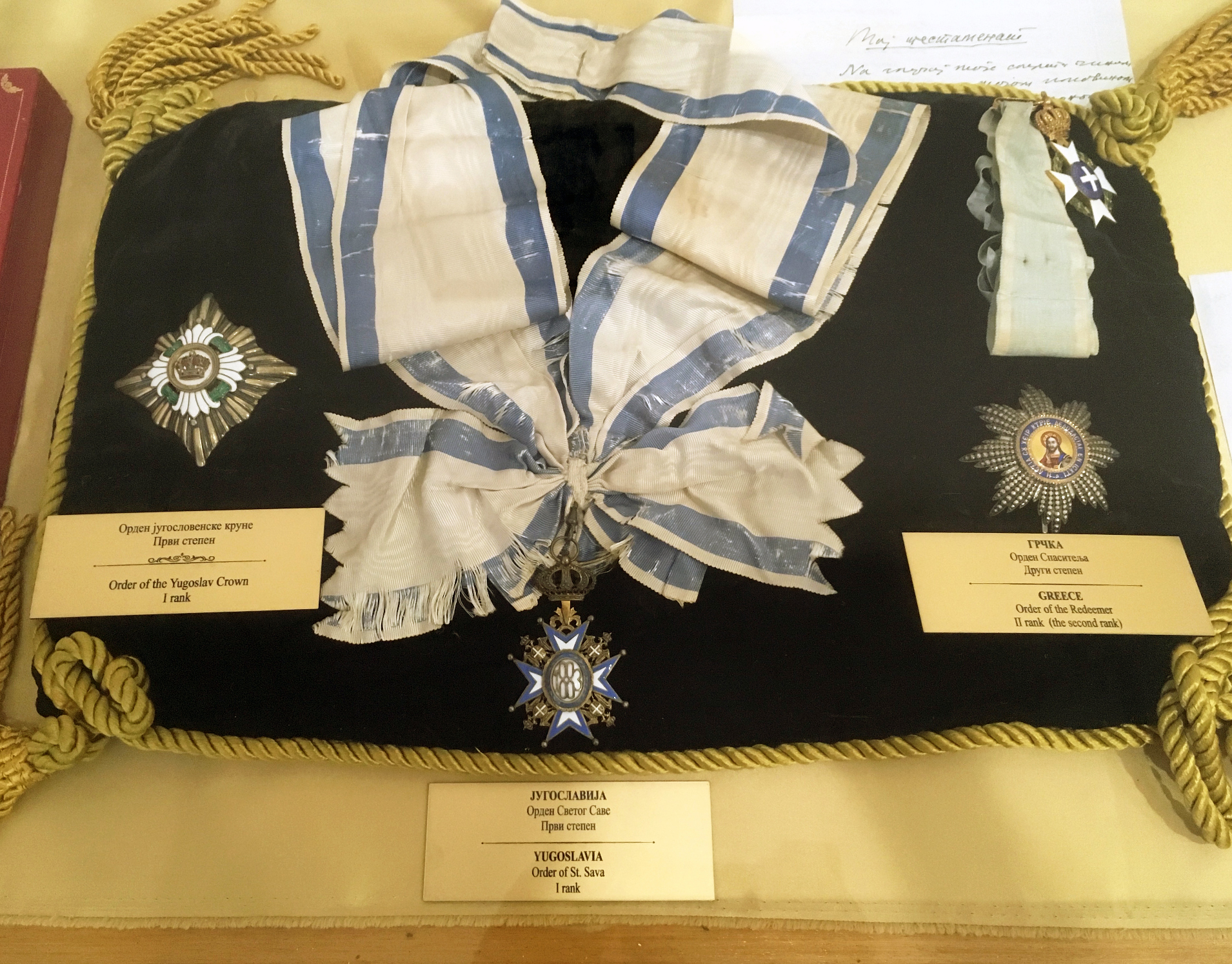
Three orders given to Jovan Dučić for his work, Museum of Herzegovina in Trebinje

State order	Country
Order of the Yugoslav crown, I degree	Kingdom of Yugoslavia
Order of Christ, I degree	Kingdom of Portugal
Order of the Nile, I degree	Kingdom of Egypt
Order of Saint Sava, I degree	Kingdom of Yugoslavia
Order of the Star of Romania	Kingdom of Romania
Order of the Redeemer, II degree	Kingdom of Greece
Order of the Crown of Italy	Kingdom of Italy
Order of the White Lion	Czechoslovakia
Order of Merit	Kingdom of Hungary

== Works ==
- Pjesme, knjiga prva, izdanje uredništva Zore u Mostaru, 1901.
- Pesme, Serbian Literary Guild, Kolo XVII, Book 113. Belgrade, 1908.
- Pesme u prozi, Plave legende, Belgrade, 1908.
- Pesme (štampa "Davidović"), Belgrade, 1908.
- Pesme, izdanje S. B. Cvijanovića, Belgrade, 1911.
- Sabrana dela (I-V), Biblioteka savremenih jugoslovenskih pisaca, Belgrade, Narodna prosveta
  - Vol. I - Pesme sunca (1929)
  - Vol. II - Pesme ljubavi i smrti (1929)
  - Vol. III - Carski soneti (1930)
  - Vol. IV - Plave legende (1930)
  - Vol. V - Gradovi i himere (1930)
- Sabrana dela, Book VI Blago cara Radovana: knjiga o sudbini, Belgrade, izdanje piščevo, 1932.
- Gradovi i himere, (Putnička pisma), Serbian Literary Guild, Kolo XLII, Book 294. Belgrade, 1940.
- Federalizam ili centralizam: Istina o “spornom pitanju“ u bivšoj Jugoslaviji, Centralni odbor Srpske narodne odbrane u Americi, Čikago, 1942.
- Jugoslovenska ideologija: istina o “jugoslavizmu“, Centralni odbor Srpske narodne odbrane u Americi, Čikago, 1942.
- Lirika, izdanje piščevo, Pitsburg, 1943.
- Sabrana dela, Book X Jedan Srbin diplomat na dvoru Petra Velikog i Katarine I – Grof Sava Vladislavić – Raguzinski, Pitsburg, 1943.
- Sabrana dela, Book VII-IX (Odabrane strane), selected by J. Đonović and P. Bubreško. Izdanje Srpske narodne odbrane u Americi, Čikago, 1951.
- Sabrana dela, (edited by Meša Selimović and Živorad Stojković), Svjetlost, Sarajevo, 1969.
- Sabrana dela, (edited by Meša Selimović and Živorad Stojković. Pregledao i dopunio Živorad Stojković), BIGZ, Svjetlost, Prosveta, Belgrade-Sarajevo, 1989.

== Sources ==
- Jovan Skerlić, Istorija nove srpske književnosi (Belgrade, 1921) pages 456–458.
- Delić, Jovan, ed. (2022). Jovan Dučić – pesnik i diplomata povodom sto pedeset godina od rođenja. Beograd: SANU. ISBN 978-86-7025-945-4.
- Delić, Jovan, ed. (2021). Biografija Jovana Dučića. Srpska akademija nauka i umetnosti. ISBN 978-86-7025-915-7.
