= Svetozar Ćorović =

Serbian novelist

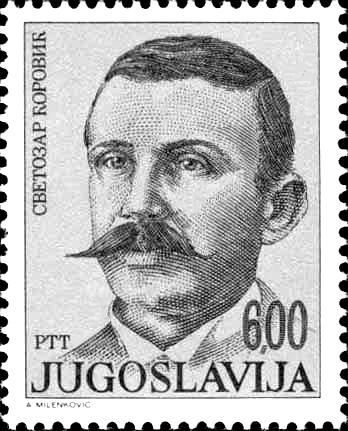
- Born: 29 May 1875; Mostar, Bosnia Vilayet, Ottoman Empire (modern Bosnia and Herzegovina)
- Died: 17 April 1919 (aged 43); Mostar, Kingdom of Serbs, Croats and Slovenes (modern Bosnia and Herzegovina)
- Occupations: Novelist, short story writer
- Relatives: Vladimir Ćorović (Brother)

Svetozar Ćorović (29 May 1875 – 17 April 1919) was a Bosnian Serb writer. In his books, he often wrote of life in Herzegovina and, more specifically, the city of Mostar. His brother was Vladimir Ćorović, a distinguished Serbian historian who was killed in 1941 during World War II in Greece.

== Biography ==
Svetozar Ćorović was born on 29 May 1875 in Mostar, Bosnia and Herzegovina, which was then a part of the Ottoman Empire, in Bosnian Serb family, where he completed elementary school and trade school. From 1887 he published various works in many newspapers and magazines such as Golub (The Pigeon), Neven, Bosanska Vila (Bosnian Fairy), Luča, Otadžbina (Fatherland) and Brankovo Kolo. He was an active member of the Society of Mostar called "Gusle". He also participated in other Serbian literary and cultural activities. He was the editor of Neretljanin calendar (1894, 1895), the initiator and editor of the first three issues of Zora (Dawn) magazine (1896–1901), member of the editorial board and associate of the Narod (People) newspaper (1907). His friends and peers in the field of culture at the time were Jovan Dučić and Aleksa Šantić. One of Šantić's sisters, Radojka (Persa) became Ćorović's wife.

During the annexation crisis of 1908 he fled to Italy from where he offered his services to the government of Kingdom of Serbia, but was subsequently elected as the delegate by the Bosnian Parliament in 1910. Prior to the first Balkan war of 1912, he combined patriotic themes with folkloric elements to produce, Zulumćar (The Despot), his best-known play. Upon the outbreak of war in 1914 Ćorović was arrested and sent to the notorious internment camp of Boldogason in Hungary where he developed the disease that eventually caused his premature death. Seriously ill he returned to Mostar in 1917.

His two remaining years were a constant fight against tuberculosis that ravaged his body. In "Serbia's Great War, 1914–1918" by Andrej Mitrović on page 77, we read how he was mistreated as a prisoner-of-war: "Josip Smodlaka later recalled 'furious Hungarian soldiers wanted to massacre' him and his comrades in Budapest, and the prominent writer Svetozar Ćorović was forced by guards to run without food or water beside the railway transport carrying prisoners".

Svetozar Ćorović died in Mostar on 17 April 1919. He died after sustaining brutal punishment and succumbing to disease transmitted in internment camps, where he spent the first three years of World War I. It cannot be denied that the patriotism exhibited by Ćorović and his brothers-at-arms was unquestionable, for little mercy was shown by the Hungarians to all those who fell into their hands. The severity of reprisal is itself the best testimony to the fear and anxiety inspired by the presence of active Serb soldiers from Bosnia and Herzegovina on the flanks and in rear of the invaders.

Ćorović's collected works were published in 10 volumes.

== Works ==
These circumstances of Ćorović's life, and the affection which he inspired in all those who knew him, added to something essentially romantic in the true sense in the man himself, have tended to surround Ćorović and his work with an aura of sentiment which has somewhat obscured the character of his actual achievement.

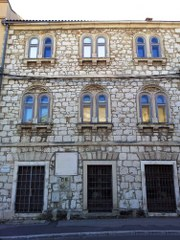
Svetozar Ćorović's House in Mostar

He published a dozen collections of short stories and almost as many novels and several plays. Works that particularly stand out include a novel Majčina Sultanija (1906) with an unusual figure of a provincial woman in the center of the story, Stojan Mutikaša (1907) which tells the story of a man who transforms from the poor peasant boy into a great merchant and villain, and Jarani (Buddies, 1911), which portrays the Muslim population of Herzegovina in times of unrest ahead of the termination of the Turkish authorities.

Selected works

- Ženidba Pere Karantana (Pero Karantan's Marriage, 1905)
- Majčina Sultanija (1906)
- Stojan Mutikaša (1907)
- U ćelijama (In The Cells, 1908)
- U Mraku (In the Dark, 1909)
- Jarani (1911 )
- Zulumćar (1912)
- Kao vihor (Like a Whirlwind, 1918)
- Beleške jednog taoca (Notes of a Hostage, 1919)
