= Amarendra Khatua =

Indian diplomat

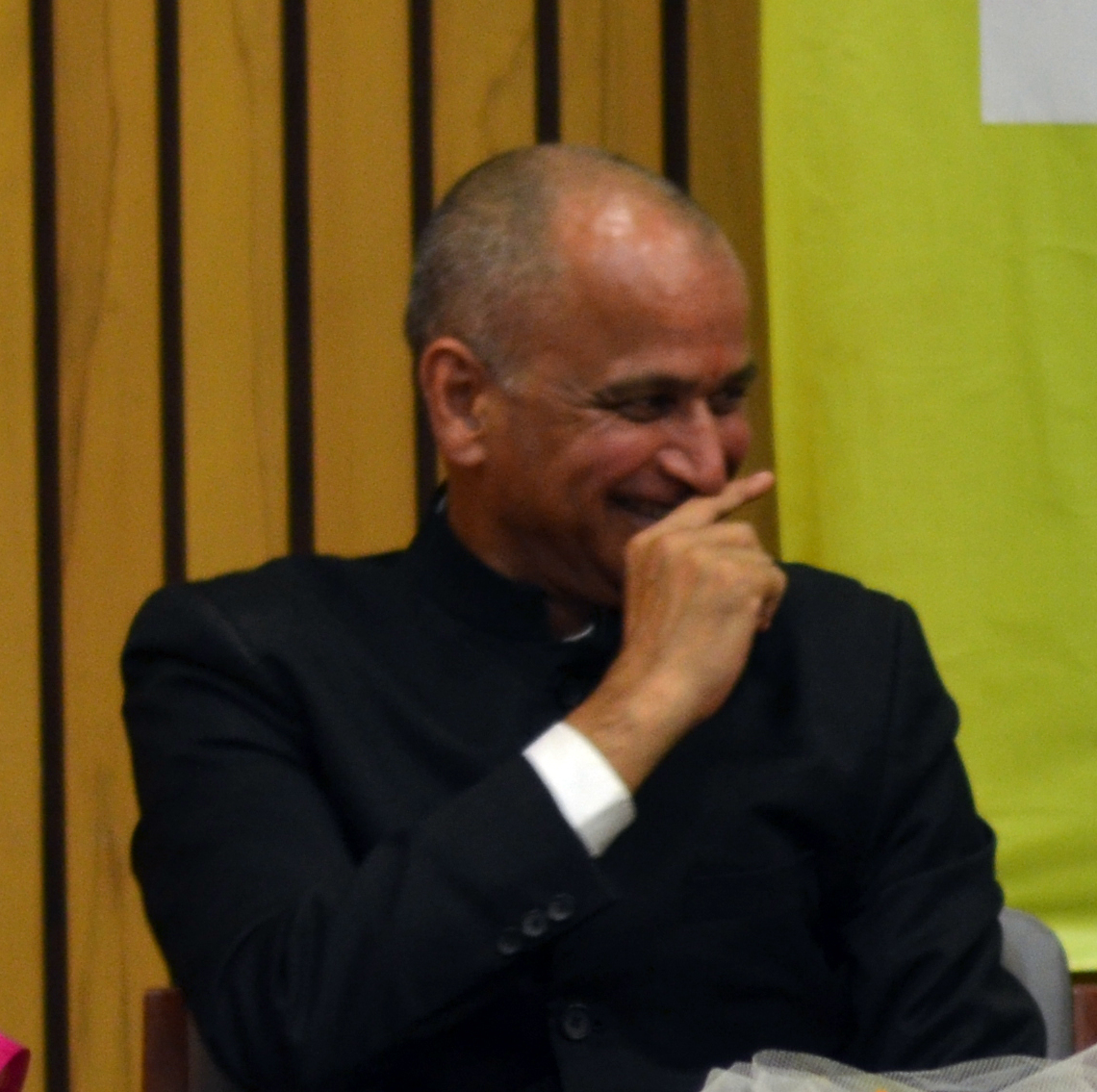
- Amarendra Khatua during Odia poetry at 2nd International Conclave of Odia language 2016 at India International Centre

Director General, Indian Council for Cultural Relations
- In office 16 December 2016 – 31 May 2017

Embassy of India to Argentina
- In office 1 July 2012 – 12 December 2015

Secretary (SA) Ministry of External Affairs
- In office 19 September 2016 – 31 May 2017

Personal details
- Born: 4 June 1957 (age 69)
- Children: 1
- Education: University of Delhi
- Occupation: IFS
- Profession: Civil servant

Amarendra Khatua (born 4 June 1957) is an Indian civil servant who belongs to the Indian Foreign Service cadre. He is the former High Commissioner of India to Argentina, Ivory Coast, Former Secretary (Special Assignment) at Ministry of External Affairs (India) and former Director General of the Indian Council for Cultural Relations, an autonomous organisation of the Government of India.

== Personal life ==
Amarendra Khatua spent his childhood in Birupa Village of Odisha. He obtained a graduate degree from Kirori Mal College University of Delhi in 1978.

== Career ==
He joined the Indian Foreign Service in 1981. He served as special envoy at South Sudan and Sudan to broker peace between two countries. He served as Dean of Sushma Swaraj Institute of Foreign Service and implemented many changes in working. He served as Indian Ambassador to Argentina, Ivory Coast as well. He is also a popular poet in his native language, Odia.
