= Milan Rakić =

Serbian poet-diplomat and academic (1876–1938)

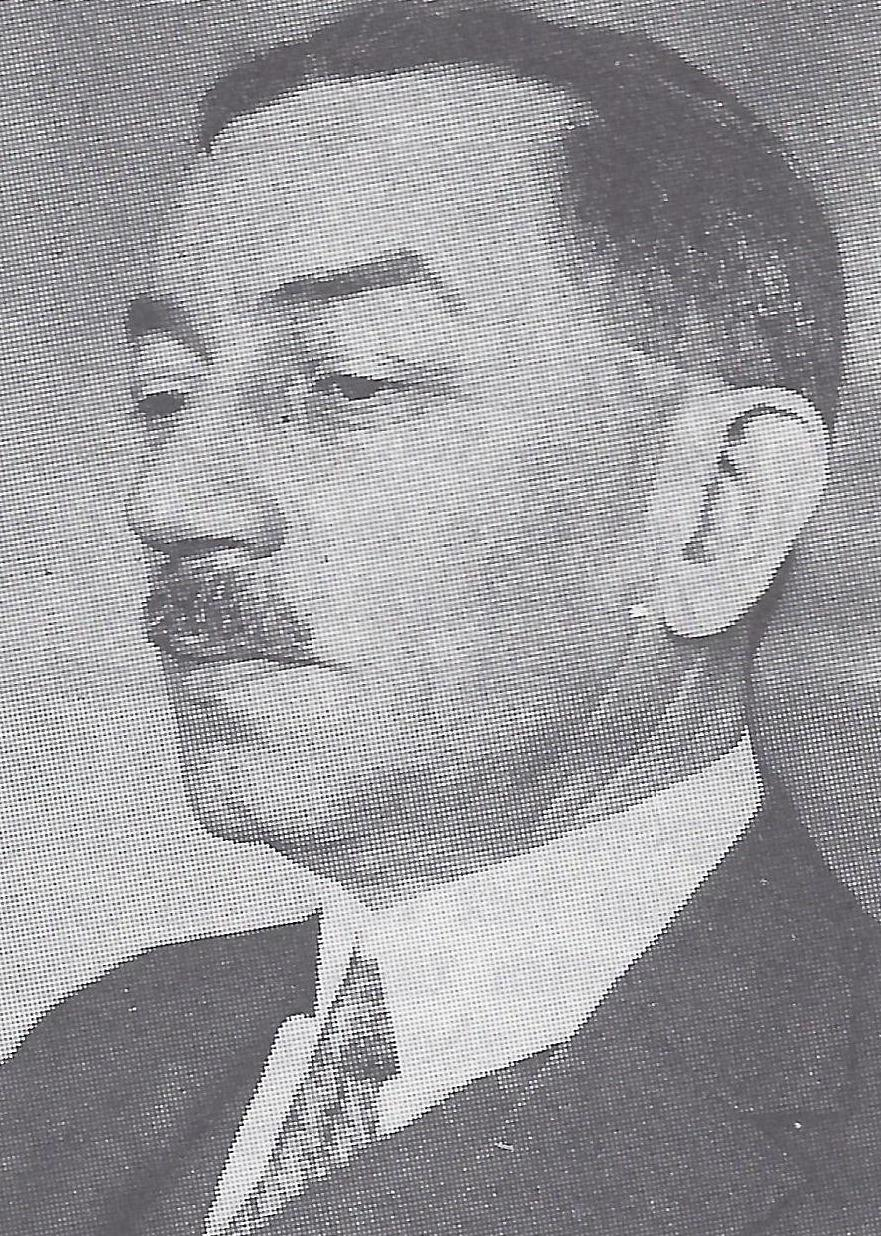
- Portrait of Rakić
- Born: 18 September 1876; Belgrade, Principality of Serbia
- Died: 30 June 1938 (aged 61); Zagreb, Kingdom of Yugoslavia
- Resting place: Belgrade New Cemetery
- Occupations: writer poet diplomat

Milan Rakić (Serbian Cyrillic: Милан Ракић; 18 September 1876 – 30 June 1938) was a Serbian poet-diplomat and academic.

== Biography ==
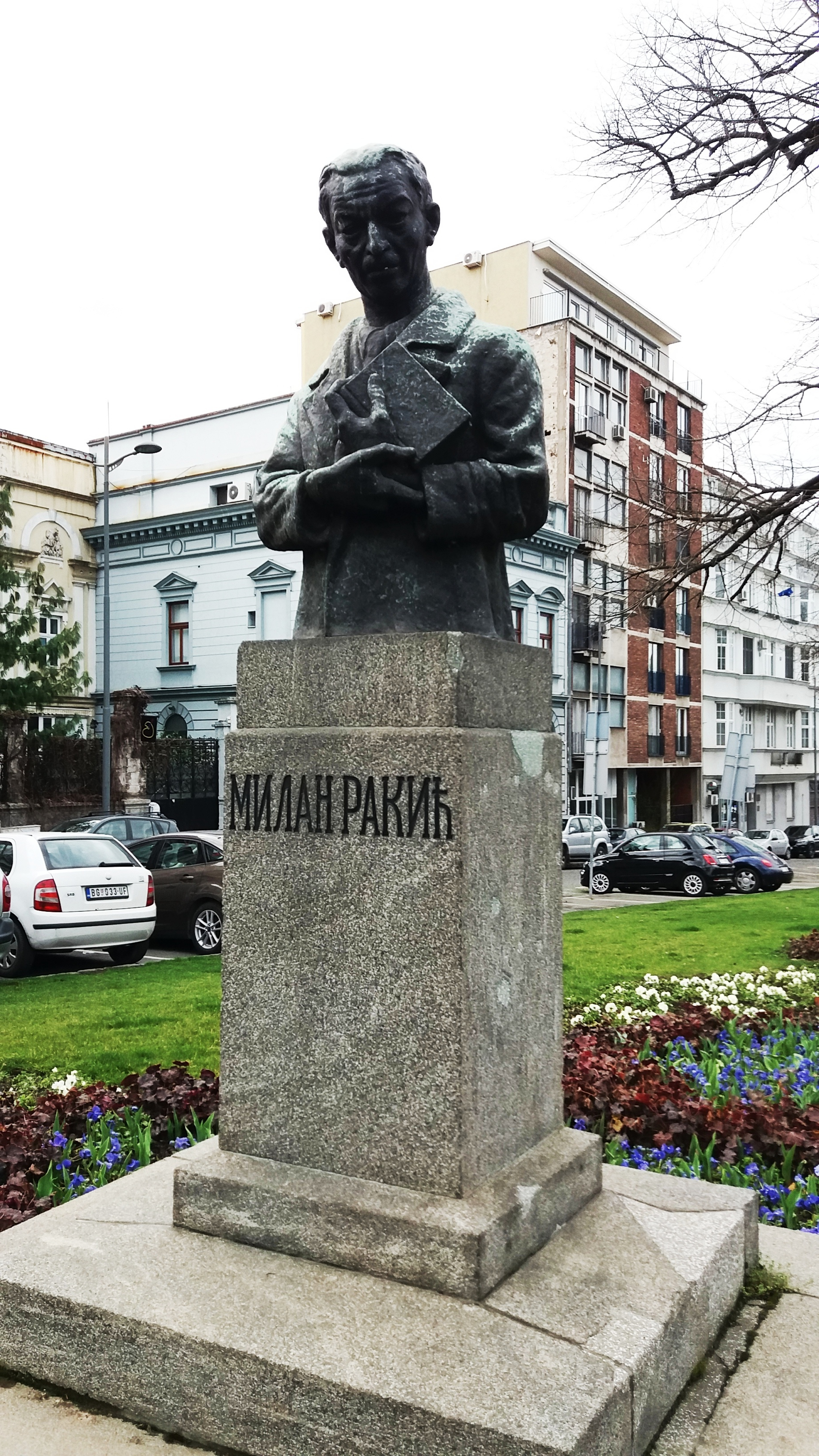
Bust of Milan Rakić in Belgrade

=== Early life ===
Rakić was born on 18 September 1876 in Belgrade to father Mita and mother Ana (née Milićević). His father, educated abroad, was Serbia's Minister of Finance (1888) and his mother was the daughter of Serbian writer Milan Milićević.

He finished elementary school (grade school) and high school (gymnasium) in Belgrade. He completed law school in Paris. It was in Paris that he, like Jovan Dučić, came under the influence of French Symbolist poets. They both had learned to admire French culture and had dreamed of a better world after the war.

After returning to Belgrade from Paris he became a diplomat (also like Dučić) for the Serbian (and later Yugoslav) government and remained in that job until nearly his death, representing the country abroad. His first diplomatic posting was Skopje in Ottoman Macedonia during the turbulent time of the Macedonian Struggle where Serbs, Turks, schismatic Exarchists and their Komitaji, Greek Andart cheta groups, and Albanian Kachaks all vied for supremacy.

=== Poetry ===
He focused on dodecasyllable and hendecasyllable verse, which allowed him to achieve beautiful rhythm and rhyme in his poems. He was quite a perfectionist and therefore only published three collections of poems (1903, 1912, 1924). He wrote largely about death and non-existence, keeping the tone sceptical and ironic. Some of his most well-known poems are An Honest Song (Iskrena pesma), A Desperate Song (Očajna pesma), Jefimija, Simonida and At Gazi-Mestan (Na Gazi-Mestanu). He was a member of the Serbian Royal Academy (1934).

=== Death ===
He died prematurely in 1938 in Zagreb after a surgical operation. He is interred in the Belgrade New Cemetery.

=== Personal life ===
His sister Ljubica was married to Milan Grol; and his wife Milica was the daughter of Ljubomir Kovačević, a distinguished Serbian historian and politician.

== Works ==
Poetry

- Collection of Poems, 1903
- Collection of Poems, 1912
- Collection of Poems, 1924

Other works

- Zasebno štampane knjige Pisma konzula Rakića, Srpski književni glasnik, collection of letters
- Maurice Maeterlinck, Domaće ognjišše, Srpski književni glasnik, HHHGUH, theatre review, knjiga XI. Milan Rakić
- Viktor Hugo, Kralje se zabavlja, Srpski književni glasnik, theatre review, XI. Milan Rakić
- Ivo Vojnović, Dubrovačka trilogija. Srpski književni glasnik, theatre review, XI. Milan Rakić
- Dragutin Ilić, Neznani gost. Srpski književni glasnik, theatre review, XI. Milan Rakić
- Simo Matavulj, Na slavi. Srpski književni glasnik, theatre review, XII. Milan Rakić
- Paul Hervieu, Zagonetka. Srpski književni glasnik, theatre review, XIV. Milan Rakić

== Sources ==
- Jovan Skerlić, Istorija nove srpske književnosti (Belgrade, 1914 and 1921), pp. 458–60.
