= List of Serbian women writers =

This is a list of women writers who were born in Serbia or whose writings are closely associated with that country.

== A ==
- Draginja Adamović (1925–2000), poet
- Mira Alečković (1924–2008), poet
- Princess Anka Obrenović (1821–1868), hers were the first literary works compiled by a woman to be published in Serbia
- Smilja Avramov (1918–2018), nonfiction writer
- Eustahija Arsić (1776–1843), writer

== B ==
- Jelena Balšić (1365/1366–1443), her three epistles are part of the Gorički zbornik (Cyrillic: Горички зборник), a medieval manuscript collection (See: Jelena Lazarević)
- Anabela Basalo (born 1972), novelist, short-story writer
- Isidora Bjelica (born 1967), prose writer, playwright
- Marina Blagojević (1958–2020), writer on gender and feminism
- Milica Bodrožić, political history writer
- Jelica Belović-Bernadzikowska (1870–1946), writer
- Lukrecija Bogašinović Budmani (1710–1784), writer. This writer also holds a place in the Serbian literature of the 18th century.
- Anica Bošković (1714–1804), writer and poet. She's the sister of the famed physicist and scientist Roger Joseph Boscovich.
- Danica Bandić (1871–1950), writer (See also: Danica Bandić Telečki)

== C ==
- Elizabeth Christitch (1861–1933), Irish journalist, writer, poet, translator and Serbian patriot.
- Annie Christitch (1885–1977), Serbian journalist, patriot and women's rights activist.

== D ==
- Jelena Dimitrijević (1862–1945), short story writer, novelist, poet
- Jelena Đurović (born 1973), journalist
- Rajna Dragićević, writer, dictionary collaborator
- Draga Dejanović (1840–1871), poet

== F ==
- Helen Losanitch Frothingham (1885–1972), best known for her Mission for Serbia: Letters from America and Canada, a collection of her letters during the six years she travelled doing war relief work during the First World War.

== H ==
- Ljiljana Habjanović Đurović (born 1953), novelist

== I ==
- Branislava Ilić (born 1970), playwright, screenwriter, prose writer, essayist

== J ==
- Jefimija (1349–1405), poet
- Zorica Jevremović Munitić (1948–2023), playwright, literary historian

== K ==
- Olivera Katarina (born 1940), poet
- Irena Kazazić (born 1972), writer
- Stoja Kašiković, née Zdjelarević (1865 – after 1927), writer
- Mina Karadžić (1828–1894), writer and painter

== L ==
- Jelena Lazarević (1365–1443), writer
- Paulina Lebl-Albala (1891–1967), journalist, translator, literary critic
- Vladana Likar-Smiljanić (born 1943), correspondent
- Tamara Lujak (born 1976), science fiction and fantasy writer, translator, editor, journalist, short story writer, book reviewer
- Svetlana Lukić (born 1958), journalist
- Jelena Lozanić (See: Helen Losanitch Frothingham)
- Andjelija Lazarević (1885–1926), writer

== M ==
- Desanka Maksimović (1898–1993), poet
- Jasmina Mihajlović (born 1960), writer and literary critic
- Princess Milica of Serbia (c. 1335 – 1405), poet, author of "A Mother's Prayer"
- Ognjenka Milićević (1927–2008), translator, essayist
- Mir-Jam (1887–1952), novelist
- Nadežka Mosusova (born 1928), non-fiction writer
- Zorica Mršević (born 1954), non-fiction writer on gender equality, violence, human rights, marginalized groups, and jurisprudence
- Ana Marija Marović (1815–1887), poet and painter
- Mara Đorđević-Malagurski (1894–1971), writer and ethnologist
- Milena Mrazović (1863–1927), Austro-Hungarian writer
- Maga Magazinović (1882–1968), journalist and writer
- Jelisaveta Marković (1868–1953), translator from French, Latin, Norwegian, and English

== N ==
- Anna Novakov (born 1959), art historian, art critic

== O ==
- Vida Ognjenović (born 1941), playwright, writer
- Princess Anka Obrenović (1821–1868), writer

== P ==
- Milena Pavlović-Barili (1909–1945), poet
- Mira Adanja Polak (born 1942), journalist, television presenter
- Maria Palaiologina, Queen of Serbia (c. 1300 – 1355), writer

== R ==
- Eva Ras (born 1941), poet, short story writer, novelist
- Ana Ristović (born 1972), poet and translator

== S ==
- Anica Savić Rebac (1892–1953), translator, essayist, biographer
- Ljiljana Smajlović (born 1956), journalist, newspaper editor
- Milica Stojadinović-Srpkinja (1828–1878), poet
- Maša Stokić (born 1966), dramatist, drama critic
- Gordana Suša (1946–2021), journalist
- Staka Skenderova (1830–1891), Bosnian Serb writer
- Olivia Sudjic (born 1988), British novelist
- Isidora Sekulić (1877–1958), novelist
- Jela Spiridonović-Savić (1891–1974), poet and fiction writer
- Dubravka Sekulić (born 1980), author and architect
- Sofija Skoric (1937–2022), cultural activist and author
- Ružica Sokić (1934–2013), actress and writer
- Svetlana Spajić (born 1971), cultural activist and translator
- Mirjana Stefanović (1939–2021), writer
- Jelena Skerlić Ćorović (1870–1960), writer and translator
- Andjelija Stančić (1865–1955), writer and translator

== T ==
- Ana Tasić (born 1978), theatre critic
- Jasmina Tešanović (born 1954) essayist, short story writer, translator
- Danica Bandić Telečki (1871–1950), writer

== V ==
- Svetlana Velmar-Janković (1933–2014), novelist, essayist, chronicler
- Divna M. Vuksanović (born 1965), non-fiction writer, philosopher
- Nada Vilotijević (born 1953), professor and author
- Sonja Veselinović (born 1981), writer

== Z ==
- Nina Živančević (born 1957), Serbian-born playwright, poet, novelist, critic
- Cvijeta Zuzorić (1552–1648), lyric poet; the Cvijeta Zuzorić Art Pavilion in Belgrade (Serbia) is named after her

== See also ==
- List of women writers
- List of Serbian writers
- Serbian literature
