= Andjelija Stančić =

Serbian writer, teacher and participant in WWI

Anđelija Stančić Spajić (Serbian Cyrillic: Анђелија Станчић was a Serbian writer, teacher, and participant in the First World War. She was born in Šid, Srem County, Vojvodina (then part of the Austrian Empire) in 1865, and died in Belgrade, Serbia, Yugoslavia in 1955.

In 1918 Stančić was awarded the Krst Milosrđa (Order of the Cross of Mercy) which she gladly accepted, but the Order of Saint Sava in 1923, she categorically rejected. Her work came to light after the breakup of Yugoslavia, when her chef d'oeuvre – Najstariji jezik Biblije ili Jedan od najstarijih kulturnih naroda—was reprinted in 1994.

== Biography ==
Born in 1865 in Šid in Srem County, Anđelija Stančić graduated from the Girls' High School and Teacher's College in Sombor in 1884. She was a teacher in Požarevac from 1892 to 1898. After Požarevac, she worked in Šabac, where she taught several subjects: German language, history, geography, and domestic economy. She served as a nurse during the First World War but was forced into exile when the Central Powers invaded and occupied Serbia in late 1915 and early 1916. She spent her exile in Vodena, Greece where she participated in the founding of an organization dedicated to the protection of poor children.

As a young teacher, Stančić dedicated herself to scientific work. In 1912, she authored the "Work Schedule for the First Grade of Primary School", and in 1929 published "The Oldest Language of the Bible: or One of the Oldest Cultural Peoples". Anđelija researched the origin of the Serbian people, proposing connections between elements of the Serbian language and that of the Bible, and drawing attention to similarities between the faith, life, and customs of biblical figures and that of the Serbs. In the ancient Hebrew scriptures, she paid special attention to "dark" words, that is, words whose meaning is known, but whose origin is unknown.

After the outbreak of the First World War, she voluntarily went to the front, where she helped wounded soldiers. After the end of the Great War, King Peter the First Karađorđević awarded her the Order of the Cross of Mercy, which she accepted. But in 1923, she refused to accept the Order of Saint Sava, which was "awarded to the most successful teachers". In a letter published in the press, she explained the reasons for her action, stating that it could have come earlier in her career. Furthermore, she wrote that such recognition should have come instead for the patriotism for which her hometown of Šabac was famous for or for her activities in the Teachers' Association in Požarevac, where she advocated for the betterment of her profession.

Spajić also wrote short stories, children's literature, and poetry. She was fluent in three foreign languages and translated from German, French, and Czech into Serbian.

== Works ==
- Raspored rada u I razredu osnovne škole 1912
- Najstariji jezik Biblije – ili jedan od najstarijih kulturnih naroda 1929
- Najveći svetitelji srpski i slovenski 1934
- Uspešno narodno lečenje 1934
- Molila bih s' 1891
- Slika iz života dece 1893
- Refleksije (U spomenicu Olgi Čečelskoj) 1894
- Kako se rodio Spasitelj 1894
- Večernja molitva 1895
- Požar 1895
- Dobar đak 1895
- Hajd' u školu 1895

She left valuable works on folk medicine, as well as the books "The Greatest Serbian and Slavic Saints" (1934) and "The Traveler: Greek-Serbian" (1936).

== See also ==
- Jelisaveta Marković
- Jelena Dimitrijević
- Danica Bandić Telečki
- Jelena Skerlić Ćorović
