= Jasmina Tešanović =

Serbian-American author and activist (born 1954)

- Јасмина Тешановић
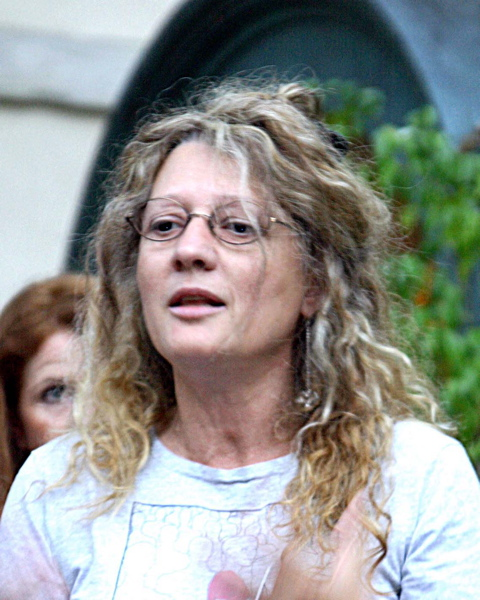
- Born: Jasmina Tešanović; March 7, 1954 (age 72); Belgrade, Yugoslavia
- Citizenship: Yugoslavian · Italian · American
- Education: Port Said School · School of Milan (British School) · University of Milan (BA), (MA)
- Years active: 1975-present
- Organization: Women in Black
- Known for: Diary of a Political Idiot
- Spouse: Bruce Sterling (m. 2005)
- Children: 1

Jasmina Tešanović (Serbian Cyrillic: Јасмина Тешановић; born March 7, 1954) is a Serbian-American author, feminist, political activist (Women in Black, Code Pink), translator, and filmmaker.

== Early life ==
Tešanović was born on March 7, 1954 in Belgrade, Yugoslavia. Her family later moved to Cairo, Egypt with her parents where she attended the primary Port Said School in English. In Cairo she took piano lessons with Croatian pianist Melita Lorkovic. In 1966 her parents transferred to Milan, Italy where she attended the international School of Milan (British School). In 1971 she enrolled at University of Milan and studied Law School for two years which she abandoned to study Art and Cinema. In 1976 she graduated Lettere Moderne at the University of Milan with a thesis on Andrei Tarkovsky with Prof. Adelio Ferrero.

== Early work ==
In 1975 she went to live in Rome after assisting Miklós Jancsó's movie Private Vices, Public Pleasures, shot in Ormož, Slovenia. She lived with actress Laura Betti where she met and befriended director Pier Paolo Pasolini. In 1977, she collaborated with Umberto Silva on the movie Difficile morire.

She did conceptual video performances at the student cultural center of Belgrade SKC ("Love is only a Matter of Words", "An Unedited Being", etc.) and shot short films together with Radoslav Vladić.

== Transition to an author and as an activist ==
She translated Italian authors such as Italo Calvino, Elsa Morante, Alberto Moravia, Sandro Veronesi, Andrea de Carlo, and Aldo Busi, and published an anthology of contemporary Italian literature within Yugoslavia.

After the fall of communism in East Europe, together with Slavica Stojanović, she founded the feminist publishing house "Feminist 94".

Her first book of essays "The Invisible Book" became a manifesto for alternative Serbian feminist/pacifist culture. Since then she published several other fiction and essays books translated in several languages.

She is the author of Diary of a Political Idiot, a war diary written during the NATO bombing of Yugoslavia and widely distributed on the Internet.

In 2004 the Hiroshima Prize for Peace and Culture was awarded to Borka Pavićević, founder of the Centre for Cultural Decontamination in Belgrade, with additional prizes to Biljana Srbljanović and Jasmina Tešanović, Serbian authors and peace activists.

She is the member of the Norwegian PEN center.

Jasmina Tešanović is also an internationally known writer, feminist and political activist. She was one of the key figures on the feminist scene in the former Yugoslavia and Serbia.

Jasmina Tešanović was the co-organizer of the first international feminist conference in the former Yugoslavia in 1978.

She was extremely involved in numerous women's and peace initiatives in the early nineties (Women in Black, Center for Women's Studies) that opposed Slobodan Milošević's policies. She is the author of several books in the field of non-fiction and fiction, as well as films.

== Later work ==
With her husband Bruce Sterling, she started the Casa Jasmina project - the first "open source" house, aimed at exploring the potential of electronically networked objects in the household. She is the curator of electronic art festival "SHARE" in Turin, since 2008

== Personal life ==
She has a daughter.

In 2005, she married American science fiction writer Bruce Sterling.

== Bibliography ==
=== Non-fiction ===
- Mai più senza Torino (with Bruce Sterling) Espress Edizioni, Torino 2012
- The Scorpions: Genocide in Srebrenica, (blog Jasmina Tesanovic, Virtual Vita Nuova, 2012)
- Dizajn Zlocina, Sudjenje skorpionima (VBZ Sarajevo, Zagreb, Beograd 2009)
- Processo agli Scorpioni (Edizioni XII, 2008, Stampa Alternativa, 2009, Italy)
- Matrimonium. Beograd: Feministička 94. 2004. ISBN 9788682449157.
- Me and My Multicultural Street (Feminist Publisher 94, Belgrade, Serbia, 2001)
- Diary of a Political Idiot (Cleis Press, San Francisco, California, 2000) – published in 12 languages
- The Suitcase: Refugee Voices from Bosnia and Croatia (University of California Press, Berkeley, San Francisco, California, 1997)

=== Fiction ===
La Clandestina, Editkit editore, 2023, Italia

Klandestina, Rende, Beograd, Serbia,2022

- La mia vita senza di me, Infinito edizioni, Italy 2014
- Moj život bez mene, Rende, Belgrade, 2013
- Nefertiti (Stampa Alternativa, Italy 2009)
- The Necromancers/Nekromanti (play, 2007)
- Nefertiti Was Here/Nefertiti je bila ovde (Belgrade Women's Studies, Centar za Zenske Studije, Beograd 2007)
- They just do it (play, Feminist Notebooks, Belgrade, Serbia 1998)
- The Mermaids (Publisher 94, Belgrade, Serbia 1997) – Borislav Pekić Award recipient
- A Women's Book (Publisher 94, Belgrade, Serbia 1996)
- In Exile (Publisher 94, Belgrade, Serbia 1994)
- The Invisible Book (KOV, Vrsac, Yugoslavia 1992)

=== Essays and short stories ===
- Mothering in War ("Mothers of Adult children", edited by Marguerite Bouvard, Lexington Books, 2013)
- "All Patients are Refugees" (Stories of Illness and Healing: Women Write their Bodies, edited by Sayantani Das Gupta and Marsha Hurst, The Kent State University Press, 2007)
- "Baghdad/Belgrade Correspondence" (Writing the World: On Globalization, editors Wandee Pryor and Rothenberg, MIT Press, Boston Massachusetts 2005)
- "Letter to My Imaginary American Friend" (Stop the Next War, editors Medea Benjamin and Jodie Evans, Inner Ocean, San Francisco, California 2005)
- "We Are All Women in Black" (Women on War, edited by Daniela Gioseffi, Feminist Press, New York, New York, 2003)
- "Mermaids, Ljubica" (short stories) (Casablanca Serbia, editor Nicole Janigro, Feltrinelli, Milan, Italy 2003)
- The Diary of a Political Idiot (Granta 67, Autumn, London, UK 1999)
- "Lies and Secrets" (Index on Censorship, London, UK 1999)
- Many short essays published on the blog Boing Boing, including "The Long Goodbye", concerning the funeral of Slobodan Milosevic
- "Ja i moja multikulturalna ulica" (Feminist 94, Belgrade, 2001; translated into English as "Me and my multicultural street" in Bojana Kovačević's Master's thesis, Universitat Autònoma de Barcelona, Facultat de Traducció i d'Interpretació, Bellaterra, Barcelona, 2008)
- Other writings for newspapers and TV including Serbian weekly NIN; Serbian daily Nasa Borba; The Washington Post; The Philadelphia Inquirer; L'Espresso; Panorama; ABC TV; El País; Al Jazeera; Flair; Grazia. She has a column in La Stampa, Italy, "I Globalisti" (together with her husband Bruce Sterling) and Yellow Cab, Belgrade, Boing Boing.

== Filmography ==
- Difficile Morire, artistic collaboration on Umberto Silva's film, (Rome 1977)
- Mother and Sinner, with Rade Vladic (Belgrade 1978)
- Morning Midday Evening, with Rade Vladic, film based on a short story by David Albahari (Belgrade 1978)
- Nefertiti Was Here (Belgrade 1978)
- Nefertiti Was Here in Belgrade (Belgrade 2003)
- Jasmina's Diary, with Dinko Tucakovic (Belgrade 1999).The film "Jasmina Diary" based on her diary of a political idiot, produced by SWR TV was distributed in many languages: ARTE TV, Italian TV, German TV, Serbian TV (B92). It was screened in various film festival, Venezia film festival 1999 among others, Leipzig film festival etc.
- Stencil Art in Serbia (Belgrade 2007)
- A Minute to Twelve (Belgrade 2007)
- Invisible Cities (Belgrade 2008)
- Rafts (Belgrade 2008)
- Participation (Belgrade 2008)
- Blogs (Belgrade 2008)
- Recycling Romany (Belgrade 2008)
