= Zlatko Paković =

Serbian theater director and writer

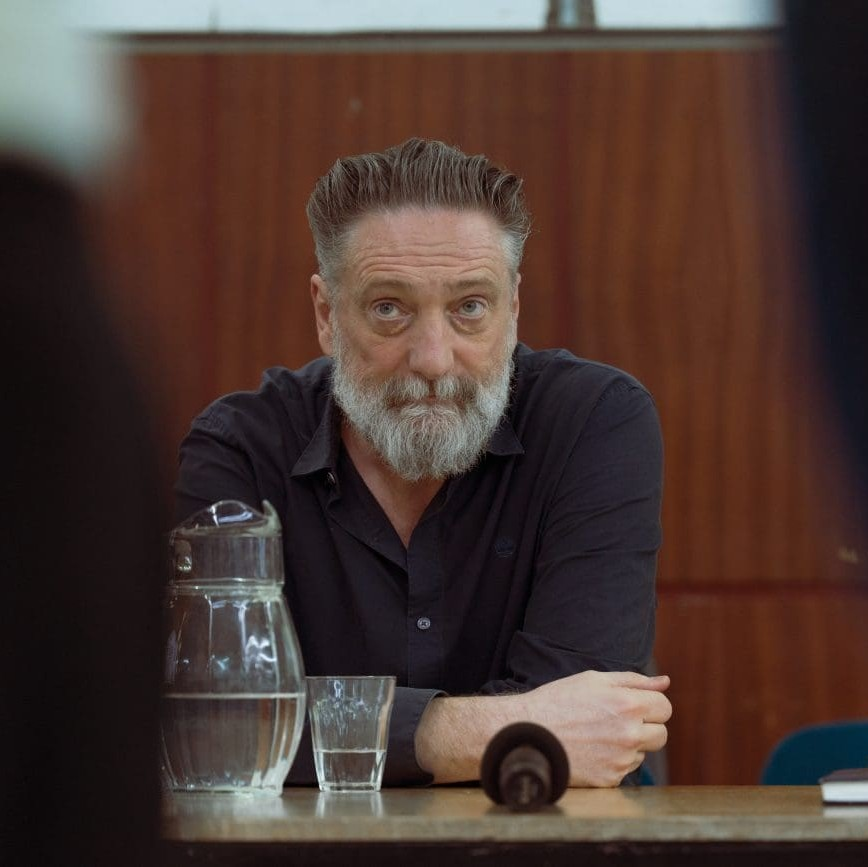
- Born: 1968 (age 57–58); Valjevo, Serbia, Yugoslavia
- Occupations: Theatre director and writer
- Years active: 1996–present

Zlatko Paković (born in 1968) is a Serbian theatre director and writer, best known for his politically engaged theatre and his interpretations of Bertolt Brecht's Lehrstücke (learning plays). His work is characterized by a pronounced sense of playful expression. Throughout his career, Paković has directed theatre productions in various countries, including Serbia, Croatia, Bosnia and Herzegovina, Montenegro, North Macedonia, Cyprus, Bulgaria, Norway, and the Netherlands. His notable productions include Srebrenica, When We the Murdered Rise, To Kill Zoran Đinđić, Pope Francis Wrestles with His Angel, Pier Paolo Pasolini Directs the Last Judgment, Altar Boys, Wittgenstein's Pupils, Capitalism: demonstrated in geometrical order, Othello: the Illegitimate Liturgy, Encyclopedia of the Living, and Katalin Ladik Experiences a Nervous Breakdown, Quits Her Job as a Bank Clerk and Becomes a Conceptual Artist.

Paković has received several awards for his work, including the Sterija Award and the Sterija's "Dejan Penčić Poljanski" Award from the Critics' Round Table for Best Play. For the production If You Stare into the Abyss for Too Long, based on the novel by Enes Halilović, he was awarded two additional Sterija Awards. He has also received the Ahmed Vali Lifetime Achievement Award. In 2014, he was awarded the International Ibsen Scholarship for his project Ibsen's Enemy of the People as Brecht's Learning Play.

== Education and career ==
Paković was born in 1968 in Valjevo, Serbia. He studied at the Faculty of Philosophy and the Faculty of Dramatic Arts in Belgrade, where he earned a degree in theatre and radio directing. Since 1996, he has primarily staged his own plays in various countries, including Serbia, Croatia, Bosnia and Herzegovina, Montenegro, North Macedonia, Kosovo, the Netherlands, Norway, Bulgaria, and Cyprus.

== Theatrical style ==
Paković is an activist theatre-maker. He refers to theatre as "a matter of radical imagination", and sees it as a tool for dissecting and exposing complex structures and ethical dilemmas that shape societies, with the aim of raising awareness and motivating audiences to take action.

Paković describes his productions as provocatio —provocations designed to awaken vocatio, a "call to responsible citizenship". His plays are known to inspire admiration, excitement, and responsibility in audiences, but have also provoked backlash from repressive institutions. A striking example is his production Srebrenica. When We the Murdered Rise in Serbia, which led to nationalist groups publicly threatening him with violence or even liquidation.

Another controversial piece, Pier Paolo Pasolini Directs The Last Judgment, was banned by municipal authorities in Podgorica, Montenegro; its premiere eventually shifted underground to a private basement and was streamed online.

Religion and clerical power recur as central themes in his work. In Croatia, Pope Francis Wrestles with His Angel imagines the Pope dismantling the Vatican Bank, ordaining women as priests, and abolishing clerical celibacy—decisions taken as remedies to endemic church scandals. In Bosnia, Church of Bosnia asserts that truthfulness transcends religious divisions, dramatizing a scenario in which two women are married in a mosque under Sharia law, as an illustration of religious equality.

== Srebrenica, When We the Murdered Rise ==
In 2020 the play Srebrenica. When We the Murdered Rise premiered in the Center for Cultural Decontamination in Belgrade under police protection, following reported death threats by Serbian ultranationalist groups who deny the genocide in Srebrenica. The play was produced by the Helsinki Committee for Human Rights in Serbia. This work marked the first theatrical production in Serbia to place the moral imperative of recognizing the Srebrenica genocide at the centre of its narrative. Researchers Željana Tunić and Snežana Stanković discuss the play in an essay published in Performance Research exploring the mechanisms of denial of the Srebrenica genocide in present day Serbia.

The play was later performed in Brussels on 16 November 2022, followed by a public discussion moderated by Simon Papuashvili, programme director of the International Partnership for Human Rights (IPHR).

== Ibsen's an Enemy of the People as Brecht's Teaching Play ==
In 2014 Paković received the International Ibsen Scholarship for the project Ibsen's An Enemy of the People as Brecht's teaching play. The piece, adapted from Ibsen's The Pillars of Society and An Enemy of the People premiered on 20 December 2015 at the Center for Cultural Decontamination in Belgrade.

Directed by Paković, the production merges Ibsen's moral dramas with Brechtian epic theatre and learning-play techniques. Its stated aim is to "generate critical reflection and action against the hypocrisy of the new, morally unsound political and social classes which have emerged from wars and besmirched transitions", while influencing the values of a younger generation raised amid social fragmentation, corruption, and the erosion of public assets.

Theatre critic Andrew Haydon, in his BITEF 2015 review for The Stage, named the play as "perhaps one of the most direct, confrontational pieces of theatre I have ever seen, deconstructing the Ibsen play via Brecht to end up in present day Serbia confronting its modern day problems."

== Works ==
=== Theater ===
- 1996: The Bald Soprano (Serbian National Theater, Novi Sad, Serbia)
- 1997: Professional (Theatro Praxis, Limassol, Cyprus)
- 1997: Easy piece (Drama Theatre "Sava Ognyanov", Ruse, Bulgaria)
- 1998: Mein Kampf (Little City Theatre "Off the Channel" Sofia, Bulgaria)
- 1999: Second Wednesday (The Drama theatre in Montana, Bulgaria)
- 1999: I can't remember anything (Theater 199, Sofia, Bulgaria)
- 2001: A suit makes a corpse (Cultural Center Valjevo, Serbia)
- 2002: Tonight we are listening (Zvezdara Theater, Belgrade, Serbia)
- 2009: Six Characters in Search of an Author (Duško Radović Theater, Belgrade, Serbia)
- 2009: Prison of the Danube Region (Center for Cultural Decontamination, Belgrade, Serbia)
- 2010: Madame Olga: in search of the Final Version of Civic drama (Center for Cultural Decontamination, Belgrade, Serbia)
- 2012: Anatomy of Nationalist Morality (Službeni glasnik, Belgrade, Serbia)
- 2012: To Kill Zoran Đinđić (Student Cultural Center, Novi Sad, Serbia)
- 2014: What do the women on the right want? (Helsinki Committee for Human Rights in Serbia)
- 2014: Ibsen's An Enemy of the People as Brecht's Teaching-Play (Center for Cultural Decontamination, Belgrade, Serbia, and Ibsen Scholarships, Skien, Norway)
- 2015: Encyclopedia of the Living – an artistic intervention in Serbian and Kosovar reality (Center for Cultural Decontamination, Belgrade, Serbia, and Qendra Multimedia, Prishtina, Kosovo)
- 2016: Philosophy of Parochialism – Christmas Oratorio for Radomir Konstantinović (Center for Cultural Decontamination, Belgrade, Serbia)
- 2016: Othello – the illegitimate liturgy (TeatroVerrdi, Zadar, Croatia)
- 2016: Capitalism: demonstrated in geometrical order (Dezső Kosztolanyi Theatre, Subotica, Serbia)
- 2017: Don Quixote or what the windmills are today and where the wind blows from (Student Cultural Center, Novi Sad, Serbia)
- 2017: Fear Allah! Life and death of Ćamil Sijarić (Bosnian National Theatre Zenica, Bosnia and Herzegovina)
- 2018: Krleža or what are the flags to us or we to the flags and why we cry for them so much (Montažstroj, Zagreb, Croatia)
- 2018: Julius Caesar: res publica or cosa nostra (National Theatre of Bitola, North Macedonia)
- 2019: Vox dei - Civil Disobedience (Cultural Center Stari grad, Belgrade, Serbia)
- 2020: Church of Bosnia (National Theatre Tuzla, Bosnia and Herzegovina)
- 2020: Srebrenica. When We the Murdered Rise (Helsinki Committee for Human Rights, Belgrade, Serbia)
- 2020: If you stare into the abyss for too long (Novi Pazar Cultural Center and Regional Theatre, Serbia)
- 2021: Subotica Secession (Dezső Kosztolanyi Theatre, Subotica)
- 2021: Pope Francis wrestles with his angel (Bacači sjenki, Zagreb, Teatro Verrdi, Zadar, Croatia)
- 2021: Hamlet A.D. MMXXII (National Theatre Tuzla, Bosnia and Herzegovina)
- 2022: Poetics of Resistance by Branko Ćopić (Centre for Culture, Bihać, Bosnia and Herzegovina)
- 2022: Pier Paolo Pasolini directs the Last Judgment (City Secretariat for Culture, Podgorica, Montenegro)
- 2023: A Tomb for Boris Davidovich and How We Build It Today (Bosnian National Theatre Zenica, Bosnia and Herzegovina)
- 2023: What's Erasmus to Us, or We to Erasmus (ICAF, International Community Arts Festival, Rotterdam, The Netherlands)
- 2023: Katalin Ladik has a nervous breakdown, quits her job as a bank employee and becomes a conceptual artist (Dezső Kosztolanyi Theatre, Subotica, Serbia)
- 2024: Wittgenstein's Pupils (Domino, Festival Perforacije, Zagreb, Croatia)
- 2024: Socrat is not afraid of being laughed at (Satirical Theatre Kerempuh, Zagreb, Croatia)
- 2025: To Serbian Youth, Dimitrije Tucović (Puls Teatar, Lazarevac, Serbia)
- 2025: Citizen Matijanić (Hrvatsko Narodno Kazalište Split, Split, Croatia)
- 2025: Altar Boys (Udruga Domino, Zagreb, Croatia)

=== Books ===
- 1995: Singing diary (Hipnos, Belgrade, Serbia)
- 2002: A Room for one Bed (Otkrovenje, Belgrade, Serbia)
- 2008: The Common Ashes (Geopoetika, Belgrade, Serbia)
- 2012: Anatomy of Nationalist Morality and other columns (Službeni glasnik, Beograd, 2012)
- 2013: Die Gemeinsame Asche (Dittrich Verlag, Berlin, Germany)
- 2015: On Authoritarian Conscience (Mostart, Zemun, 2015)
- 2016: Encyclopedia of the Living (Centar za kulturnu dekontaminaciju, Belgrade)
- 2021: Heretical Liturgy - Ten Plays (Zepter Book World, Belgrade, Serbia)
- 2022: Pope Francis wrestles with his angel (Multimedia Institute, Zagreb, Croatia)
- 2024: Dodecalogue - twelve dramatic pieces (Zepter Book World, Belgrade, Serbia)
- 2025: Bloody Poems (Multimedia Institute, Zagreb, Croatia)

=== Essays ===
- 2023: "On Theatre's Responsibility in the Spectacle of Climate Change" (TDR The Drama Review, Band 67, USA)

=== Film and television ===
- 1994 – 2006 VIN – Video Weekly: the first independent television political magazine in Serbia. (Television Director)
- 2006: Look into the Past (Director of the documentary series, ten episodes. (Helsinki Committee for Human Rights in Serbia)
- 2009: Not in Our Name (Screenwriter and Director of the documentary. / Women in Black, Belgrade, Serbia)

== Awards ==
- 1999 Belgrade City Parliament Prize for the best short story, Serbia
- 2010 "Desimir Tošić" Prize for Journalism, Belgrade, Serbia
- 2014 The International Ibsen Scholarship, Skien, Norway
- 2015 Literature Scholarship MuseumsQuartier, Vienna, Austria
- 2016 Literary scholarship from the Lazareti Art Workshop, Dubrovnik, Croatia
- 2021 "Joakim Vujić Award" for best play and best directing, Serbia
- 2021 "Sterija Prize" for the best theatre performance, Novi Sad, Serbia
- 2021 "Special Sterija Prize" for directing, Novi Sad, Srbija
- 2021 "Ahmed Vali" Lifetime Achievement Award, Novi Pazar, Serbia
- 2023 "Amra Prutina", Award for artistic courage, Mostar. Bosnia and Herzegovina
- 2024 Sterija Award „Dejan Penčić Poljanski" from the Round table of critics, Novi Sad, Srbija
- 2025 "Joakim Vujić Award" for best play and best directing, Serbia
