= Jevremović =

Jevremović (Serbian pronunciation: [jeʋrěːmoʋitɕ]) is a Serbian surname. Notable people with the surname include:

- Marko Jevremović (born 1996), Serbian footballer
- Miki Jevremović (1941–2017), Serbian singer
- Zorica Jevremović Munitić (born 1948), Serbian theatre and video director, playwright, choreographer, intermedia theorist, literary historian and feminist
