= Andjelija Lazarević =

Serbian painter and writer

- Born: 3 October 1885; Belgrade, Kingdom of Serbia
- Died: 25 February 1926 (aged 40); Belgrade, Kingdom of Serbs, Croats and Slovenes

Аnđelija L. Lazarević (Serbian: Анђелија Лазаревић; 3 October 1885 – 25 February 1926) was a Serbian painter, poet and writer.

She was born in a respectable family as a child of a Serbian doctor and writer Laza Lazarević. She often dropped out of school due to poor health. From 1908 to 1911, she attended the painting school of Rista Vukanović and his wife Beta Vukanović. She went to study in Munich in 1914, from where she soon returned due to the outbreak of the First World War. She went to Paris in 1920, where her health deteriorated. From Paris, she went to Vienna, and then to Slovenia. She soon moved to Hvar and Split in 1924, where she got a job as a painting teacher in a gymnasium. After two years, she returned to her native Belgrade, where she died early and suddenly at the age of forty in a sanatorium in Vračar.

Her painting and literary opus are small. From 1913, she exhibited her works as a member of Lada at Yugoslav and social exhibitions. She mostly painted landscapes. She wrote several poems and eight short stories, which were published in reputable Serbian literary magazines. Some of the dominant features of modern trends in Serbian prose (turning from the outside to the inside, turning to new themes and a new hero, moving events from the village to the city, etc.) can be recognized in her narrative work.

== Biography ==
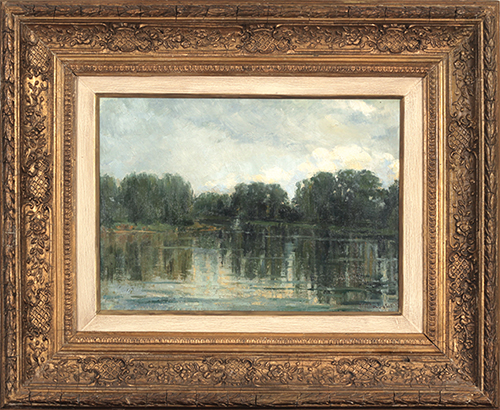
River with a shore, 1920

Andjelija L. Lazarević was born in 1885 in Belgrade, in a respectable family. Her father was the Serbian doctor and writer Laza Lazarević, and her mother was Poleksija, the daughter of Nikola Hristić, a politician, minister and prime minister. When she turned five, she lost her father.

Due to illness, she often had to drop out of school. She finished elementary school by studying at home and taking exams at school. From 1908 to 1911, first as a part-time student, then as a regular student, she attended the painting school run by the Belgrade couple Rista and Beta Vukanović. She knew French and German well, and she also studied English, Italian and Russian. She passed the junior high school graduation exam in 1910, and the following year she was appointed a painting teacher at the First Women's Gymnasium in Belgrade.

In June 1914, she went to the Academy of Fine Arts in Munich to continue her education. However, due to the outbreak of the First World War, she returned to Serbia. She spent the first year of the war with her mother in Prokuplje, where she volunteered as a nurse in a field hospital. She then returned to occupied Belgrade, where she supported herself by holding private painting classes and painting jars with traditional Serbian motifs with rugs.

After the war, more precisely in the fall of 1920, Andjelija Lazarević went to Paris, where she remained for a year. In Paris, her health situation deteriorated suddenly and sharply. From Paris, she went to Vienna, and then to Slovenia. She soon moved to Hvar and in 1924 in Split, where she got a job as a painting teacher in a Gymnasium. When her illness worsened, she returned to Belgrade and was admitted to a sanitorium in Vračar, where she died of consumption on 25 February 1926. She was buried in the New Cemetery in Belgrade, in the family tomb next to her father.

In 1926, her book of poems entitled Palanka u planini i lutanja was posthumously published by Grafički umetnič zavod "Planeta".

== Publications ==
=== Poetry ===
- What are you afraid of?
- Melancholy
- White flags
- In the night
- Shadow
- Sparrows
- Man with a burden
- To my uncle Uroš

=== Short stories ===
- Two fires
- Visit
- Wandering
- Aneta
- Flower by the roadside
- Letter from Split
- Mihailo
- Palanka in the mountains

== Bibliography ==
- Hadžić, Zorica (2011). "Anđelija Lazarević: zaboravljena književnica i slikarka"; pogovor u: Anđelija. Lazarević; "Govor Stvari". Beograd: Službeni glasnik.COBISS 186354700
- Snežana Lazić: Anđelija Lazarević (1885–1926), str. 277–296, Muzeum godišnjak Narodnog muzeja u Šapcu, broj 15, Šabac 2014, ISSN 1450-8540

== See also ==
- List of Serbian women writers
- List of Serbian painters
