= Group MOST =

Group MOST (Serbian: Grupa MOST) is a Serbian non-governmental, non-profit association for cooperation and mediation in conflicts, established in 1992. It is dedicated to democratic changes in former Yugoslavia.

Group MOST was established in Belgrade at the beginning of 1992 and registered in 1993 at first as a collective member of the Center for Antiwar Action (CAA), until it became an independent organization in 1999. It has action centers on peace research and education, conflict analysis and management, organizational development and democratic changes of the educational system.

== See also ==
- Centre for Cultural Decontamination
