= Danica Bandić =

Serbian woman author and playwright

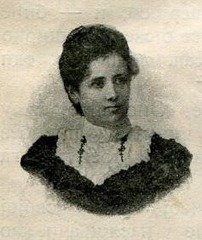
- Bandić ca. 1916
- Native name: Даница Бандић
- Born: Danica Telečki; Даница Телечки; September 30, 1871 Zagreb, Kingdom of Croatia-Slavonia, Transleithania, Austria-Hungary
- Died: October 26, 1950 (aged 79) Belgrade, Serbia, FPR Yugoslavia
- Occupation: Teacher, writer
- Relatives: Lazar Telecki (father)

Danica Bandić Telečki (30 September 1871, in Zagreb, Austria-Hungary – 26 October 1950, in Belgrade, Yugoslavia) was a Serbian writer.

== Early life ==
She was born in Zagreb in 1871 to mother Ana and father Laza Telečki, actor and playwright. While she was only 19 months old, her father died, and her mother Ana would follow when Danica was only eight years old. She was taken care of by her uncle Rista Telečki, playwright at the Serbian National Theatre, who educated Danica and tried not to make her feel the emptiness and difficulty of growing up without parents.

== Education ==
In the period from 1877 to 1881, she attended primary school in Zrenjanin and then in Kikinda. After finishing primary school, Danica went to Subotica, where she enrolled in the "Higher Girls' School" in 1881. Due to the great success in school, Danica enrolled in the "Teacher's College"(Preparandija) in Sombor right after high school, which she finished with great success in 1888.

== Family ==
After being employed at the school in Kikinda, Danica married Miloš Bandić, who was a teacher, school principal, actor, member of the "Serbian National Council" and delegate of the "Grand National Assembly of Vojvodina". Her husband supported her in teaching, and after retiring and moving to Belgrade in 1922, in both writing and translating. Miloš Bandić died in 1941 in Belgrade.

From her marriage to Bandić, she bore two children, Milan Bata and Jelisaveta Milica Bandić, who were both actors.

Milica was an actress National Theater in Belgrade, who during World War I played in the "Bosnia and Herzegovina Traveling Theater". Milan Bata Bandić played in a large number of theaters across the country, and he died at the age of 37.

== Career ==
After graduating from the "Teacher's College", Danica was first employed in 1888 at the age of seventeen in Kikinda. As a teacher in 1890, she received from the Serbian National Theater 1000 forints collected by friends of the theatre and admirers of Laza Telečki. Danica began her literary work by publishing short stories, notably "By Force in Preparation" for the magazine Women's World, of which she later became an associate editor. She was a professional translator and knew several languages, capable of translating works from German to Russian even. She wrote the humorous game "Emancipated", for which Matica Srpska gave her an award and mention in its official chronicle Letopis. Some of her plays were performed in the Serbian National Theater in 1922. Danica retired as a teacher and moved with her husband to Belgrade, where she continued to write and translate.

She published her most significant story, "Tera Baba Kozliće" in 1923, with illustrations by a Serbian painter Uroš Predić. After that, she published a large number of titles, such as "Farewell to Sneško Belić", "A Full Circle of Stories", "What a Swallow Tells" and many others.

During her writing career, she also published some twenty books of stories and plays. Her first works were aimed at adults and later she turned to children's literature. Owing to the great achievements she accomplished in the field of children's literature, Marko Car, the literary critic, called Danica "Uncle Jova in prose", comparing her work to the poems of the celebrated children author "Uncle Jova" - Jovan Jovanović Zmaj.

She collaborated with a large number of magazines: Women's World (from 1892 to 1902, 1904, 1906, 1908, 1911), Spomenak children's magazine (1893—1897, 1908), Bosanska vila (1895—1901, 1903, 1905, 1907, 1908), Letopis Matica srpska (1895), Brankovo kolo (1896, 1898-1899, 1902-1904, 1906, 1908-1910), Golub (1908), Naš list (1921-1923), Zorica (1925), Podmladak Crvenog krsta (1926-1940), Književni sever (1927).

== See also ==
- List of Serbian women writers
