= Lazar Telečki =

Serbian theater actor and director

Laza Telečki

Lazar (Laza) Telečki (Serbian Cyrillic: Лазаp – Лаза Телечки; Kumane now Novi Bečej, Serbia, then Austria-Hungary, 1841–1873) was a Serbian theater actor and director. He was a prominent member of Serbian National Theater in Novi Sad.

== Origin and family ==
He came from a poor family. His father died early and his mother took care of him and five siblings on her own.

He was married to Ana. Their daughter is Danica Bandić (1871–1950).

== Education ==
Telečki was educated with great success and in 1852 he was admitted to Karlovac Gymnasium. He continued his education in Vinkovci, and in Budim he completed a preparatory school for technical studies. After that, Laza Telečki went to Prague, where he enrolled in technical studies, but due to lack of funds, he had to leave school.

After completing partial studies, he came to Novi Sad, where he got a job as a clerk in a law office of Svetozar Miletić (1861–1862).

== Acting ==
When Theater was founded in Novi Sad in 1861, Telečki became actor. He also translated plays from German and staged performances of Shakespearean dramas

He played mostly roles from the domestic repertoire and in the first period, his activity was occasional. During his short career, he acted in Belgrade and Zagreb together with the greats of acting, such as: Dimitrije Ružić, Draginja Ružić, Miša Dimitrijević ( actor), Ilija Stanojević, Draga Spasić, Milka Grgurova and Pera Dobrinović.

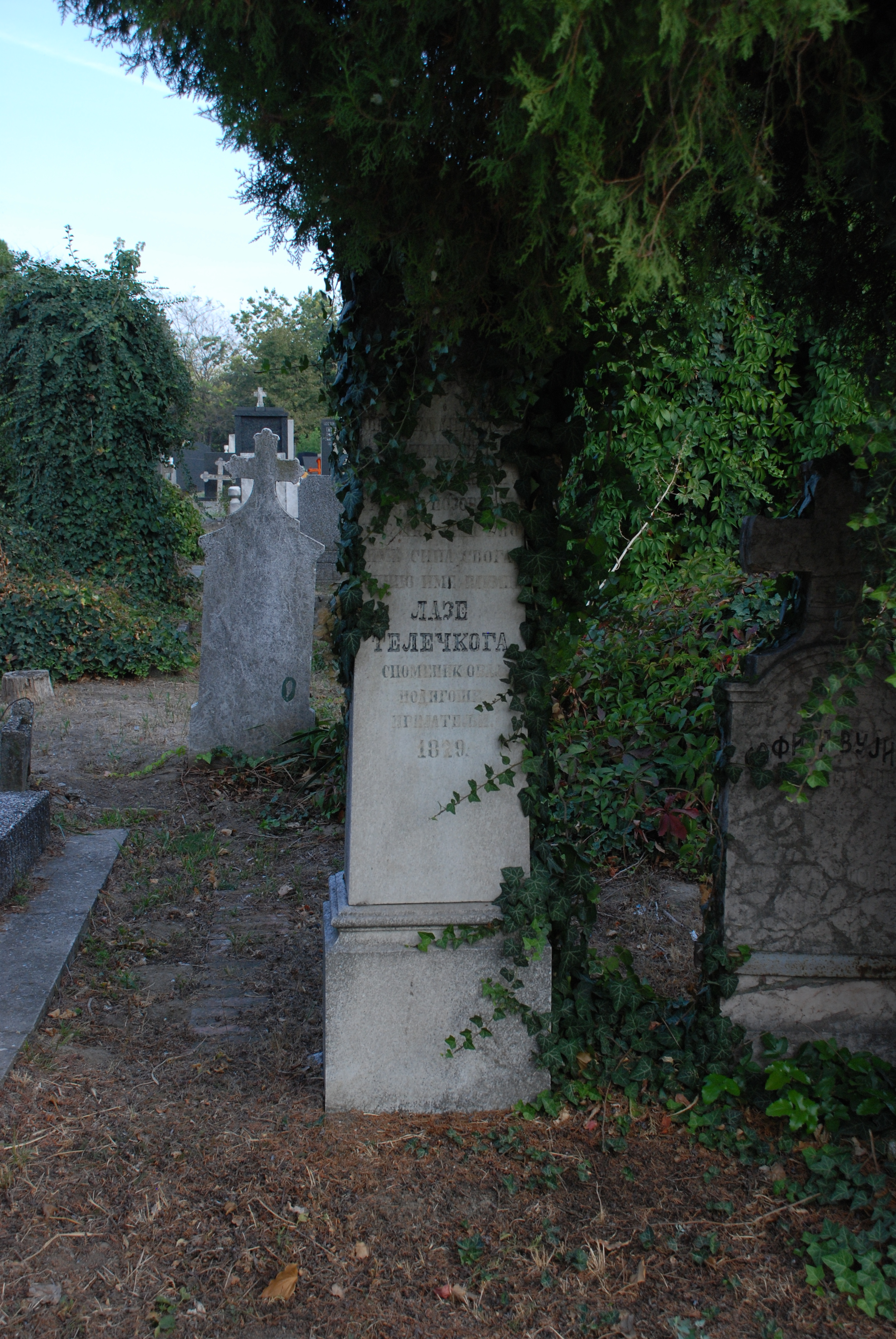
Tombstone of Laza Telečki at the Almaški cemetery in Novi Sad

== Cultural contribution ==
He transmitted and adapted to our circumstances about twenty foreign dramas. He also wrote the play "Đurađ Branković: The Last Despot of Smederevo."

== Legacy ==
- Today, "Days of Laza Telečki" are held in his birthplace, in memory of the great Serbian actor.
- In many places there are streets that bear his name, and the most famous is Novi Sad or the so-called "Street of Fun", which is the center of city events.

== Literature ==
- Andra Gavrilović, "Famous Serbs of the XIX century", Culture, Belgrade, 1990.
