= Vladimir Ćorović =

Serbian historian and academic (1885–1941)

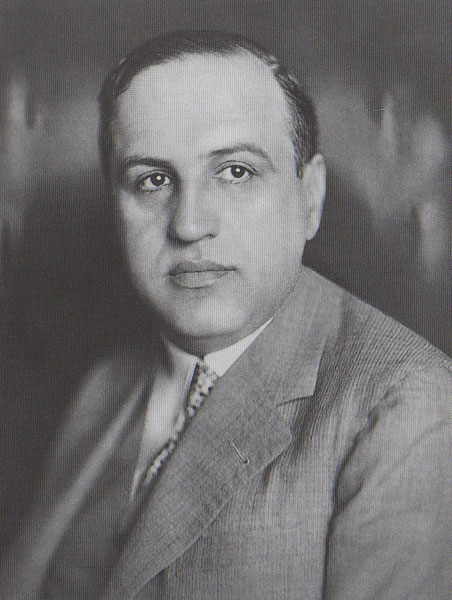
- Born: 27 October 1885; Mostar, Condominium of Bosnia and Herzegovina
- Died: 12 April 1941 (aged 55) near Elasona, Kingdom of Greece
- Education: University of Vienna (Ph.D., History, 1908)
- Occupations: Historian, professor
- Spouse: Jelena Skerlić Ćorović
- Relatives: Svetozar Ćorović (Brother)

Vladimir Ćorović (Serbian Cyrillic: Владимир Ћоровић; 27 October 1885 – 12 April 1941) was a Serb historian, university professor, author, and academic. Ćorović served two terms as the Rector of the University of Belgrade and twice as the Dean of the Faculty of Philosophy in Belgrade. His bibliography consists of more than 1000 works. Several of his books on the history of Serb, Yugoslav, Bosnian and Herzegovinian uprisings are considered to be definitive works on the subject.

== Biography ==
=== Education ===
Vladimir Ćorović was born in Mostar in Herzegovina, then under Ottoman sovereignty but under Austro-Hungarian administration, to a prominent Serb Orthodox family involved in business.

Ćorović finished primary school and the Gymnasium in Mostar, in which he was one of many future Serb intellectuals, among whom was also his brother the novelist Svetozar Ćorović. Ćorović continued his studies at the University of Vienna in 1904, studying Slavic Archaeology, History and Philology. He was active in the Serbian academic group „Zora“. Ćorović gained a Ph.D. in 1908 with a thesis on Lukijan Mušicki, a Serbian poet from the 18th century. His professors at Vienna were Vatroslav Jagić, Konstantin Jireček, and Milan Rešetar. Ćorović was to receive a golden ring from the University of Vienna as one of the top students. He refused to accept the award on account of Bosnian Crisis. In 1908 Ćorović went to Munich for specialized studies in Byzantine history and philology with Professor Karl Krumbacher.

Ćorović spent certain time in Bologna and Paris, exploring Old Slavic manuscripts. In a letter he noted that such job "is both hard and not meant for everyone". He moved to Sarajevo in September, 1909, and worked as a curator and later administrator at the National Museum of Bosnia and Herzegovina, this period started his intensive years of working. He was a contributor to many known Serbian journals, such as „Bosanska vila“, „Srpski književni glasnik“ and „Letopis Matice srpske“. Ćorović was also a secretary of the Serbian cultural society „Prosvjeta“ in Sarajevo and organizer of its annual publication (Calendar) of 1911.

=== Political activity ===
After the assassination of Archduke Franz Ferdinand of Austria on June 28, 1914, Austro-Hungarian authorities arrested Ćorović. He was indicted in the Banja Luka process (November 3, 1915 - April 22, 1916), along with other Serbs from Austria-Hungary accused of high treason. Ćorović was first sentenced to five years, but the High court increased it to eight years because of his contribution to the Serb cultural progress through Prosvjeta. The new Austro-Hungarian Emperor, Charles I of Austria, after international pressure by the Spanish king, released political prisoners in 1917 granting them amnesty.

At the end of World War I, Ćorović moved to Zagreb, jubilant with its Croat-Serb coalition in power and the National Council of Slovenes, Croats and Serbs in favour of unification with Serbia. With several Yugoslavist poets and writers (Ivo Andrić and Niko Bartulović among others) Ćorović had established the Književni Jug, a literary review. In parallel, Ćorović worked closely with other Yugoslav politicians from different provinces within the Austro-Hungarian territories. Čorović was present at the solemn proclamation of the formation of Kingdom of Serbs, Croats and Slovenes in Belgrade on December 1, 1918.

Dissatisfied by the treatment of the Serbian victims after the war, Ćorović wrote the Black Book (Belgrade-Sarajevo, 1920), about the large-scale persecution and murders of Serbs in Bosnia and Herzegovina.

=== University career ===
Vladimir Ćorović was a Europe-wide renowned scholar. Ćorović was professor of Serbian history at the University of Belgrade since 1919, and Rector of the Belgrade University in the 1934–35 and 1935–36 academic years. Ćorović published over 1,000 works. He rarely touched upon Byzantine themes, but the Byzantine component in his professional education was very significant for the very important support for the personnel changes which, in the 1930s, brought about the advancement of Byzantine studies at the University of Belgrade. His scholarly works includes critical interpretations of Byzantine and Serbian medieval documents, studies regarding medieval historiography and various monographs devoted to the Serbian monasteries of Bosnia (Tvrdoš, Duži, Zavala) to the relations between the Serbs of Montenegro and Muslims in Albania.

Mount Athos and Hilandar ("Sveta Gora i Hilandar") was published by the Hilandar monastic brotherhood in 1985. Ćorović did not manage to finish the work, which was untitled, due to the Axis invasion of Yugoslavia in April 1941.

His book on diplomatic and political history, regarding relations between Serbia and Austria-Hungary in the early twentieth century, was prevented from being distributed in 1936, after the ambassador of Nazi Germany intervened at the Yugoslav Foreign Ministry, labeling Ćorović detailed scholarly work (based on published diplomatic correspondence and unpublished sources in various languages) as alleged anti-German propaganda. For similar reasons, the first volume of diplomatic correspondence of Serbia, prepared also by Vladimir Ćorović was never officially published, again at the demand of Nazi German representatives for its allegedly anti-German attitudes.

Following the Royal Yugoslav Government on its way to exile during the Invasion of Yugoslavia in April 1941, he died in a plane crash on 12 April 1941 on Mount Olympus in Greece.

== Legacy ==
Radovan Samardžić dubbed him "the last polyhistor" and stated that Ćorović is one of the great Serb historians.

Bosnian historian Boris Nilević stated that "Ćorović had an emotional incentive but he remained impartial in his conclusions about the treated issues".

Some critics noted that in the name of Yugoslav unity Ćorović did not mention the ethnic compositions of several divisions which committed massacres and war crimes over Serb civilians in Mačva in WWI, such as predominantly Croat 42nd Home Guard Infantry Division.

Streets in Belgrade and Niš are named after him.

Vladimir Ćorović Award was established in his honour.

== Selected works ==
- Ćorović, Vladimir (1911). "Hercegovački manastiri". Glasnik Zemaljskog muzeja u Bosni i Hercegovini. 23: 545–553.
- Ćorović, Vladimir (1920). Pokreti i dela. Belgrade: Izdavačka knjižarnica Gece Kona.
- Ćorović, Vladimir (1920). Crna knjiga: Patnje Srba Bosne i Hercegovine za vreme Svetskog Rata 1914-1918 (1. ed.). Belgrade-Sarajevo: Đurđević.
- Ćorović, Vladimir (1921). "Domentijan i Danilo (Jedna glava iz "Južnoslovenske hagiografije")". Prilozi za književnost, jezik, istoriju i folklor. 1: 21–33.
- Ćorović, Vladimir (1921). "Biografija Sv. Save od Kirila Živkovića" (PDF). Južnoslovenski filolog. 2: 122–123. Archived from the original (PDF) on 2025-02-15.
- Ćorović, Vladimir (1923). Luka Vukalović i hercegovački ustanci od 1852-1862. godine. Belgrade: Srpska kraljevska akademija.
- Ćorović, Vladimir (1924). Velika Srbija. Belgrade: Narodno delo.
- Ćorović, Vladimir (1924). "Despot Đurađ Branković prema Konavoskom ratu". Glas SKA. 62: 24–39.
- Bosna i Hercegovina (Srpska književna zadruga, Belgrade, 1927)
- Luka Vukalović i hercegovački ustanci od 1852-1862 (Srpska kraljevska akademija: Belgrade, 1923)
- Ujedinjenje (Narodno delo, Belgrade, 1928)
- Mostar i njegova srpska pravoslavna opština (Belgrade, 1933)
- Istorija Jugoslavije (Narodno delo, Belgrade, 1933)
- Odnosi između Srbije i Austrougarske u XX veku (Državna štamparija Kraljevine Jugoslavije, Belgrade, 1936)
- Političke prilike u Bosni i Hercegovini, Politika, Belgrade 1939
- Historija Bosne, vol. I (Srpska kraljevska akademija, Belgrade, 1940).

Posthumously published:

- Sveta Gora i Hilandar do XVI veka, (Belgrade 1985).
- Istorija Srba, vol. I-III (BIGZ, Belgrade, 1989).
- Portreti iz novije srpske istorije, Srpska književna zadruga, Belgrade 1990, ed. by D. T. Bataković)
- Istorija srpskog naroda (Ars Libri, Belgrade, 1997)

== Sources ==
- Bataković, Dušan T., ed. (2005). Histoire du peuple serbe. Lausanne: L’Age d’Homme. ISBN 9782825119587.
- Samardžić, Radovan (1976). "Vladimir Ćorović: Poslednji polihistorik". Pisci Srpske Istorije. Belgrade: Prosveta: 245–253.
  - Samardžić, Radovan (2014). "Vladimir Ćorović: The last polyhistor". Balcanica (45): 435–442. doi:10.2298/BALC1445435S.
- Dušan T. Bataković, "Skica za portret jednog istoričara", in, Portreti iz novije srpske istorije", SKZ, Beograd 1990, pp. 283–312.
- Jeremija D. Mitrović, "Bibliografija Vladimira Ćorovića", Istorijsli glasnik, 1-2, Beograd, 1976, pp. 205–313.

Academic offices
Preceded by Aleksandar Belić	Rector of the University of Belgrade; 1933–1934	Succeeded by Ivan Đaja
Preceded by Ivan Đaja	Rector of the University of Belgrade; 1935–1936	Succeeded by Dragoslav B. Jovanović
Preceded by Veselin Čajkanović	Dean of the Faculty of Philosophy; 1933–1934	Succeeded by Himself
Preceded by Himself	Dean of the Faculty of Philosophy; 1934–1935	Succeeded by Milivoje S. Lozanić
