= Elizabeth Christitch =

Irish and Serbian journalist and writer (1861–1933)

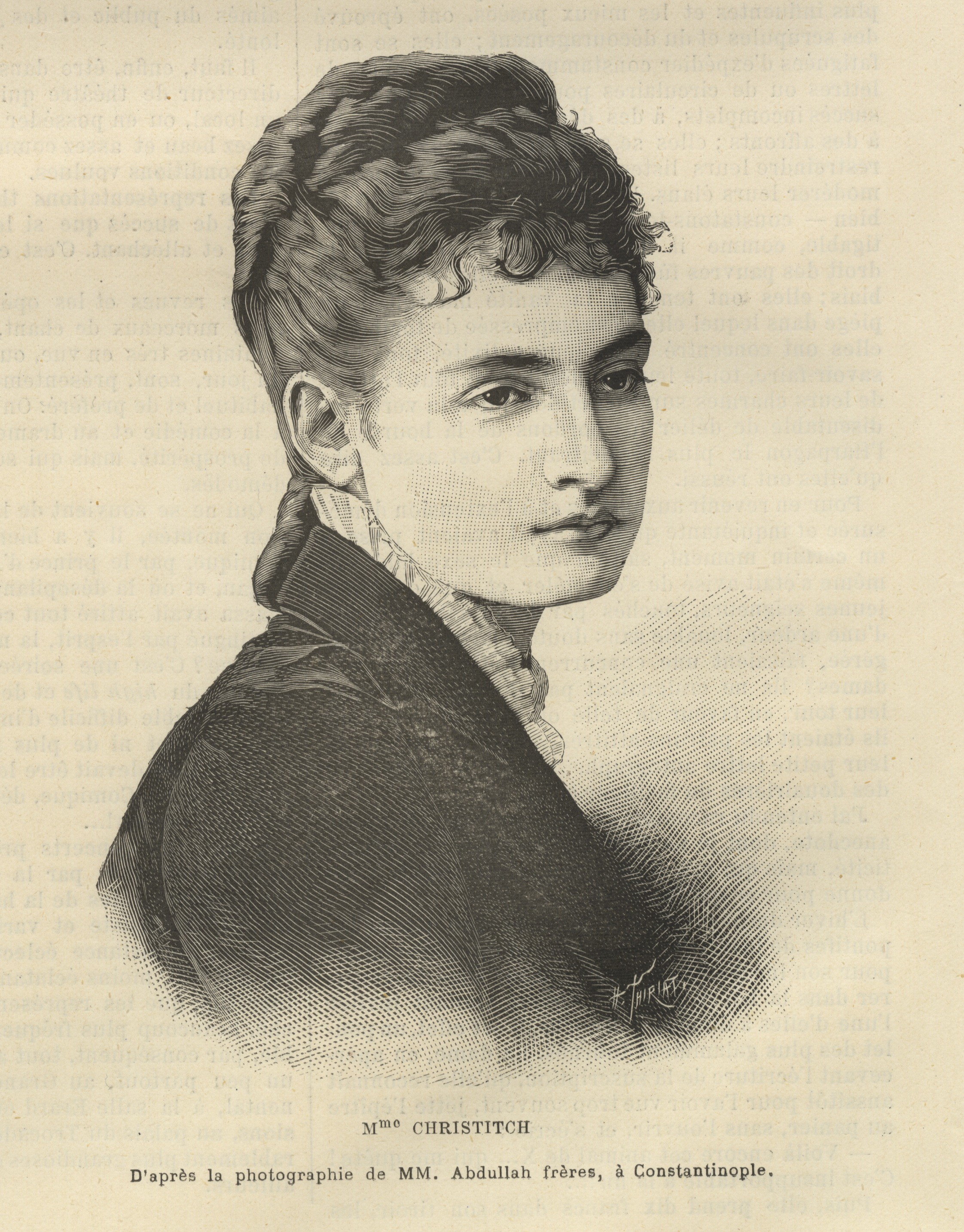
- Wood-engraving by Henri Thiriat based on Abdullah Freres' photograph 1889
- Born: 1861; Patrickswell, Limerick, Ireland
- Died: 26 January 1933 (aged 71–72); London, England, United Kingdom

Elizabeth Christitch (1861 – 26 January 1933), known by her pen name Ben Hurst, was an Irish journalist, writer, poet, and translator.

== Biography ==
Elizabeth O'Brien was born in Patrickswell, Limerick, Ireland to John O'Brien of Lough Gur, County Limerick.

She was educated at the convent of the Faithful Companions of Jesus and Mary at Bruff in Co. Limerick and at the Ursuline convent at Gravelines near Dunkirk in France.

Following her schooling, she became governess in the household of the Polish noble family of Swinarski at Strzałkowo near Poznań.

She married Colonel Ljubomir N. Christitch (also written Hristić) of the Royal Serbian Army at the cathedral of Poznan. After helping to found the Catholic Women's Suffrage Society in 1911, she settled in his home country and during the Balkan War in 1913, she worked as a nurse for the Serbian soldiers. In World War I, she worked in Belgrade for the Red Cross.

Christitch was a journalist for the Tribune, the Chicago Tribune, several London daily papers, as well as contributing fiction to various periodicals. She translated the Serbian national anthem into English, and her English-language version was sung in Britain during the war. Christitch used the pen-name "Ben Hurst". Her best known novel was The Pride of Garr (1925). She wrote on Balkan and international politics as well as women's suffrage and Irish Home rule.

Christitch was an original member of the Serbian Relief Fund Committee. She and her daughter, Annie, were prisoners in Serbia for three and a half years. Christitch gained her freedom through assistance from the Pope. She and her husband had three children. Their son was General Nikola Christitch of the Royal Yugoslav Army and Aide de Camp to both Kings, Alexander I of Yugoslavia and Peter II of Yugoslavia and their daughters were fellow patriot Annie Christitch and Janie Christitch who was later Mother Mary of the Cross. Christitch was given a blessing for her work by Pope Benedict XV. In 1919, Elsabeth Christitch was given a Vatican Papal audience with Benedict XV, the head of the Catholic faith, who was reported as having said "we should like to see women electors everywhere". Christitch died in London on 26 January 1933 due to a weak heart.

== Awards and honours ==
- Christitch was awarded medals from both the Serbian government and the American Red Cross for her work.

== Works ==
- Light and Shade in Albania, 1913
- A word on woman suffrage
- The Slovenes : A Small Nationality, 1918
- The Slovenes and Their Leaders, 1918
- Church conditions in Jugo-slavia, 1920
- Reunion and fusion of the southern slavs, 1921
- The Pride of Garr, 1925
