= Jelena Skerlić Ćorović =

Serbian writer, translator and critic (1887–1960)

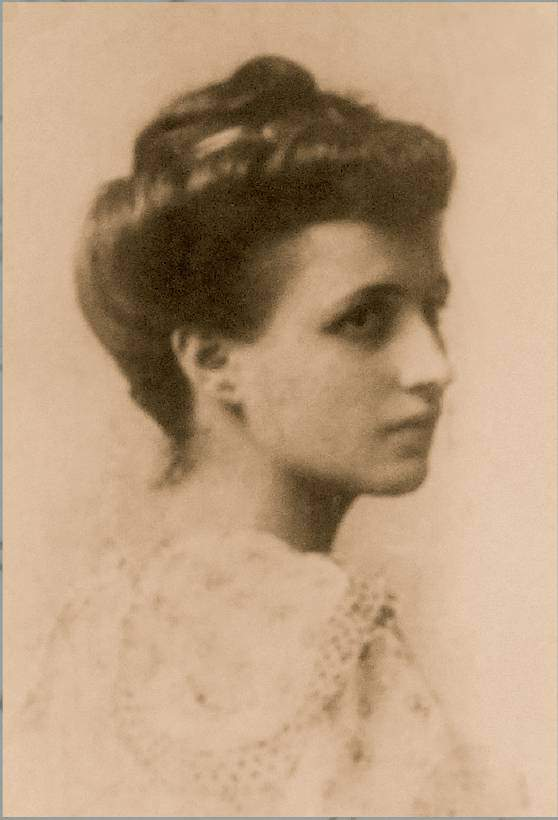
- A photo of Skerlić Ćorović
- Born: 16 October 1887; Belgrade, Kingdom of Serbia
- Died: 16 February 1960 (aged 72); Belgrade, FPR Yugoslavia
- Occupations: writer translator

Jelena Skerlić Ćorović (Serbian Cyrillic: Јелена Скерлић Ћоровић; 16 October 1887 – 16 February 1960) was a Serbian writer, translator, literary critic and French language professor. She translated a large number of foreign literary works into Serbian.

== Biography ==
Jelena was born in 1887 in Belgrade to a well-to-do family. Her parents were Persida and Miloš Skerlić. Her brother was Jovan Skerlić, an influential Serbian literary critic. Jelena's mother Persida Skerlić, who died in 1893, was devoted to her children and family and had a great influence on them, encouraging them to learn and study.

In 1907, Jelena graduated from the Women's High School, a grande école in Belgrade. She then enrolled as a part-time student at the University of Belgrade and studied French under the guidance of professor Bogdan Popović, while also working as a French teacher in a private school in Smederevo. During her studies, Jelena met Vladimir Ćorović, whom she married in 1910. She had two daughters, Mirjana and Milica.

The Ćorović family initially changed their place of residence frequently, living in Sarajevo (1910–1914), Jajce and Banjaluka (1914–1917), Zagreb, Dubrovnik, and Mostar (1917–1919). In 1919 they returned to Belgrade and Vladimir Ćorović became a tenured professor at the Faculty of Philosophy, University of Belgrade. During the period 1920–1922, Jelena worked as a French teacher at a Gymnasium in Belgrade.

Skerlić Ćorović remodelled her apartment into a salon, where the elite of the interwar period gathered every Tuesday to discuss literature, history, culture and current events.

She died on 16 February 1960 in her home in Belgrade.

=== Work ===
Jelena translated works from French, Russian and English into Serbian. From French and Russian she mostly translated novels and short stories, namely the works of Jules Verne, Anatole France, Guy de Maupassant, André Theuriet, Alphonse Daudet, Octave Mirbeau, Claude Farrère, Nicolas Chamfort, Jules Lemaître, Ernest Renan, Henri Lavedan and others. Among her favourite Russian authors were Fyodor Dostoevsky and Maksim Gorky. She also produced original works, including Srpski književni glasnik, Narod, Bosanska vila, Književni jug, Misli, Prilozima za književnost, jezik, istoriju i folklor and Politika.

In 1932, she published a literary analysis of the poetry of Omar Khayyam, accompanied by an adaptation of nine rubaiyat based on Edward Fitzgerald's translation, together with a second volume containing seventy-five rubaiyat which she adapted from the prosaic French translation of the original. She wrote a series of articles on Milovan Glišić, Bogdan Popović and Pavle Popović, as well as autobiographical sketches of her childhood.

Towards the end of her life, Jelena predominantly worked on her memoirs – Život među ljudima ("Life Among People") – which included testimonies about her husband Vladimir Ćorović, brother Jovan Skerlić, and her friends Isidora Sekulić, Desanka Maksimović, Branislav Nušić, Nikola Pašić, as well as other contemporaries. Several translations and unfinished memoirs remained in her papers after her death.

== Personal life ==
She was the sister of literary historian and critic Jovan Skerlić and the wife of historian Vladimir Ćorović.

== Works ==
=== Articles and other texts ===
- Knjiga jedne žene vojnika januar (1928)
- Mara Đorđević - Malagurska: Vita Đanina i druge pripovetke iz bunjevačkog života (1933)
- Jedna persiska pesma i jedna bosanska sevdalinka (1938)
- Porodična pisma J.Skerlića (1964)
- O Skerlićevim roditeljima: neke moje uspomene iz detinjstva i mladosti (1964)
- Sećanje na Milovana Glišića (1997)
- Bogdan i Pavle Popović (1998)

=== Selected translations ===
- Mečkari (1905)
- Mala Roka (1909)
- In the family (1910)
- History of my books. Numa Rumestan (1912)
- Mr. Paran (1912)
- Field Restriction and Origin of Property (from "Penguin Island") (1913)
- Protector (1914)
- Maxims and Thoughts (1914)
- Our Heart (1917)
- Sebastian Roch (1919)
- From Sailor's Life: Stories (1920)
- Epicurus' Garden (1920)
- The Life of Jesus (1921)
- Skinny Cat (1921)
- Buddhism (1921)
- Dulcinea. On the Margins of Don Quixote (1923)
- Excerpts from the diary of Mrs. Clelia Eponine Dipon (1795-179 ...). On the margins of General Bonaparte's proclamation (1923)
- First thought. On the Margins of Zend-Avesta (1923)
- Revenge (1923)

== See also ==
- List of Serbian women writers
