= Tamara Lujak =

Serbian writer, translator, editor and journalist

Tamara Lujak (Serbian Cyrillic: Тамара Лујак; born 1976 in Belgrade) is a Serbian writer, translator, editor and journalist. Her primary interests are in science fiction and fantasy, compiling short stories, aphorisms, haiku and book reviews. She is a member of the "Lazar Komarčić" Fan Fiction Club, Haiku Club "Shiki" and "Devotees of Comic Art Hiperion".

Her aphorisms and short stories can be found in a variety of literary magazines and collections. Her aphorisms include Naš trag, Putevi kulture; Aforizmi i aforističari 6 (2006) and Dribling duha (2007). Her short stories include Galaksija, Politikin Zabavnik, Naš trag, Blic zabave, Trash, Nova zora, Putevi kulture, Mons Aureus and Kvartal. Anthologies include Nova srpska SF i OFF priča (1999), Najkraće priče 2004 (2005), Jutro nad Ozrenom 2009 (2009), West Herzegowina Fest No. 7. (2009), Priče o dinosaurima (2009), Ja sam priča (2009), Leksikon božjih ljudi (2010), Satirična priča 2009 (2010), Magija festivalskog šarenila (2010), Slatke priče (2011), Zbornik radova konferencije „Razvoj astronomije kod Srba VI“ (2011) and Deseti krug (2011). Some of her stories were translated to Polish.

She has organized literary competitions. Among them are The moment of Inspiration (2007) and Win the Ikebana (2007).

She published the book (collection of short stories) Vilina planina in 2006. One of the stories from the book was made into a theatrical play Četvoroprsti and performed by the Dramatic Studio Alisa in 2007 (scenario Bogdan Čurguz, producer Dragana Stojiljković).

== Bibliography ==
- Vilina planina, 2006, collection of 11 short stories.
- Rečnik straha, 2014, lexicon.
- Kako se plaše deca, 2015, collection of monster fairy tales.
- Rečnik slovenske mitologije, 2021, dictionary of Slovenian mythology
- Rečnik srpskih mitoloških bića, 2021, dictionary of Serbian mythology

== Awards ==
- Diploma of Royal literary club Karađorđević for the best aphorism in 2006.
- Third prize (Association of Artists "Multi Art") for short story "Jelka" in 2006.
- First prize (Association of Women "Sva lepota sveta") for short story "Valja kadgod i staru baku poslušati" in 2006.
- First prize (Association of Citizens SCI&FI) for short story "Labyrinth" in 2006.
