= Henri Thiriat =

French wood-engraver (1843–1926)

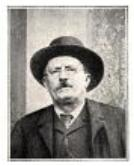
- Born: Henri Amédée Thiriat; November 22, 1843; Paris, France
- Died: April 9, 1926 (aged 82); Villiers-sur-Marne, France
- Spouse: Élisabeth Verpy

Henri Thiriat (22 November 1843 – 9 April 1926) was a French engraver who carried out a large part of his activity at L'Illustration.

== Biography ==
L'Illustration of 5 December 1885, engraving by Thiriat after a lithograph by Émile Bayard

Henri Amédée Thiriat was born on 22 November 1843 in the former 11th arrondissement of Paris.

He started as a wood engraver, and around 1860 joined the magazine L'Illustration, where he spent most of his career. He adapted to the evolution of typographic techniques, and until his death collaborated with various newspapers. He died on 9 April 1926. L'Illustration of 24 April 1926 devotes an obituary article to him, reporting that “he was one of this galaxy of artists who each week, with a news document, created an original work”. Married to Élisabeth Verpy, he had a son, Paul Henri Thiriat (1868-1943), who first exercised the same profession of wood engraver, before becoming a painter and illustrator.

=== The beginnings of photoengraving ===
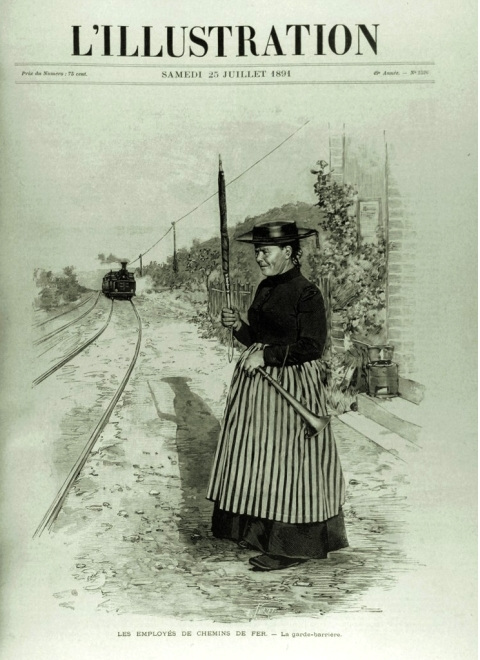
La garde-barrière, published on 25 July 1891

For almost twenty years, between 1880 and 1900, he provided the press with images, and researched reproduction techniques that would lead to photo-engraving. On 25 July 1891, L'Illustration published La garde-barrière on its front page, which is considered to be one of the first uses of photography in the press. It was Henri Thiriat who adapted the reproduction technique using a film-coated woodcut process based on Ernest Clair-Guyot's photo, which was not yet the definitive photomechanical process subsequently adopted.
