= Centre for Cultural Decontamination =

Organization based in Belgrade, Serbia

The Centre for Cultural Decontamination (Serbo-Croatian: Centar za kulturnu dekontaminscuju/ Центар за културну деконтаминацију) also known as the CZKD, is an independent cultural institution located at 21 Birčaninova Street in Belgrade, Serbia. The centre was established in 1994 as a response to the political and cultural climate in Serbia.

Set in a building that was previously, until 1941, the Veljković Family House's courtyard art pavilion, the centre works against "nationalism, xenophobia, intolerance, hatred and fear." The institute functions as a gallery, community and a professional forum. It was founded by Borka Pavićević, previously a principal of the Yugoslav Drama Theater.

== Criticism ==
The centre's foreign funding was criticised by journalist Ranko Munitić in 2005, during Serbian political talk show Utisak nedelje on TV channel B92:

What I was saying was directed at one type of people that I passionately, frankly cannot stand, not them personally, but the job they do, these centers for decontamination, where I ask the question of who has the right to put oneself in the role of some decontaminator, [to decontaminate] let's say me. Here we return to the Bible, who is the one who is allowed to cast a stone? I am and we all are contaminated, but who is the one who considers himself or herself pure enough to decontaminate us others? And then when you look through it a little bit, it turns out that this is quite another matter. It's not about criticizing their community to the world, that's fine, but about ratting their community to the world for big money. That's something I am ready to die fighting against it. My whole life I am fighting against things that I think are not good and that cost me, of course, but it was worth it, but to do any of it for money, for foreign money, I am deliberately saying foreign money, because...you don't go outside [abroad] to clean your own backyard, and if you do go outside [abroad] to clean your own backyard, then cleaning your own backyard wasn't on your mind. Anyway, had I done what was expected from a large part of my profession, the so-called colleagues and so on, had I done what they [decontaminators] almost requested from me, somewhere in '94, '95, '96, and that was to return to Zagreb where I came from, today I would have been welcomed on the red carpet from those ladies and gentlemen who decontaminate this situation. I would have been welcomed as a symbol – here, we are fixing the situation, we are all brothers, we are all this, we are all that. Why – because that is a performance, because that is a show, and based on that performance someone says – "fine, here you go, the reward of $100,000".

— -Ranko Munitić, film & TV critic, essayist, theorist

== See also ==
- Group MOST
