= Ranko Munitić =

Theorist, critic, journalist and art historian

Ranko Munitić Ранко Мунитић
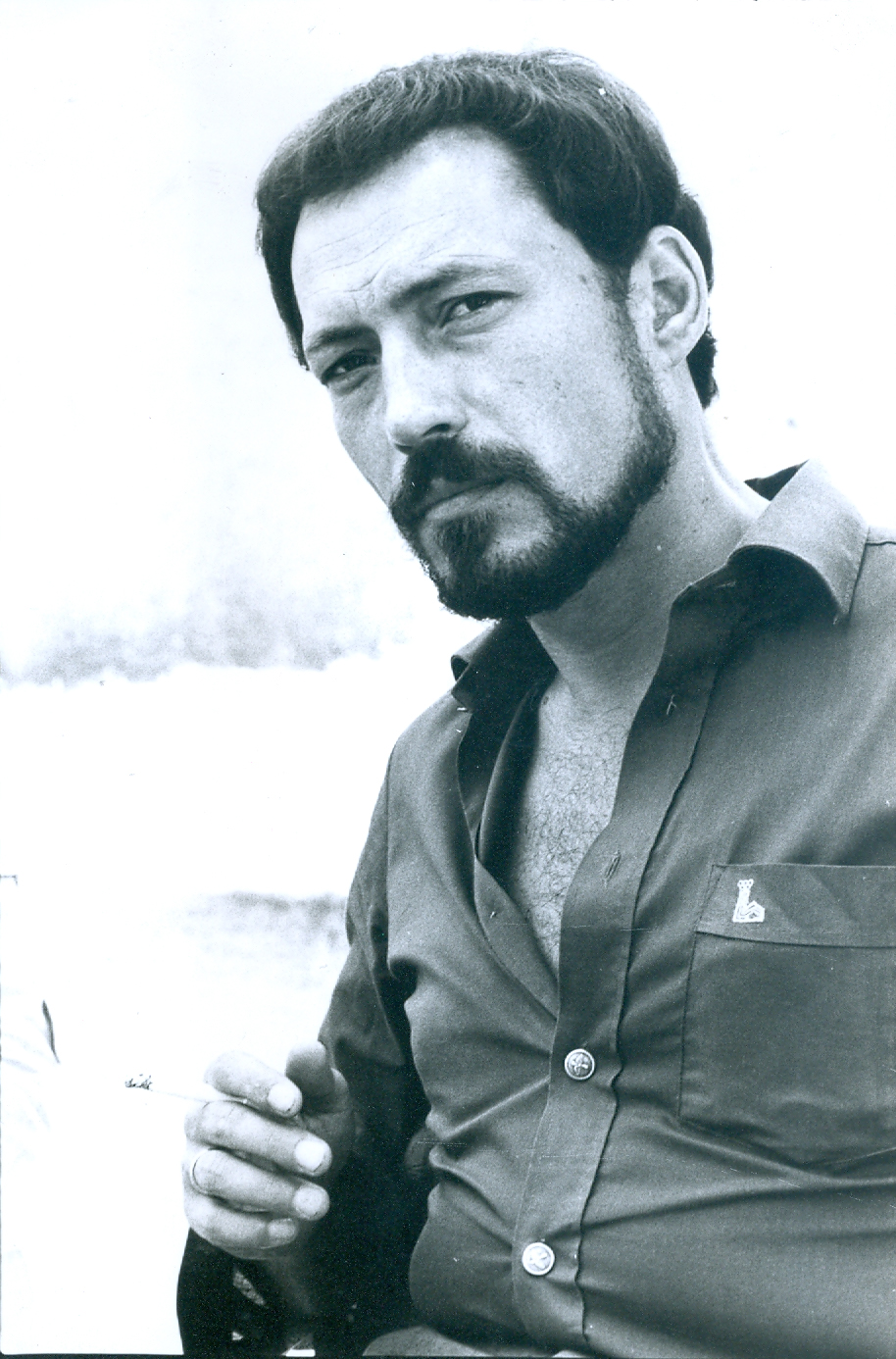
- Born: 3 April 1943; Zagreb, Independent State of Croatia
- Died: 28 March 2009 (aged 65); Belgrade, Serbia
- Occupation: Film director
- Spouse: Zorica Jevremović Munitić

Ranko Munitić (Serbo-Croatian Cyrillic: Ранко Мунитић; 3 April 1943 – 28 March 2009) was a Yugoslav theorist, critic, journalist and art historian – one of the most important experts on popular culture and media in Yugoslavia.

His fields of interest were most usually Yugoslav film, cinematographic animation, comics, documentary film, artistic fantasy, television, acting and actors.

He was also a film and television screenwriter, director, host and producer.

== Biography ==
Ranko Munitić was born during the World War II on 3 April 1943 in Zagreb, which was then in the Independent State of Croatia. As a child he lived in Trogir. He studied history of art at the Faculty of Philosophy in Zagreb.

He met Zorica Jevremović (a director, dramatist, theorist of media and culture) at the amateur film festival "Mala Pula", on 24 June 1968. The two of them married in Belgrade on 1 May 1971, where Zorica added the surname Munitić to hers, then they went to Zagreb. In November of the same year, they return to Belgrade, where they lived together until the end of March 2009 (when Munitić died).

Work

Munitić first article was published in high school magazine Polet in May 1961. He published first professional article in the magazine for art and culture Telegram, in November 1962. Since then he publishes critiques, essays, bigger studies and was an author of more than 70 monographs. His fields of interest were most commonly Yugoslav film, cinematographic animation, comics, documentary film, artistic fantasy, television, acting and actors.

First time he appeared as a scenarist in film "Traveling Cinema" (1964). He wrote screenplays for animated and documentary movies, television shows, and he cooperated on several screenplays for featured movies. Also wrote a screenplay for Dejan Šorak film "Officer with a Rose" (1987).

As a member of the board of directors of ASIFA (International Animated Film Association) he participated in the seventies and eighties in the global enterprise of popularization and promotion of cinematographic animation. He was a member of juries and committees at about twenty festivals of short and animated films all around the world. He edited hundreds of retrospectives of Yugoslav films abroad, especially of Zagreb School of Animated Films and Belgrade school of documentary films.

Since 1960s he participates in the main TV shows on films in Zagreb and Belgrade, and since 1980s he created, for TV studio of Novi Sad, eighty one-hour portraits of leading actors in his own series "Night with Stars" ("Veče sa zvezdama").

Ethnically, he sometimes called himself a Hrbin ("Croat-Serb"). About his personal identity he said:

"My father was from Trogir and mother from Zagreb. My father's father was also from Trogir, while grandmother was of Italian origin. Mother's father was Slovenian and her mother was countess from Vienna. That's why it was always difficult for me to define my nationality because I am a little bit of everything. I never had understanding for discrimination by nation, faith, race..."

— Ranko Munitić

His destiny he defined in this manner:

"By nationality I am a sea-man, by party membership I am a film-fan, by vocation a criticus vulgaris, by conviction an alternative, and by status a freeman i.e. a marginal. (…) A man who believes in the right of his own choice and in life until death."

— Ranko Munitić

Since December 2011 in Belgrade was open the Media Center "Ranko Munitić" founded by Zorica Jevremović Munitić. Since April 2012 the Center establishes award "Twinkler from Trogir" ̶ "Trepetalo iz Trogira – Regional award for the media Ranko Munitić". Since then it was awarded to Nedeljko Dragić, Puriša Đorđević, Dušan Makavejev, Lordan Zafranović and Karpo Aćimović Godina.

Within the Center, since December 2012, a quarterly multilingual regional magazine for media and culture Mediantrop, targeting the South European region, is being published.

== Bibliography (books) ==
Yugoslav / Serbian film
- Prometheus from Viševica Island (Prometej s otoka Viševice), Zagreb, 1965.
- Battle of Neretva (Bitka na Neretvi), Zagreb, 1969.
- This People Will Live Forever (Živjet će večno ovaj narod), Zagreb, 1974.
- Those sweet movies' lies (Te slatke filmske laže), Belgrade, 1977.
- 207 Festival Days in Pula (207 festivalskih dana u Puli), Pula, 1978.
- Stages of Yugoslav Film (Obdobja jugoslavenskoga filma), Ljubljana 1978
- Yugoslav Film's Case (Jugoslavenski filmski slučaj), Split, 1980.
- Serbian Century of Film (Srpski vek filma), Belgrade, 1999.
- Belgrade Film Critic's Circle I (Beogradski filmski kritičarski krug I), Niš, 2002.
- Cinema Club Belgrade or Trojan Horse of Yugoslav Modern Film (Kino klub Beograd ili Trojanski konj jugoslovenskog modernog filma), Belgrade, 2003.
- Belgrade Film Critic's Circle II (Beogradski filmski kritičarski krug II), Niš, 2005.
- Good-Bye, Yugo-Film (Adio, Jugo-film), Belgrade, 2005.
- Belgrade Film Critic's Circle III (Beogradski filmski kritičarski krug III), Niš, 2007.
- Film Image and Reality (Filmska slika i stvarnost), Belgrade, 2009.
- The Question of Film Critic (Pitanje filmske kritike), Belgrade, 2012.

Authors

- Jean Vigo, Ljubljana 1970.
- Živojin Pavlović, Belgrade, 1997.
- Srđan Karanović, Belgrade, 2000.
- Goran Marković, Belgrade, 2001.
- Emir Kusturica, Belgrade, 2001.
- Martinac, Zagreb, 2011.

Documentary Film

- Belgrade School of Documentary Film (Beogradska škola dokumentarnog filma), Belgrade, 1967.
- On Documentary Film (O dokumentarnom filmu), Belgrade, 1975.
- Film Kinds and Genres (Filmske zvrsti in žanri), Ljubljana, 1977.
- Documentary Film – Yes or No? (Dokumentarni film – da ili ne?), Belgrade, 1982.

Animated film, theory

- On Animation (O animaciji), Belgrade, 1973.
- The State of Animated Miracles (Dežela animiranih čudes), Ljubljana, 1976.
- Theory of Animation (Teorija animacije), Belgrade, 1981.
- Introduction into the Aesthetics of Cinematographic Animation (Uvod u estetiku kinematografske animacije), Zagreb – Belgrade, 1982.
- Critical Retrospective of the Zagreb School (Kritička retrospektiva zagrebačke škole), Zagreb, 1982.
- Aesthetics of Animation (Estetika animacije), Belgrade, 2007.
- Collected Texts on Animation (Zbornik o animaciji), Belgrade, 2009
- Aesthetics of Animation (Estetika animacije), Zagreb, 2012.

Animated film, history

- Zagreb Circle of Animated Film I (Zagrebački krug crtanog filma I), Zagreb, 1978.
- Zagreb Circle of Animated Film II (Zagrebački krug crtanog filma II), Zagreb, 1978.
- Zagreb Circle of Animated Film III (Zagrebački krug crtanog filma III), Zagreb, 1978.
- Cinematographic Animation in Yugoslavia (Kinematografska animacija u Jugoslaviji), Belgrade, 1979.
- Five World Festivals in Zagreb (Pet svjetskih festivala u Zagrebu), Zagreb, 1984.
- 80 Films of Zagreb School (80 filmova Zagrebačke škole), Novi Sad, 1984.
- Zagreb Circle of Animated Film IV (Zagrebački krug crtanog filma IV), Zagreb, 1986.
- Half a Century of Animated Film in Serbia (Pola veka animiranog filma u Srbiji), Belgrade, 1999.

Fantastika (Fantasy and science fiction)

- Fantasy on Screen I (Fantastika na ekranu I), Belgrade, 1971.
- Fantasy on Screen II (Fantastika na ekranu II), Belgrade, 1973.
- Alice on the Journey through Underground and Space (Alisa na putu kroz podzemlje i kroz svemir), Belgrade, 1986.
- Monsters We Loved I (Čudovišta koja smo voleli I), Belgrade 1990.
- Monsters We Loved II (Čudovišta koja smo voleli II), Belgrade 1997.
- Monsters We Loved 1 (Čudovišta koja smo voleli 1), Belgrade, 2007.
- Monsters We Loved 2 (Čudovišta koja smo voleli 2), Belgrade, 2008.
- Monsters We Loved 3 (Čudovišta koja smo voleli 3), Belgrade, 2008.
- Monsters We Loved 4 (Čudovišta koja smo voleli 4), Belgrade, 2009.
- Monsters We Loved 5 (Čudovišta koja smo voleli 5), Belgrade, 2011.

Comicsology

- Comics – The Ninth Art (Strip – deveta umetnost), Belgrade, 1975.
- Sexarion superstrip, Belgrade, 1988.
- Fucking comics, Belgrade, 2006.
- The Ninth Art, Comics (Deveta umetnost, strip), Belgrade, 2006.
- The Ninth Art, Comics – second edition (Deveta umetnost, strip – drugo izdanje), Belgrade, 2006.
- Comics, the Ninth Art (Strip, deveta umjetnost), Zagreb, 2010.

Actors – monographs

- Pavle Vuisić, Niš, 1985.
- Olivera Marković, Niš, 1988.
- Janez Vrhovec, Niš, 1989.
- Rade Marković, Niš, 1990.
- Dušan Janićijević, Niš, 1993.
- Milena Dravić, Niš, 1995.
- Ljuba Tadić, Niš, 1997.
- Mića Tomić, Niš, 1998.
- Bata Stojković, Belgrade-Niš, 1999.
- Dušica Žegarac, Niš, 2000.
- Aleksandar Berček, Niš, 2002.
- Bora Todorović, Niš, 2003.
- Čkalja, Belgrade, 2005.
- Miki Manojlović, Niš, 2006.
- Mira Stupica, Niš, 2009.

Collected articles

- Dinosaur Screwing (Tucanje dinosaura), Split, 1984.
- Paper Mirror (Ogledalo od hartije), Belgrade, 1998.
- 14.444 Days of a Critic (14.444 kritičarska dana), Belgrade, 2001, Niš

Television

- Double pass (Dupli pas), Belgrade, 2012. – coauthor Zorica Jevremović

Memories

- Film Friends (Filmski prijatelji), Novi Sad, 1997
- Film Enemies (Filmski neprijatelji), Novi Sad, 1999.

== Filmography (partial) ==
Director

- Traveling Theater (Putujući kino) (1964)

Screenwriter

- Traveling Theater (Putujući kino) (1964)
- Time of Vampires (Vrijeme vampira) (1971)
- Officer with Rose (Oficir s ružom) (1987)
- Pavle Vuisić (Pavle Vuisić) 1926–1988 (1997)
- Danilo Bata Stojković – Film Accomplishments (Danilo Bata Stojković – filmska ostvarenja) (1999)
- Dušica Žegarac – Film Accomplishments (Dušica Žegarac – filmska ostvarenja), (2000)
- Aleksandar Berček – Film Accomplishments (Aleksandar Berček – filmska ostvarenja), (2002)
- Bora Todorović – Film Accomplishments (Bora Todorović – filmska ostvarenja) (2003)

Night with stars – Veče sa zvezdama (complete author)

TV documentary series of 80 one-hour episodes dedicated to important Serbian actors and actresses. Production and broadcasting: TV Novi Sad 1990–1997.

1. Velimir Bata Živojinović, recorded 12. 4. 1988, broadcast 1990.
2. Dragomir Felba, 8. 2. 1990.
3. Dragan Nikolić, 21. 1. 1991.
4. Rahela Ferari, 23. 1. 1991.
5. Vladica Milosavljević, 12. 2. 1991.
6. Rade Marković, 23. 9. 1991.
7. Olivera Marković, 24. 9. 1991.
8. Bata Stojković, 22. 1. 1992.
9. Dragoljub Gula Milosavljević, 21. 6. 1992.
10. Mija Aleksić, 22. 6. 1992.
11. Mira Banjac, 23. 6. 1992.
12. Svetlana Bojković, 24. 6. 1992.
13. Slavko Štimac, 24. 6. 1992.
14. Ljuba Tadić, 25. 6. 1992.
15. Radmila Savićević, 25. 6. 1992.
16. Mića Tomić, 12. 7. 1992.
17. Olga Spiridonović, 22. 7. 1992.
18. Mira Stupica, 24. 7. 1992.
19. Bata Paskaljević, 7. 9. 1992.
20. Ružica Sokić, 5. 10. 1992.
21. Žiža Stojanović, 6. 10. 1992.
22. Branka Veselinović, 6. 10. 1992.
23. Milena Dravić, 7. 10. 1992.
24. Mirjana Karanović, 12. 10. 1992.
25. Petar Kralj, 13. 10. 1992.
26. Žika Milenković, 13. 10. 1992.
27. Miodrag Krivokapić, 13. 10. 1992.
28. Dušan Janićijević, 20. 11. 1992.
29. Branko Pleša, 4. 4. 1993.
30. Jelisaveta Seka Sablić ,7. 4. 1993.
31. Predrag Pepi Laković, 8. 4. 1993.
32. Radmila Živković, 9. 4. 1993.
33. Marija Crnobori, 5. 7. 1993.
34. Stevan Šalajić, 15. 9. 1993.
35. Velimir Bata Životić, 15. 9. 1993.
36. Zorica Jovanović, 19. 10. 1993.
37. Tatjana Beljakova, 20. 10. 1993.
38. Stevo Žigon, 20. 10. 1993.
39. Janez Vrhovec, 21. 10. 1993.
40. Ksenija Jovanović, 4. 11. 1993.
41. Bogdan Diklić, 5. 11. 1993.
42. Miodrag Petrović Čkalja, 5. 11. 1993.
43. Eva Ras, 6. 11. 1993.
44. Ivan Hajtl, 1. 3. 1994.
45. Olga Ivanović, 8. 3. 1994.
46. Mira Nikolić, 8. 3. 1994.
47. Miodrag Mrgud Radovanović, 9. 3. 1994.
48. Radmila Andrić, 9. 3. 1994.
49. Dragan Maksimović, 10. 3. 1994.
50. Ibi Romhanji, 24. 5. 1994.
51. Milica Radaković, 24. 5. 1994.
52. Gorica Popović, 31. 5. 1994.
53. Bora Todorović, 1. 6. 1994.
54. Aleksandar Berček, 30. 6. 1994.
55. Petar Slovenski, 25. 10. 1994.
56. Duško Bulajić, 26. 10. 1994.
57. Gizela Vuković, 26. 10. 1994.
58. Merima Isaković, 27. 10. 1994.
59. Dara Čalenić, 17. 10. 1995.
60. Boro Stjepanović, 2. 11. 1995.
61. Stanislava Pešić, 5. 1. 1996.
62. Tamara Miletić, 6. 1. 1996.
63. Vasa Pantelić, 7. 1. 1996.
64. Sonja Savić, 6. 3. 1996.
65. Predrag Ejdus, 6. 3. 1996.
66. Bosiljka Boci, 7. 3. 1996.
67. Slavka i Branislav Jerinić, 7. 3. 1996.
68. Aljoša Vučković, 29. 4 1996.
69. Ljubiša Bačić i Milutin Butković, 29. 4. 1996.
70. Tatjana Lukjanova, 17. 5. 1996.
71. Dara Džokić, 21. 5. 1996.
72. Pavle Minčić, 21. 5. 1996.
73. Mihajlo Miša Janketić, 21. 5. 1996.
74. Radmila Rada Đuričin, 12. 6. 1996.
75. Petar Banićević, 12. 6. 1996.
76. Branislav Lečić, 13. 6. 1996.
77. Branka Petrić, 21. 6. 1996.
78. Slavko Simić, 9. 7. 1996.
79. Mirjana Joković, 4. 10. 1996.
80. Lidija Stevanović, 24. 3. 1997.
