= Borka Pavićević =

Serbiab dramaturge, columnist, activist

Borka Pavićević Борка Павићевић
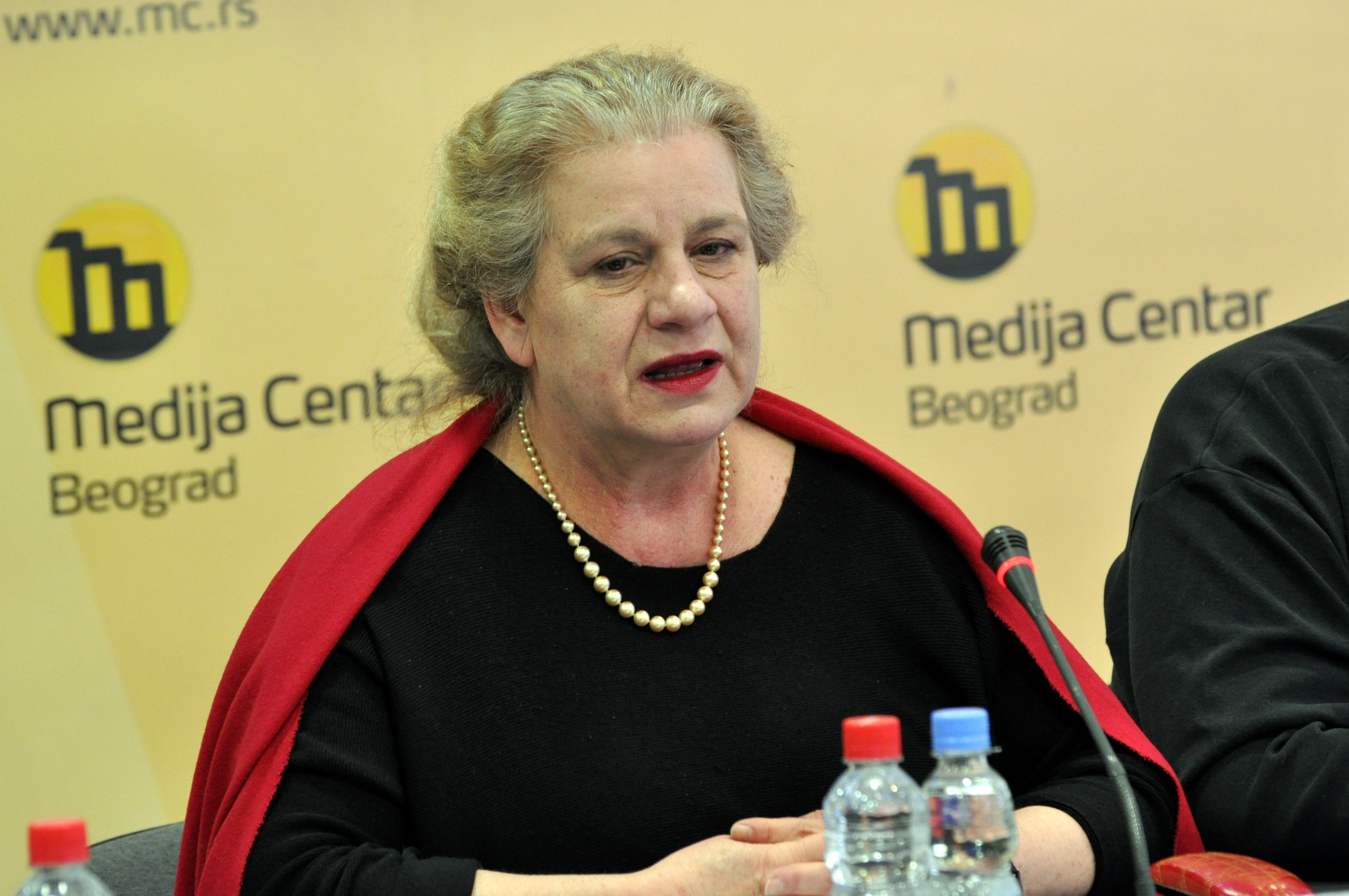
- Born: June 5, 1947; Kotor, Yugoslavia
- Died: 30 June 2019 (aged 72); Belgrade, Serbia
- Education: University of Arts in Belgrade
- Organization: CZKD (1994–2019)
- Political party: PSG (2017–2019)

Borka Pavićević (Serbo-Croatian Cyrillic: Борка Павићевић; 5 June 1947 – 30 June 2019) was a Serbian dramaturge, columnist, and cultural activist. She was also described as a "dramatist, Belgrade liberal and pacifist intellectual". She founded the Centre for Cultural Decontamination in 1994, and was a co-founder of the Belgrade Circle.

== Biography ==
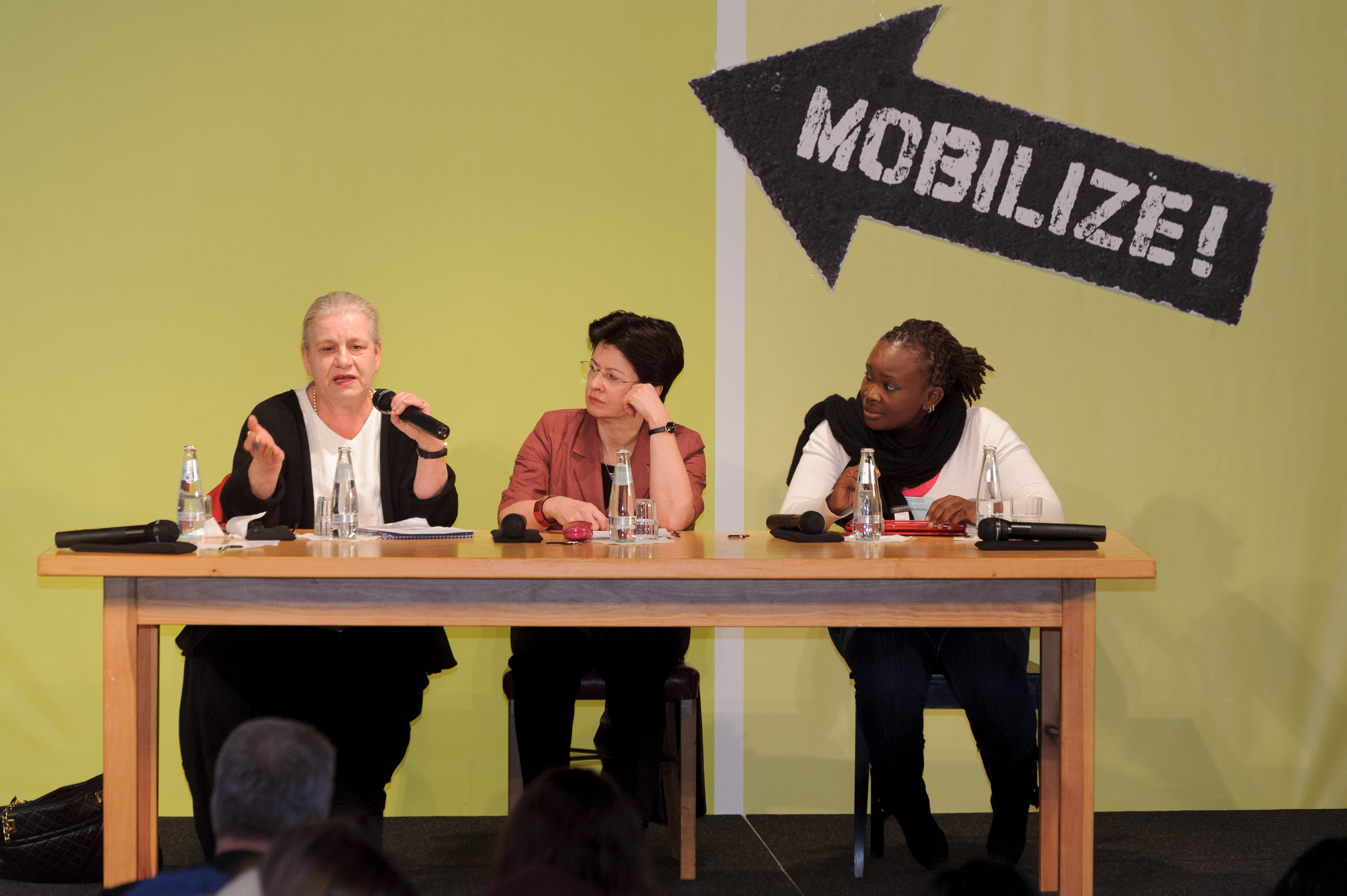
Generations of Activists panel at Heinrich Böll Foundation conf. MOBILIZE!, 2013

Born in Kotor, Pavićević was a 1971 graduate from Belgrade's Academy of Theatre, Film, Radio and Television. Her theatre career spanned decades. For ten years, Pavicevic was a dramaturge at Atelje 212. She founded the "New Sensibility" Theater in a Belgrade brewery in 1981. From 1984 to 1991, she participated in the artistic movement "KPGT" (Kazaliste Pozoriste Gledalisce Teatar). She was a playwright and the artistic director of the Belgrade Drama Theatre, until she was let go in 1993 due to her political views. She also served as a jurist for the Belgrade International Theatre Festival, working for the organization for 20 years. A co-founder of the Belgrade Circle, she was a regular newspaper columnist in "Danas".

Pavićević founded the Centre for Cultural Decontamination (CZKD), devoted to the creation of catharsis, in 1994; it has organised more than 5,000 events, exhibitions, protests, and lectures. She was one of the signers of the Declaration of The Civil Resistance Movement in 2012 and was the co-author of the book Belgrade, my Belgrade. In 2017, she signed the Declaration on the Common Language of the Croats, Serbs, Bosniaks and Montenegrins. Pavičević received many awards including, the Otto Rene Castillo Award for Political Theater (2000); the Hiroshima Foundation Prize for Peace and Culture (2004); the Osvajanje slobode (“Winning Freedom”) prize by the Maja Maršićević Tasić Foundation (2005); Routes Award by European Cultural Foundation (2009/2010); and, from the Government of the Republic of France, the Legion of Honour (2001).

She was married to human rights lawyer Nikola Barović.

Borka Pavićević died on 30 June 2019 in Belgrade, at the age of 72.
