= Women's World (Serbian magazine) =

Serbian women's magazine

Women's World (Ženski svet) was a Serbian monthly woman's magazine that was published in Novi Sad from 1886 to 1914.

Women's World was published by the Serbian Women's Charitable Cooperative, a humanitarian women's organization founded in 1873. The magazine was edited by Arkadiie Varadanin (1844-1922), a headmaster active in encouraging women's education.

Varadanin encouraged women to write, and published some of their work in Women's World. Much of the magazine's contents, however, were provided by male contributors. "Subtitled 'Women's matters and fashion' its contents were, like so many similar publications, designed to keep women firmly within that world."
