= Maša Stokić =

Maša Stokić (née Jeremic), born in Belgrade, Serbia, in 1966 is a dramatist and drama critic. She has a BA in drama from the Academy of Dramatic Arts in Belgrade. She has been a drama critic since 1989, is a member of the IATC (International Association of Theatre Critic) and has won several prizes for her criticism in several different media, including the Sterija Award (1996)), Serbia's most prestigious theatre award.

Stokić is one of the founders of the theatrical newspaper Ludus, which helped Serbian theatre to survive during the chaotic last decade of twentieth century. She collaborated as a dramaturge on dozens of productions in Serbian theatres. All of her adaptations have been played by professional companies in Serbia. In 2001, she won another Sterija award for her adaptation of Borislav Pekić's novel "The Golden Fleece". She wrote several original plays, some of which were produced by theatres in Zrenjanin and Kragujevac. After the democratic changes in Serbia she became the general manager and artistic director of the Duško Radović Little Theater in Belgrade (2000–2002). She is an artistic associate and publication editor of the Belgrade Drama Theatre (2003–2009).

At the moment she's a chief editor of LUDUS Serbian theatre newspapers (started 2012.) and drama editor in Belgrade drama theatre (2013.). She has founded LUDUS ONLINE - first e-news in Serbia specialised for theatre events (http://www.udus.org.rs/ludus_online.html)
