= Ana Tasić =

Serbian theatre critic and researcher (born 1978)

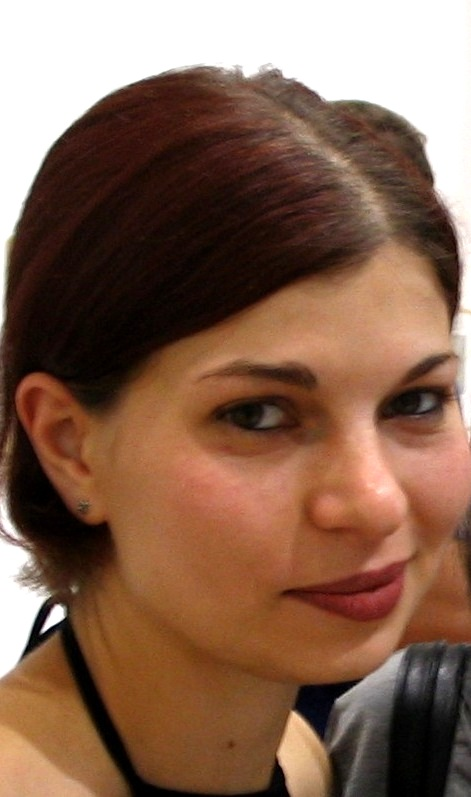
- Tasić in 2005
- Born: 1978 (age 47–48); Belgrade, SR Serbia, SFR Yugoslavia
- Occupations: Theatre critic and researcher

Ana Tasić (Serbian Cyrillic: Ана Тасић; born 1978) is a Serbian theatre critic and researcher. Since July 2005 she has been writing theatre critiques for the daily newspaper Politika, based in Belgrade.

== Biography ==
Tasić earned her BA degree from the Faculty of Dramatic Arts in Belgrade in 2002 (at the department of theatre and radio production). She earned her MA in Theatrology from the same faculty in 2008 (with the topic “The treatment of the body/corporality in the ‘new brutal’ drama and theatre”, under mentor Prof. Aleksandra Jovićević). Her MA thesis was published as a book – titled Open Wounds/Body and Physicality in New Brutal Drama and Theatre – by Fakultet dramskih umetnosti and Čigoja štampa in 2009.

She earned her PhD degree in Theatrology in 2012. The title of her dissertation was The Influence and Use of Electronic Media in Postdramatic Theatre (Faculty of Dramatic Arts in Belgrade, mentor Prof. Aleksandra Jovićević, PhD).

As an undergraduate student she worked as a journalist, anchor and musical collaborator at radio-stations 2002 and City. She also worked in the National Theatre in Belgrade as a project organiser, collaborator on projects at the Institute for Theatre, Film, Radio and TV at the Faculty of Dramatic Arts and has participated at international conferences in the area of theatrology and culture management (in Moscow, Aberystwyth and Cambridge, among others). After completing her bachelor's degree, she wrote about theatre for the newspaper Ludus, magazines Teatron and Scena, as well as doing film critiques for Blicnews, the film department of the Serbian National TV and Film Centre of Serbia.

She has participated in many international conferences in the field of theatrology and cultural management (London 2011, Belgrade 2009, Novi Sad 2009, Cambridge 2000, Moscow 1997), appeared as a moderator and participant at many round tables and panel discussions related to various aspects of theatrical practice and as a jury member in many theatre festivals.

She was a member of the jury of the 4th International Theatre Festival TIBA in Belgrade (2006), the president of the expert jury for prize awards of the theatre Duško Radović (2006), member of the jury of Politika at BITEF, which awards the prize for best director (2006–2011), member of the critique jury at the 12th Festival of Choreographic Miniatures (2008), president of the jury of The Actors Award Raša Plaović (2009), president of the jury of the 60th Festival of professional theatres in Vojvodina (city of Zrenjanin, 2010) etc. She attended workshops for experienced theatre critics, held in London in January 2011 and in Prague in June 2011 (organized by SPACE, organization for Supporting Performing Arts Circulation in Europe). She is the selector of Serbian theater festivals Days of Comedy in Jagodina (2007–2012), and the festival of Best Theatre Performances from Vojvodina (2011–2012). She was the selector of the Showcase program at the 42. BITEF - Belgrade International Theatre Festival (2008), selector of the theatre festival Sterijino pozorje in Novi Sad (2010), for the main programme - selection of national drama.

From October 2005 to October 2011 she was working at the Faculty of Dramatic Arts in Belgrade, part-time, as teaching assistant, for the course "History of world drama and theatre". Since October 2008 she has been a member of editorial of theatre magazine Ludus. Since June 2008 she has been the part of the team of drama researchers on the projects of Serbian Ministry of Science and Education. She is an honourable member of the Urban Book Circle in Canada.
