= Jelisaveta Marković =

Serbian translator

Jelisaveta Marković (Belgrade, Serbia, 6 April 1876 – Belgrade, Serbia, Yugoslavia, 7 April 1966) was a Serbian translator. She translated several foreign writers from English, French, Latin and Norwegian into Serbian.

== Biography ==
She finished primary and higher women's school (1883–1893) in Belgrade. She worked as a teacher in Belgrade (1893–1897, 1903–1904), Niš (1897–1998) and Kragujevac (1904–1912), teacher and principal of the Women's Grande école in Thessaloniki from 1898 to 1903 and teacher at the Women's Grande école and Trade Academy in Belgrade from 1912 to 1914. From 1914 to 1919, she took early retirement, but after the end of World War I, she returned to teaching from 1919 to 1925. She was fluent in French and German. She was one of the founders of the Association of Literary Translators of Serbia.

== Translation work ==
She first appeared as a translator in 1898. She translated a large number of works from French, English, Latin and Norwegian, most of which have experienced multiple editions. She accompanied some of her translations with prefaces. Among her most significant translations are the works of:

- William Thackeray: The History of Henry Esmond, Belgrade, SKZ, 1922; Vanity Fair, Belgrade, 1969;
- Honoré de Balzac's Cousin Bette, published in "Narodna prosveta", 1934;Čiča Gorio (Père Goriot), Belgrade, Narodna prosveta, 1934; Seljaci, Belgrade, Narodna prosveta, 1936; Lost Illusions, Belgrade, Kultura, 1948,
- Anatole France's Penguin Island, Belgrade, Kultura, 1946;Little Pierre, Belgrade, Nove generacije, 1950; Life in Flower, Belgrade, Nove generacije, 1951;
- Stendhal's novella Vittoria Accoramboni, Belgrade, Prosveta, 1950;
- Mark Twain's Huckleberry Finn, Belgrade, New Generation, 1947;
- Thornton Wilder's The Bridge of San Luis Rey, Belgrade, Prosveta, 1951;
- Sigrid Undset's Kristin Lavransdatter, Belgrade, Prosveta, 1961;
- Maupassant's Moonlight;
- George Eliot's Silas Marner; and
- Thomas à Kempis's The Imitation of Christ, published in Belgrade by Državna štamparija Kraljevine Srba, Hrvata i Slovenaca (State Printing House of the Kingdom of Serbs, Croats and Slovenes), 1926.

For the National Theatre in Belgrade she translated the play Conflict by Pierre Breton, 1910, and for the Youth Cultural and Artistic Association "Ivo Lola Ribar", Our Town by Thornton Wilder, 1956, which was also performed at the Serbian National Theatre in 1971.

The French government awarded her the Academic Palms and the title of Officier d'Académie in 1922. She was awarded the Order of St. Sava in 1926. For her translation work, she was on the "List of Winners of the 7th of July Award" in 1956 and 1962. She also received the "October Award" of the City of Belgrade for the best translation achievement for the novel "Kristina Lavransova" by Sigrid Undset.

She also wrote the book Méthode de lecture française pour les élèves serbes (Belgrade, 1923).

== Sources ==
- "Translator Jelisaveta Marković celebrated the 45th anniversary of her work", Politika, 17 January 1953.
- Stojanović, "Jelisaveta Marković", Politika, 8 March 1959.
- B. Popović, "Visiting Jelisaveta Marković", NIN, 8 November 1959
- L. J. Sabljić, "Conversation with the winner of the October Award J. Marković ", Borba, 11 November 1962.
- A. S. Petrović, "Posle jedne nagrade", Politika, 2 December 1962.
- Stojanović, "Jelisaveta Marković", "Collection of Papers on Translation", Belgrade, 1966, p. 92-95.
- Z. P. Jovanović, "Bibliography of the translation of Jelisaveta Marković", "Collection of works on translation", Belgrade, 1966, p. 96-99.

== See also ==
- List of Serbian women writers
