= Annie Christitch =

Serbian patriot and journalist

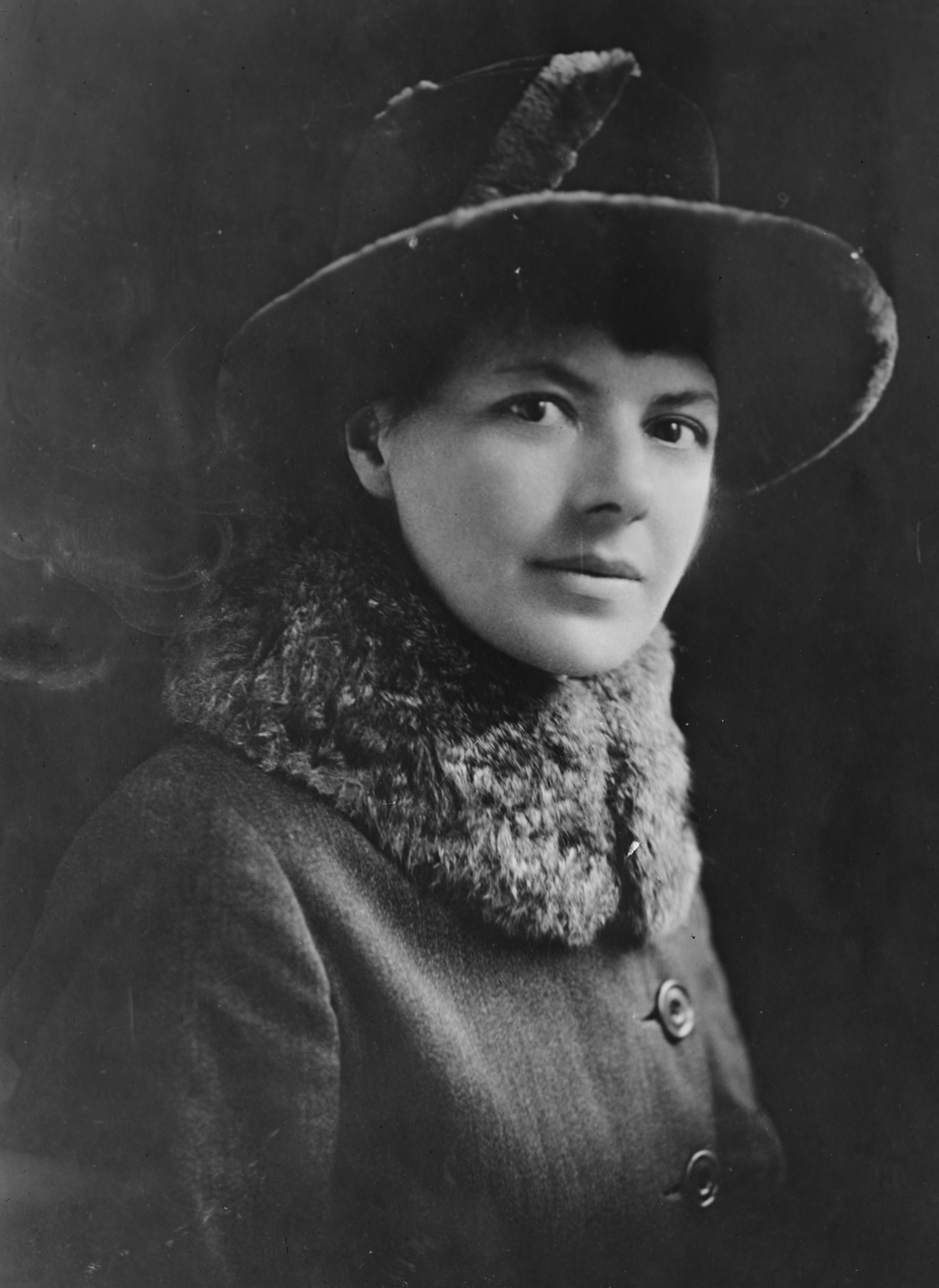
- Born: 1885; Belgrade
- Died: 1977 (aged 91–92); London
- Relatives: Elizabeth Christitch (mother)

Annie Christitch (1885 – 1977) was a Serbian journalist, patriot and women's rights activist.

== Early life and education ==
Annie Christitch was born to Elizabeth O'Brien and Colonel Ljubomir N. Christitch (also written Hristić) in Belgrade in 1885. Christitch was mostly educated at home with her sister Janie and brother Nikola. Having left Belgrade on 30 may 1904, she matriculated and entered London University in October 1904. In 1905, she was joined at London University by her sister, Janie, who joined the Benedictine Nuns at Tyburn in 1909 and was professed in 1911. Annie Christitch was conferred with the degree of Bachelor of Arts in 1909. She spoke English, French, Italian, German, Serbian, Croatian, Russian, and Irish fluently.

== Career ==
She worked as lady-in-waiting to Queen Maria of Yugoslavia. Along with her mother, Christitch worked as a nurse during the First World War. She treated Serbian soldiers and supervised several military hospitals. Christitch raised money for medical supplies with a lecture tour in Britain and ran a soup kitchen for the Red Cross. During the Second World War, Christitch was part of an underground to help allied soldiers escape from Balkan countries. She also worked with the British Red Cross supported by the Queen to supply Yugoslav prisoners of war held in Germany and Italy.

Christitch was also a journalist and reported for the Daily Express. She was one of the first female reporters to report using an airplane. Christitch worked to improve the rights of women in the Balkans and was a founding member of the Catholic Women's Suffrage Society. She was given a papal blessing for her work by Pope Benedict XV in 1919. Christitch served on the Press Committee of the International Council of Women from 1838 to 1947. Christitch died in London in 1977.

== Awards ==
Christitch was awarded the Order of the White Eagle, the Order of St. Sava, The Yugoslavian Red Cross medal and the Czechoslovak White Lion.
