= Zorica Jevremović =

Serbian theatre and video director (1948–2023)

Zorica Jevremović Зорица Јевремовић
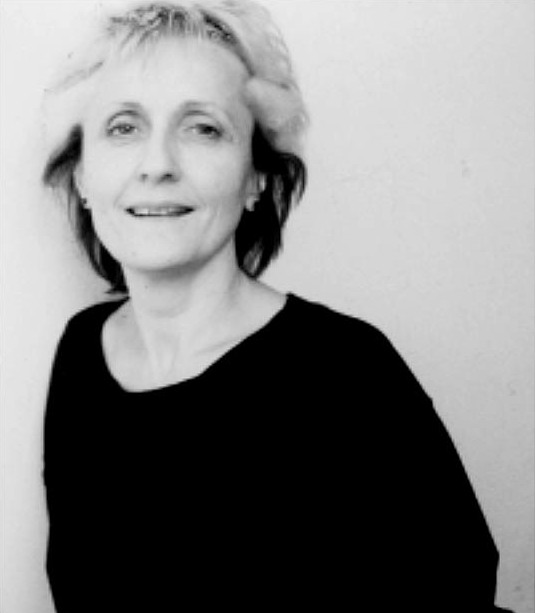
- Jevremović in 2002
- Born: Zorica Jevremović; 22 August 1948; Ražanj, PR Serbia, FPR Yugoslavia
- Died: 5 October 2023 (aged 75); Belgrade, Serbia
- Education: Faculty of Dramatic Arts in Belgrade (1975)
- Occupations: Theatre and video director, playwright, theorist, literary historian
- Years active: 1968–2023
- Spouse: Ranko Munitić (1943–2009)

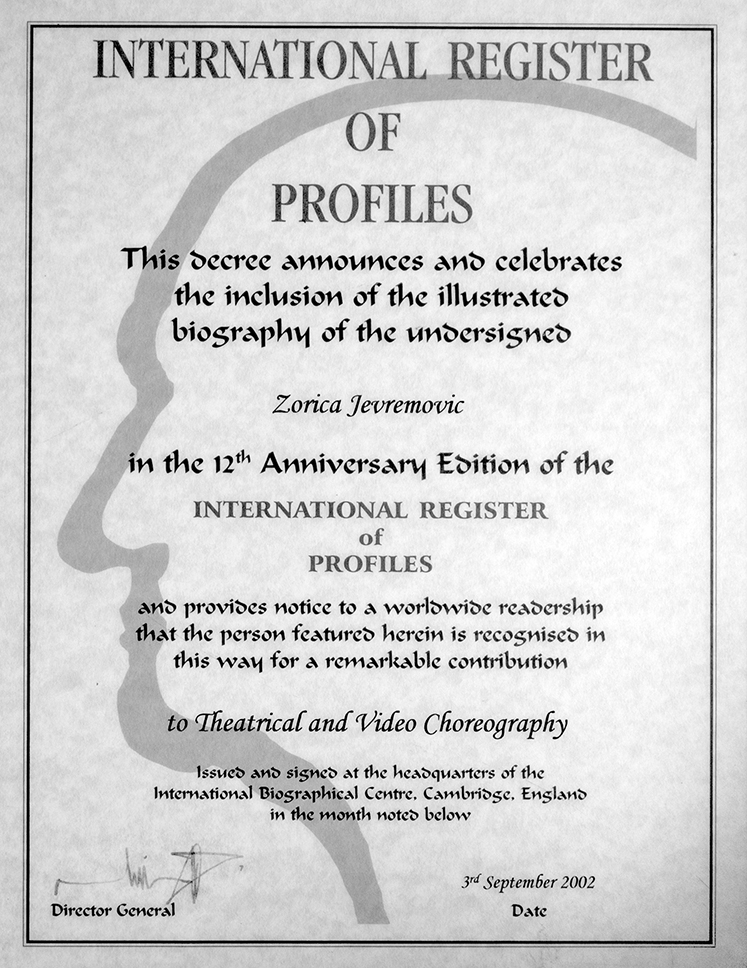
International Biographical Centre, Cambridge, England, remarkable contribution to Theatrical and Video Choreography, 2002

Zorica Jevremović (Jevremović-Munitić; Serbo-Croatian Cyrillic: Зорица Јевремовић, Serbo-Croatian pronunciation: [zôritsa jeʋrěːmoʋitɕ mǔnititɕ]; 22 August 1948 – 5 October 2023) was a Serbian theatre and video director, playwright, choreographer, intermedia theorist, literary historian and feminist. Her work also included that of a dramaturge in alternative and informal theatrical and film groups.

Jevremović was director of the Belgrade Centre for Media "Ranko Munitić" and the editor of a regional journal for media and culture Mediantrop.

Her husband was a prominent Yugoslav cultural worker and media theorist Ranko Munitić.

== Biography ==
Jevremović Munitić was born in post-war circumstances in Ražanj, but she was raised and grew up in Belgrade.

Jevremović met Ranko Munitić at the amateur film festival "Mala Pula", on 24 June 1968. The two of them married in Belgrade on 1 May 1971, where Zorica added the surname Munitić to hers, and then they went to Zagreb. In November of the same year, they returned to Belgrade, where they lived together until the end of March 2009 (when Munitić died).

Jevremović obtained her dramaturgy degree in 1975 at the Faculty of Dramatic Arts in Belgrade.

As an advocate of a common Yugoslav cultural milieu she had undertaken research into the cultural history and theological common law in multinational and multiconfessional regions of Croatia, Slovenia and Kosovo within former Yugoslavia: Dubrovnik (1976–1980), Perast (1981), Dečani (1985–1989), Tacen (1982–1985), Povlja (1985), Poljica (1986–1990), Zjum (1990).

Jevremović was active as a dramaturge in the following key alternative and informal theatre and film groups in former Yugoslavia: KPGT (1980–1990), Art-film (1981–1983), Nova osećajnost (1984–1985), Preduzeće za pozorišne poslove (1992).

Jevremović edited the following alternative research collections focused on literary history and published in “Književnost” journal: Sava Mrkalj (1984), St. Sava and Hilandar (1988), Vatroslav Jagić (1990).

Jevremović also founded alternative theatres that operated as 'neighbourhood theatres' in ghettoized communities, in places with no previous history of theatre performances:

1985: "Performative Children's Street Theater" („Performativno ulično dečije pozorište”) in Skadarlija, the bohemian artists' venue teeming with restaurants in downtown Belgrade. The core of the troupe was made up of Romani children who lived in Skadarlija, 'white' children' from Dorćol (a nearby prestigious Belgrade neighbourhood), Romani children from the favelas of the Belgrade suburb of Mirijevo (who sell flowers in Skadarlija stolen in city cemeteries), professional actors and painters who live in Skadarlija, a Skadarlija fortune-teller, clowns, fire eaters, and alternative artists (musicians, painters).

1993–1995: "Pocket Theatre M" („Džepno pozorište M”) on the premises of the "Dr Laza Lazarevic" Psychiatric Clinic. The core of this troupe was made up of convalescents, children from the vicinity of the hospital, professional actors, children of the hospital therapists and psychiatrists, film and television amateur actors, psychologists, models, public figures, and blind persons.

1997–1999: "WAY 5a" („PUT 5a”), Feminist theatre in an apartment occupied by Autonomous Women's Center Against Sexual Violence. The core of this troupe was made up of women who came to the Center for Help, Center activists, ballet dancers, painters, women who lived in the same building, women in wheelchairs, composers, students of Women’s Studies, and women refugees.

Zorica Jevremović had worked with marginal groups: Romani children, nuns, psychotics, disabled, blind persons, women who have suffered violence, parentless children, lesbians and women refugees.

At the beginning of the 1990s wars in former Yugoslavia, she was an active member of two anti-war groups: “Civilni pokret otpora” (The Civil Movement for Peace) and “Beogradski krug” (Belgrade Circle), in the framework of which she undertook a number of social-cultural projects.

Jevremović also published books on multimedia theory and applied theatre and several books of plays.

Her video works have been shown at the following festivals: “Video Medeja” in Novi Sad, Serbia; Superfest International Disability Film Festival in San Francisco, US; “Alternative - festival film/video” in Belgrade, Serbia, “Bitef polifonija” and the Serbian TV RTS programme “Trezor”, as well as numerous university centres around the world.

Jevremović was a member of the Union of Performing Artists of Serbia from 1978. From 2007, she was also a Serbian Writers’ Society member.

Zorica Jevremović died on 5 October 2023, at the age of 75.

== Selected works ==
Books

- System Breakdown /Raspad sistema/, „Aurora“, Belgrade, 2000.
- Semiotic Circles /Semiološki krugovi/, „Prometej“, Novi Sad, 2001.
- Four Pre-war Plays /Četiri predratne drame/, „Prometej“, Novi Sad, 2001, ISBN 86-7639-543-8; 2nd extended edition 2006, ISBN 86-515-0016-5
- Music Videos of Nostalgia /Spotovi nostalgije/, Radio-televizija Srbije, Belgrade 2006. ISBN 86-81733-39-7
- The Ballad of the Maiden Dress /Balada o devojačkom odelu/, „Dosije“, Belgrade, 2006. ISBN 86-909635-0-2
- Theatre as the Making of the World /Pozorište kao stvaranje sveta/, Institut za pozorište, film, radio i televiziju, Belgrade, 2008. ISBN 978-86-82101-36-9
- A Double Pass/Dupli pas/, co-writer Ranko Munitić, Radio-Televizija Srbije, Belgrade, 2012. ISBN 978-86-6195-014-8
- Silence, Departed Ladies/Tišina, pomrlice, Centar za medije „Ranko Munitić“, Beograd, 2017.

Theatrical plays

- At the Station /Na stanici/, 1968
- Oh, Serbia, Nowhere to Hide from the Sun /Oj, Srbi’o, nigde lada nema/, 1971
- A Werewolf from Samaria /Vukodlak iz Samarije/, 1973
- Bastard 1948-1968 /Kopile 1948-1968/, 1987
- Fiodor’s Girl /Fjodorova devojčica/, 1991
- Fairy Tale blues /Bajka bluz/, 1994.
- A Journey into the Impossible or The Pursuit of Goddess Clio /Put u nemoguće ili potraga za boginjom Klio/, 1995
- Whispering Girls I /Šaputave devojke I/, 1997
- Whispering Girls II /Šaputave devojke II/, 1999
- The Ballad of the Maiden Dress /Balada o devojačkom odelu/, 2004
- Pomrlice (tri umiranja i jedan san), 2017.

Essays and Studies in periodicals

- „Total Comic Strips Art /Totalni strip/“, Kultura, 1975.
- „Confessions of a monastic school pupil to Holy King Stephen of Dečani in April 1941 /Ispovesti đaka monaške škole Svetom kralju Dečanskom aprila 1941/“, Kultura, 1991.
- „Theatrical political factories /Pozorišne političke fabrike/“, Republika, br. 468-469, Belgrade, 1-31. January 2010.

Editing of scientific collections

- Sava Mrkalj, Književnost journal, Belgrade, 1984.
- St. Sava and Hilandar, Književnost, 1988.
- Vatroslav Jagić, Književnost, 1990.

Video works

- Autovideography /Autovideografija/ (1996)
- Whispering Girls /Šaputave devojke/ (2001)
- Whispering Girls II /Šaputave devojke II/ (2003)
- Waiting /Iščekivanje/ (2004)
- Queen of the Night /Kraljica noći/ (2005)
- Pocket Theatre M Promotion /Promocija Džepnog pozorišta M/ (2005)
- Bosnia 92 – Human Traces /Bosna 92 – ljudski tragovi/ (2005)
- Left Over Film Reels /Ostaci filmske trake/ (2005)

== See also ==
- List of peace activists

== Literature ==
- Jevremović, Zorica. „Pozorište kvarta - elementi jedne biografije : (auto)portret Zorice Jevremović kroz ispovest sačinjenu od mnoštva putovanja, ali uvek na istom tragu“, priredio Aleksandar Milosavljević, Scena, god. 38, br. 2 (2002), pp. 49–54
- „Svako liči na ono što jeste: Zorica Jevremović, dramski pisac“ / razgovarala Branka Krilović, Scena, god. 38, br. 2 (2002), pp. 37–48.
- Bekčić, Gordana. „Osuđene na pozorišno nepostojanje: Zorica Jevremović: Četiri predratne drame, Prometej, Novi Sad 2001.“, Scena, god. 39, br. 1/2 (januar-April 2003.), pp. 112–113.
- Milosavljević, Aleksandar „Nesporazumi sa dušom: beleška o (nekim) dramama Zorice Jevremović“, in: Četiri predratne drame / Zorica Jevremović, 2006, pp. 5–8.
- Dragićević-Šešić, Milena. „Interkulturna medijacija - delovati različito u vremenu plime jednoumlja“, originally published as foreword in: Balada o devojačkom odelu / Zorica Jevremović, 2006, pp. 110–126
- Dragićević-Šešić, Milena. „Teatralizacija istorije ili put u budućnost: dramsko delo Zorice Jevremović“, originally published in: Kultura, Knj. 124 (2009), Beograd, pp. 209–220.
