= Ruvarac =

Ruvarac (Serbian Cyrillic: Руварац) is a Serbian surname and family. It may refer to:

- Ilarion Ruvarac (1832–1905), Orthodox priest and historian
- Dimitrije Ruvarac (1842–1931), Orthodox priest, politician and historian
- Kosta Ruvarac (1837–1864), writer and literary critic.
