= Grčić (surname) =

Grčić (Serbian Cyrillic: Грчић) is a South Slavic patronymic surname. It is derived from the word Grk, meaning "Greek".

Notable people with the surname include:

- Albina Grčić (born 1999), Croatian singer
- Branko Grčić, Croatian politician and economist
- Ivan Filipović Grčić
- Jovan Grčić Milenko, Serbian poet, writer and physician
- Konstantin Grcic (born 1965), German industrial designer
- Lenko Grčić, Croatian footballer and coach
- Manojlo Grčić
- Nikodim Grčić, Orthodox Christian monk
- Tomislav Grčić (born 1986), Croatian footballer

== See also ==
- Grčinić
- Grković
- Jakov Gerčić (1788–1851), Serbian historian and educator
