= Miodrag Radulovacki =

Serbian American scientist (1933–2014)

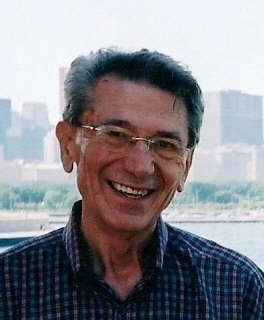
- Born: 28 April 1933; Parage, Kingdom of Yugoslavia
- Died: 27 May 2014 (aged 81); Belgrade, Serbia
- Education: Karlovci High School, Serbia
- Alma mater: Medical Faculty, University of Belgrade, Serbia, (MD), (Ph.D.)
- Known for: Adenosine Sleep Theory, 1984; Pharmacological Approaches in the Treatment of Sleep Apnea; Yugoslav Student Summer Program at the University of Illinois at Chicago and Champaign-Urbana, 1990-2000; The Miodrag Radulovacki Family Prize for Excellence in Basic Sciences at the UIC College of Medicine, 2005
- Awards: Inventor of the Year Award, 2010, College of Medicine at the University of Illinois at Chicago; Foreign Member of the Serbian Academy of Sciences and Arts, 2003, Belgrade, Serbia
- Scientific career
- Fields: Neuropharmacology, Sleep and sleep disorders, Sleep-related breathing disorders
- Workplaces: University of Belgrade, Serbia; UCLA – Brain Research Institute, 1964-1965; University of Khartoum, Sudan, 1967-1970; College of Medicine at the University of Illinois at Chicago (UIC), 1970 - 2014

Miodrag (Misha) Radulovacki (Serbian: Миодраг Радуловачки, Miodrag Radulovački), was a Serbian American scientist and inventor. He was professor of pharmacology in the College of Medicine at the University of Illinois at Chicago (UIC), Radulovacki's research accomplishments include: (1) the Adenosine Sleep Theory, and (2) pioneering pharmacological studies for the treatment of sleep apnea, together with research collaborator, David W. Carley, (professor of medicine at the UIC). Radulovacki and Carley invented several drug therapies for the treatment of sleep apnea which have been patented by the UIC. The UIC recognized them as the 2010 "Inventors of the Year." Radulovacki published more than 170 scientific papers. Radulovacki was also a Foreign Member of the Serbian Academy of Sciences and Arts.

== Early life ==
Miodrag Radulovacki was born on April 28, 1933, in Parage, a village in northwestern Serbia. Both of his parents were elementary school teachers. At the beginning of World War II, Radulovacki's father was drafted into the Yugoslav Army and was later taken prisoner by the invading Germans.

In 1943, Radulovacki moved to Sremski Karlovci after his mother accepted a teaching position in the town. Sremski Karlovci (also known as Karlovci), a baroque Serbian town on the banks of the Danube River, had been home to the Radulovacki family for over 200 years. Radulovacki attended Karlovci High School or "Gymnasium," which is the oldest high school in Serbia. Radulovacki called Karlovci Gymnasium the "Serbian Cambridge and Oxford". Radulovacki graduated as valedictorian of the Karlovci High School Class of 1951. Radulovacki gained admission to the University of Belgrade School of Medicine.

== Education and scientific career ==
Radulovacki graduated from the University of Belgrade School of Medicine in 1959. He went on to obtain a PhD in Neurophysiology. The topic of his PhD thesis was: "Sleep in Split-Brain Cats," partly done at the Brain Research Institute at UCLA.

Radulovacki spent 18 months at the University of California, Los Angeles (UCLA) Brain Research Institute where his mentor was Ross Adey. One of the findings of his research at UCLA was that the electroencephalographic (EEG) pattern of sleep in cats with split brain to the pons is synchronous in both brain hemispheres, indicating the importance of the brainstem in sleep regulation.

In 1966, Radulovacki accepted a teaching position with the Physiology Department in the College of Medicine at the University of Khartoum, Sudan. There he invented an approach for obtaining cerebrospinal fluid using a cannula to the cisterna magna in the brain of cats. The cannulation method enabled researchers to obtain cerebrospinal fluid during sleep and wakefulness for the analysis of monoamine metabolites. This approach was of interest since Michel Jouvet's Monoamine Theory of Sleep, with serotonin as the sleep inducing agent, was dominant at the time. From 1970 to 1984, at the University of Illinois, Radulovacki published a series of papers dealing with the role of monoamines in sleep.

In 1970, Radulovacki was recruited by Klaus Unna to join the Department of Pharmacology in the College of Medicine at the University of Illinois at Chicago as an assistant professor. Radulovacki published more than 170 scientific papers during his career at the UIC.

== Scientific achievements ==
=== Adenosine Sleep Theory ===
In 1984, Radulovacki postulated the Adenosine Sleep Theory, (JPET, 228: 268-274, 1984). The idea for adenosine's role in sleep occurred to him after reading a paper by Sol Snyder's group (Proc. Natl. Acad. Sci, 78: 3260-64, 1981) about the importance of adenosine receptors in the behavioral actions of methylxanthines. In the article, the authors correlated the behavioral excitation produced by theophylline in micromolar concentrations with the blockade of adenosine receptors.

Radulovacki reasoned that if the blocking of adenosine receptors produces excitation, then perhaps stimulation of the same receptors could induce sleep. He knew that experiments by John Phillis and his group (Can. J. Physiol. Pharmacol. 57:1289-1312, 1979), which utilized an iontophoretic application of adenosine in the brain, had demonstrated adenosine's depressant effect on the responses of neurons in several brain regions and that the general neurophysiological effects of adenosine were shown to be inhibitory. In addition, the preliminary experiments in dogs by Haulica et al. (J. Neurochem. 21:,1019–20, 1973) and the administration of adenosine into the brains of rats, cats and fowl suggested that adenosine was able to produce behavioral sleep. The explanation of adenosine's hypnotic effect was through its interaction with serotonin, widely believed to be a sleep inducing agent. However, since there was no suggestion how this adenosine-serotonin link was achieved, experiments highlighting the potential role of adenosine in sleep had largely been forgotten.

=== Research collaboration with David W. Carley ===
In 1993, Radulovacki started a collaboration with David W. Carley, a professor of medicine, bioengineering and pharmacology at the UIC. Their research efforts focused on developing pharmacological approaches for the treatment of sleep apnea. Since there were no medicines to alleviate this condition, Radulovacki and Carley set out to develop a drug treatment. Their initial work focussed on an experimental model of sleep apnea in rats, initially testing the effects of adenosine compounds. Eventually, they obtained positive results using serotonin and other compounds. As a result, the UIC patented their discoveries, obtaining numerous US and international patents.

Patents for sleep and sleep-related disorders include:

1. "Hypnotic Composition and Method of Inducing Sleep"; Inventor: Miodrag Radulovacki, US Patent 4537907, August 27, 1985. (This patent was issued to UIC before Radulovacki started his collaboration with Carley in 1993).
2. "Pharmacological Treatment for Sleep Apnea"; Inventors: Miodrag Radulovacki and David W. Carley, US Patent 6,331,536 B1, December 18, 2001.
3. "Neuropharmacological Treatments of Sleep-Related Breathing Disorders"; Inventors: Miodrag Radulovacki and David W. Carley, US Patent 6,555,564 B1, April 29, 2003.
4. "Pharmacological Treatment for Sleep Apnea"; Inventors: Miodrag Radulovacki and David W. Carley, US Patent 6,727,242 B2, April 27, 2004.
5. "Neuropharmacological Treatment of Sleep-Related Breathing Disorders"; Inventors: Miodrag Radulovacki and David W. Carley, US Patent 6,974,814 B2, December 13, 2005.
6. "Pharmacological Treatment for Sleep Apnea"; Inventors: Miodrag Radulovacki and David W. Carley, US Patent 7,160,898 B2, January 9, 2007.
7. "Method for Treating Sleep Apnea"; Inventors: David W. Carley and Miodrag Radulovacki, US Patent 7,705,039 B2, April 27, 2010.
8. "Methods for treating sleep disorders by cholecystokinin (CCK) receptor B antagonists": Inventors: David W. Carley and Miodrag Radulovacki, US Patent 8,053,413 B2, Nov. 8, 2011.
9. "Pharmacological treatments for sleep disorders (apnoe) with prostanoid receptor antagonists", Inventors: David W. Carley and Miodrag Radulovacki, US Patent 8,076,315, Dec. 13, 2011.

=== Inventor of the Year 2010 ===
Radulovacki was named the 2010 Inventor of the Year at the University of Illinois, alongside Carley. Radulovacki and Carley were honored by the University of Illinois for producing a dozen potential treatments for sleep apnea, many of which are now under consideration for commercial development. Their results have culminated in an IllinoisVentures-supported start-up company, Pier Pharmaceuticals, that focuses on the treatment of obstructive sleep apnea.

=== Membership in the Serbian Academy of Sciences and Arts ===
In October 2003, the Serbian Academy of Sciences and Arts in Belgrade elected Radulovacki as one of its Foreign Members for his significant scientific research contributions in the fields of Neuropharmacology, sleep disorders and sleep-related breathing disorders.

== Yugoslav Student Summer Program ==
In 1990, Radulovacki initiated the Yugoslav Student Summer Program at the University of Illinois at Chicago (UIC) and the University of Illinois at Champaign-Urbana (UIUC) after the creation of International Linkage Agreements between the UIC and the Universities of Belgrade and Novi Sad in Yugoslavia. The Yugoslav Student Summer Program lasted for 12 years and had 304 participants.

== Philanthropy ==
In 2005, Radulovacki established the Miodrag Radulovacki Family Prize for Excellence in Basic Sciences at the University of Illinois College of Medicine at Chicago. The purpose of the prize, given annually, is to honor a fourth year Medical student who displays a high degree of intellectual integrity and who has demonstrated strong academic achievement. The prize consists of a plaque and a check for $1,000.

Radulovacki made numerous contributions to his home town of Sremski Karlovci.

- In 2007, Radulovacki restored the symbol of Sremski Karlovci, a baroque fountain called the Four Lions Fountain, located in the central square of the city.
- In 2009, Radulovacki restored the baroque façades of the Ecological Center in Karlovci which occupies a historic building in the center of the town.
- In 2010, Radulovacki restored the monument of Serbian poet, Branko Radičević (Radichevich), at Stražilovo (Strazhilovo) which is located on a mountain-top surrounded by forests in the Fruška Gora (Frushka Gora) National Park near Karlovci.
- In 2011, Radulovacki financed the construction of a self-sustaining ecological building with solar panels and geothermal heat pumps in the courtyard of the Karlovci Ecological Center. In recognition of Radulovacki's philanthropy, the ecological center was renamed the Ecological Center Radulovački.

== Personal life ==
Radulovacki lived in Chicago. He was a cross-country skier. He participated in several Birkebeiner-Kortelopet cross-country ski marathons in Cable-Hayward, Wisconsin. Radulovacki died on May 27, 2014, in Belgrade, Serbia, while on two-week trip to promote his philanthropic projects. He is survived by two sons (Brad Radulovacki and Branko Radulovacki) and four grandchildren (Grant, Katie, Reid and Ryan).

== Selected publications ==
1. Radulovacki, M (1973). "5-Hydroxyindoleacetic acid in cerebrospinal fluid: Measurements in wakefulness, slow-wave and paradoxical sleep". Brain Research. 50 (2): 484–8. doi:10.1016/0006-8993(73)90757-9. PMID 4705518.
2. Kovacević, R; Radulovacki, M (1976). "Monoamine changes in the brain of cats during slow-wave sleep". Science. 193 (4257): 1025–7. Bibcode:1976Sci...193.1025K. doi:10.1126/science.948760. PMID 948760.
3. Radulovacki, M; Buckingham, RL; Chen, EH; Kovacević, R (1977). "Similar effects of tryptophan and sleep on cisternal cerebrospinal fluid 5-hydroxyindoleacetic and homovanillic acids in cats". Brain Research. 129 (2): 371–4. doi:10.1016/0006-8993(77)90018-X. PMID 884510. S2CID 39245160.
4. Radulovacki, M; Walovitch, R; Yanik, G (1980). "Caffeine produces REM sleep rebound in rats". Brain Research. 201 (2): 497–500. doi:10.1016/0006-8993(80)91060-4. PMID 7417859. S2CID 8131652.
5. Radulovacki, M; Zak, R (1981). "Amphetamine abolishes REM sleep rebound in rats: Effect of single injection". Brain Research. 217 (2): 420–4. doi:10.1016/0006-8993(81)90022-6. PMID 7248800. S2CID 27030990.
6. Radulovacki, M; Virus, RM; Djuricic-Nedelson, M; Green, RD (1984). "Adenosine analogs and sleep in rats". The Journal of Pharmacology and Experimental Therapeutics. 228 (2): 268–74. PMID 6694111.
7. Radulovacki, M (1985). "Role of adenosine in sleep in rats". Reviews in Clinical & Basic Pharmacology. 5 (3–4): 327–39. PMID 3916307.
8. Radulovacki, M (2005). "Adenosine sleep theory: How I postulated it". Neurological Research. 27 (2): 137–8. doi:10.1179/016164105X21814. PMID 15829175. S2CID 37526153.
9. Radulovacki, M; Trbovic, SM; Carley, DW (1998). "Serotonin 5-HT3-receptor antagonist GR 38032F suppresses sleep apneas in rats". Sleep. 21 (2): 131–6. doi:10.1093/sleep/21.2.131. PMID 9542796.
10. Carley, DW; Radulovacki, M (1999). "Role of peripheral serotonin in the regulation of central sleep apneas in rats". Chest. 115 (5): 1397–401. doi:10.1378/chest.115.5.1397. PMID 10334159.
11. Prasad, B; Radulovacki, M; Olopade, C; Herdegen, JJ; Logan, T; Carley, DW (2010). "Prospective trial of efficacy and safety of ondansetron and fluoxetine in patients with obstructive sleep apnea syndrome". Sleep. 33 (7): 982–9. doi:10.1093/sleep/33.7.982. PMC 2894441. PMID 20614859.

== Related publications ==
- Ryan, CM; Bradley, TD (2005). "Pathogenesis of obstructive sleep apnea". Journal of Applied Physiology. 99 (6): 2440–50. doi:10.1152/japplphysiol.00772.2005. PMID 16288102.
- Stone, KL; Ewing, SK; Ancoli-Israel, S; Ensrud, KE; Redline, S; Bauer, DC; Cauley, JA; Hillier, TA; Cummings, SR (2009). "Self-reported sleep and nap habits and risk of mortality in a large cohort of older women". Journal of the American Geriatrics Society. 57 (4): 604–11. doi:10.1111/j.1532-5415.2008.02171.x. PMC 2927342. PMID 19220560.
