= Parage =

Parage may refer to:

- Parage (Bačka Palanka), a village in Serbia
- Paréage, a feudal treaty in medieval France
