= Nadarević =

Nadarević (Serbian Cyrillic: Надаревић) is a Bosniak surname. Notable people with the surname include:

- Mustafa Nadarević (1943–2020), Bosnian and Croatian actor
- Safet Nadarević (born 1980), Bosnian footballer
- Omer Nadarević (born 1985), Bosnian youtuber
- Enis Nadarević (born 1987), Bosnian footballer
