= Mudja =

Serbian YouTuber (born 1998)

Mudja (Муђа)
- Born: Stefan Vuksanović; 4 September 1998 (age 28); Požarevac, Serbia, FR Yugoslavia
- Occupation: YouTuber
- Partner: Jana Dačović (2016-present)

YouTube information
- Channel: Mudja
- Years active: 2013–present
- Genres: vlog; gaming; comedy; survival horror; tutorial; challenge
- Subscribers: 2.27 million
- Views: 1.4 billion
- Last updated: 23 April 2026

Stefan Vuksanović (born September 4, 1998) (Serbian Cyrillic: Стефан Вуксановић), better known by his channel name Mudja (Serbian Cyrillic: Муђа), is a Serbian YouTuber, internet personality, gamer, entertainer and a live streamer. In 2017, Vuksanović became the first Serbian to reach 1 million subscribers.

== Personal life ==
Stefan Vuksanović was born in Drmno, Požarevac, Serbia on September 4, 1998. His father Saša Vuksanović is an interior designer, and his mother is Vesna Vuksanović. Vuksanović grew up in poor conditions, living inside a leaking house. With YouTube, he managed to make a better living for himself and his family. The name for his YouTube channel originates from his grandpa, when Vuksanović was younger, people mocked him for his nickname. Vuksanović finished primary and high school in Kostolac.Vuksanović stated in a podcast. He is in a relationship with another Serbian YouTuber known as Jana Dačović.

== Career ==
Vuksanović created his first YouTube video when he was only 15 years old. He managed to get his father Saša to help create videos with him for YouTube. His YouTube channel name was named SuperSRBGamer, until November 12, 2013, when he changed his YouTube name to Mudja. In 2014, Vuksanović and his father started recording gaming videos, and the first video game they recorded together was the football game PES. He and his father are primarily known for their GTA 5 videos. He managed to achieve a YouTube first achievement, getting a Silver Play Button on March 21, 2015, and on August 12, 2017, he received a Golden Play Button by achieving 1,000,000 subscribers.

In 2016, Vuksanović was featured on the Junior Gaming League Minecraft event, alongside YouTubers SerbianGamesBL, MarkoKOFS, BloodMaster, and FullTV.

In 2017, Vuksanović and his father were at the Balkan Tube Festival in Belgrade, alongside other YouTubers such as Marija Žeželj, Miloš HD, and SupremeNexus. Vuksanović also had two famous Serbian singers, Vuk Mob and Gasttozz, as his guests for one of his videos, where the two singers competed against each other in the video game Grand Theft Auto V.

In 2018, Vuksanović was brought to the Reboot InfoGamer festival in Zagreb. In the same year, Vuksanović and his father raised money for a humanitarian action of an ill 3-year-old girl named Nikolina.

In 2019, Vuksanović was brought by Coca-Cola and Lvl8 to the Gaming in the Sky festival in Zagreb. It was also revealed that his YouTube channel name is one of the most searched terms in Serbia on YouTube, alongside Zadruga, Rasta, Baka Prase etc. In the same year, Vuksanović toured in Niš, Serbia, alongside Dijamant as a sponsor with a caravan vehicle. Other YouTubers were included as well such as Baka Prase, Stuberi and Yasserstain.

== See also ==
- Video game genre
- List of video game genres
