= Grave of Branko Radičević in Stražilovo =

Memorial in Serbia

Coordinates: 45.1667°N 19.9136°E

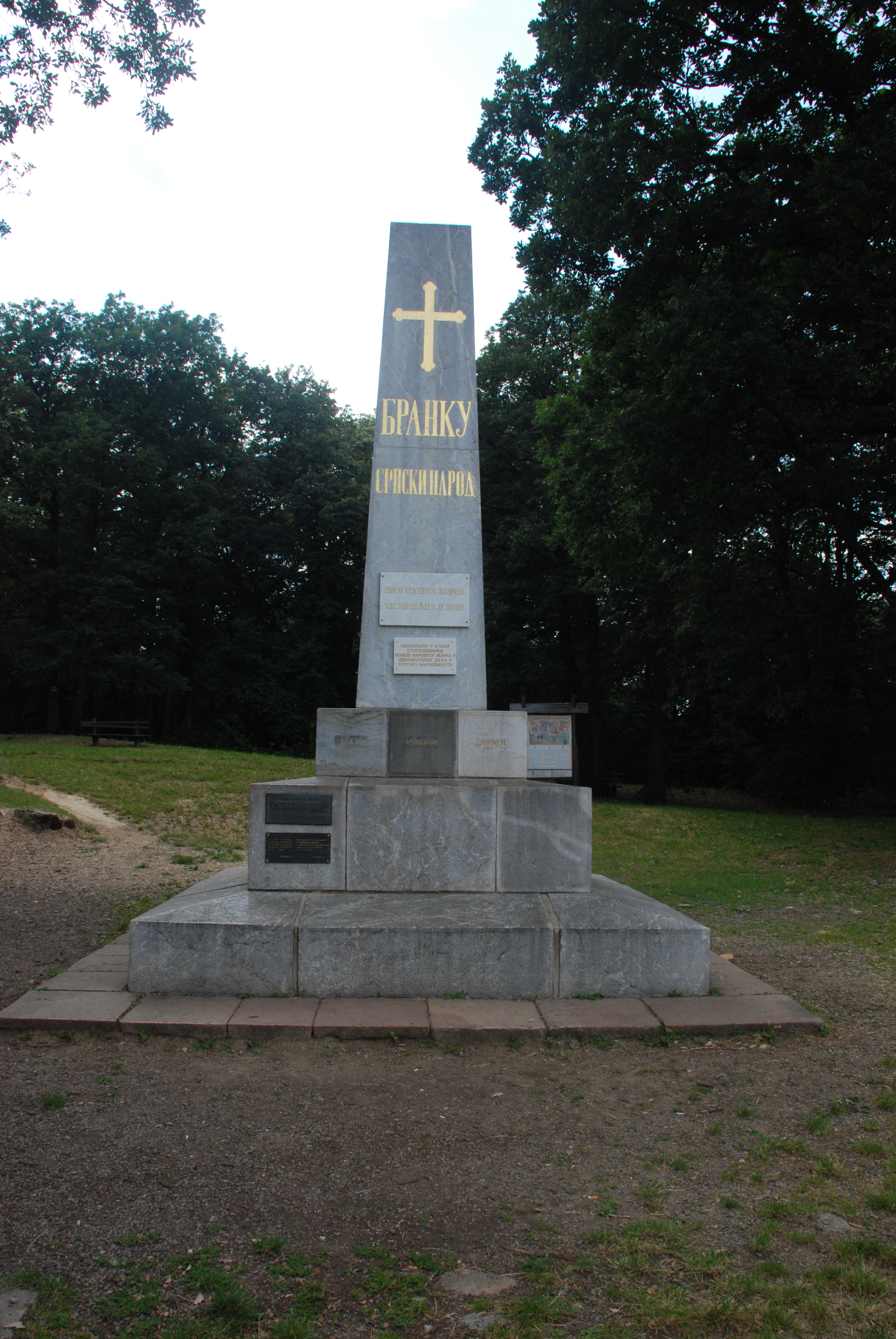
The grave of Branko Radičević in Stražilovo

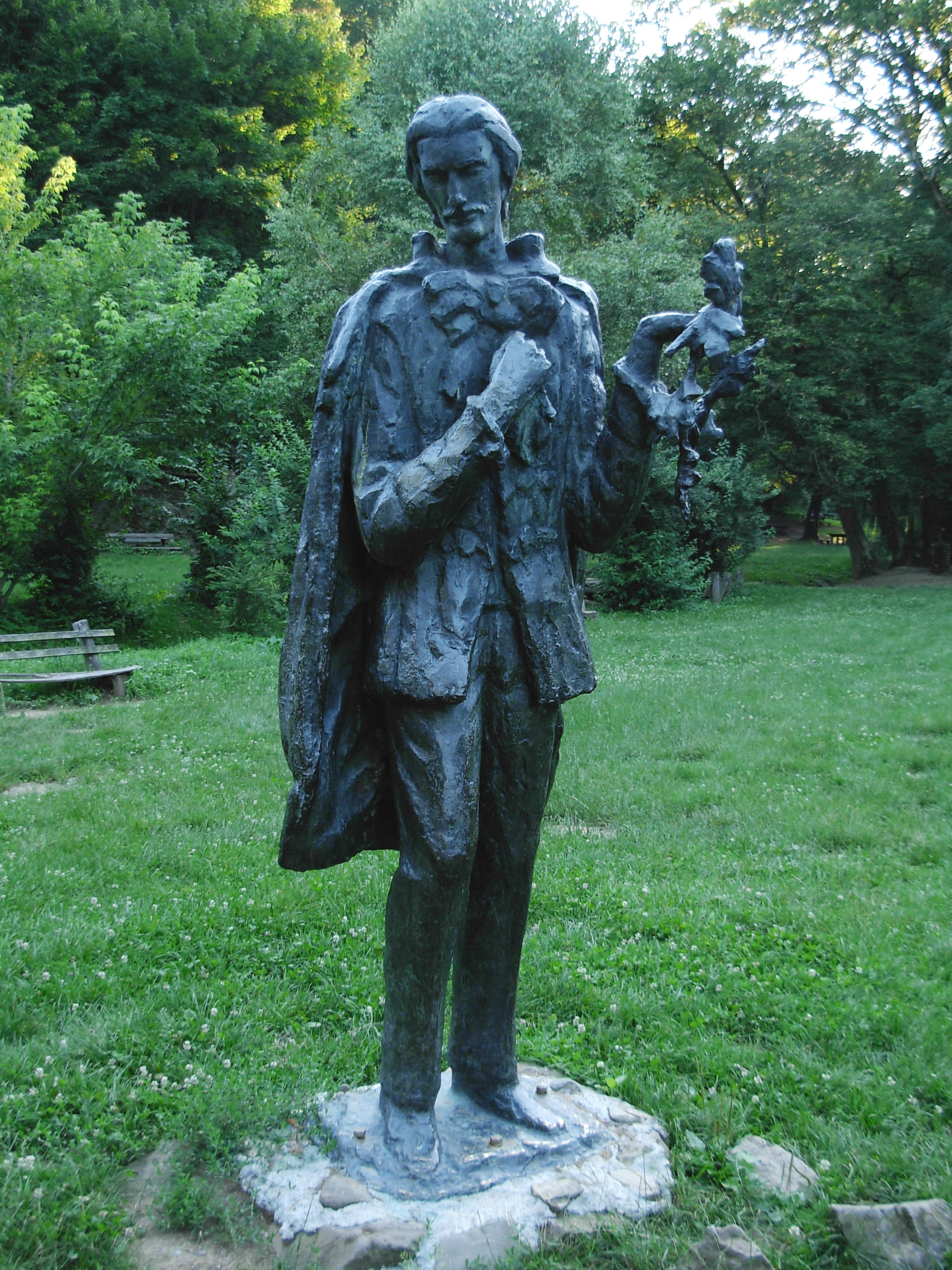
Statue of Branko Radičević in Stražilovo

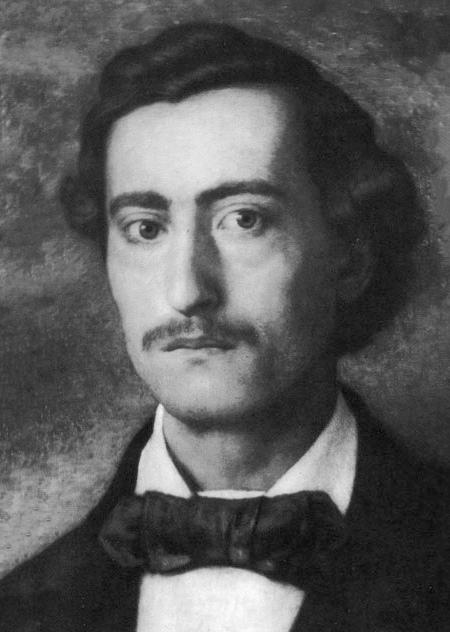
Branko Radičević

The grave of Branko Radičević on Stražilovo is a famous place of great importance, dedicated to the famous Serbian poet Branko Radičević, on the hill of the same name on Fruška Gora, above Sremski Karlovci.

== Importance ==
The great poet of Serbian romanticism, Branko Radičević, like other students of the famous Karlovac High School, visited Stražilovo during his free time during his schooling in Sremski Karlovci (1837–1840). He dedicated his famous song Đački rastanak to Stražilovo, where he, already suffering from tuberculosis, expressed his desire to rest forever in this place. However, Radičević died in Vienna in 1853 at the age of 29, where he was originally buried.

On the thirtieth anniversary of the great poet's death, an incentive was given to move his remains to Sremske Karlovci, to Stražilovo. Branko's body was ceremoniously transferred from Vienna to Stražilovo on June 22, 1883. In 1885, the people of Karlovci erected a monument worthy of the poet. It was built according to the project of Svetozar Ivačković, and it was built by the Italian Petar Kituzi from Dubrovnik. The building stone for the monument was brought from different areas where the Serbian people lived. A cross is drawn in the middle of the pyramid at the top, and below it are carved the words: "Branku - Serbian people". At the foot of the monument, there is a tombstone, brought from Vienna, with the text:

Wanted a lot, started a lot,
The hour of death, distracted him!

The monument was officially unveiled on September 27, 1885, in the presence of a large number of citizens and members of the Serbian National-Church Assembly. During the Second World War, the Ustaše destroyed the grave, and it was rebuilt during the centenary of Branko's poetry.
