= Grković =

Origin
- Language: Serbian
- Meaning: grk - "Greek"
- Region of origin: Balkans

Grković (Serbian Cyrillic: Грковић) is a Serbian patronymic surname, derived from the nickname Grk translated to "Greek". Notable people with the surname include:

- Branko Grković (1920–1982), Bosnian-Herzegovinian composer, pianist, music educator, and writer
- Jovan Grković-Gapon (1879-1912), former Serbian Orthodox monk turned guerrilla fighter
- Trajko Grković (1919-1943), Yugoslav partisan
- Jelena Grkovic
- Radovan Grković (1913—1974), Yugoslav partisan

== See also ==
- Grčinić
- Grčić
