= Bogoboj Atanacković =

Serbian writer (1826–1858)

- Богобој Атанацковић; Atanackovics Bogoboj
- Portrait of Atanacković
- Born: Timotej Atanacković; 10 June 1826; Baja, Kingdom of Hungary
- Died: 28 July 1858 (aged 32); Baja, Kingdom of Hungary
- Occupations: Writer, lawyer
- Writing career
- Language: Serbian
- Notable work: Dva idola (1851)
- Literary movement: Romanticism

Bogoboj Atanacković (Serbian Cyrillic: Богобој Атанацковић; Hungarian: Atanackovics Bogoboj; 10 June 1826 – 28 July 1858) was a Serbian Romantic-era writer and lawyer. He is best known for the novel Dva idola (1851), noted for realistic detail and a plain, accessible style associated with the language reforms of Vuk Karadžić.

Active in the Serbian uprising of 1848, he later worked in Baja and died of tuberculosis at the age of 32.

== Life ==
Atanacković was born into a bourgeois Serbian family in Baja. He began his education in his hometown and attended the Gymnasium of Karlovci before continuing his studies in Bratislava, Budapest and Vienna. Influenced by Romantic ideas of Serbian national renewal, he adopted the name "Bogoboj" in place of "Timotej" at the age of eighteen.

He enrolled in law studies in Bratislava in 1844, and later continued them in Budapest and Vienna, where he was associated with Serbian Romantic circles influenced by Vuk Karadžić, and was acquainted with Đuro Daničić and Branko Radičević. Following his participation in the Serbian uprising of 1848 and the May Assembly in Sremski Karlovci, he left for Vienna and later Paris. He returned to Baja in 1849, and from 1850 travelled in several Western European countries, including France, Switzerland, Germany, the Netherlands and Italy. He moved to Novi Sad in 1851 and worked as secretary to the Orthodox bishop Platon Atanacković. In 1852 he returned to Baja and opened a law office.

He died of tuberculosis in Baja in 1858, aged 32.

== Works ==
His 1851 novel Dva idola brought Atanacković wider recognition. Later critics have reassessed his standing, but the novel was well received by many contemporaries. His fiction often drew on autobiographical material and on people and events he knew, and is characterized by the use of realistic detail. Commentators have also noted his plain, accessible style, associated with the language reforms of Vuk Karadžić and the work of Đuro Daničić.

Critics have described Atanacković's novels as marked by a pessimistic outlook and a restrained tone. His work often drew on contemporary events and on experiences from his own life. In his later fiction, commentators have noted an emphasis on contingency, with chance events frequently shaping the outcomes of his characters' lives.

As a novelist and short story writer, Atanacković set out his views on the aims and value of fiction in essays that were published posthumously and later reprinted in collections of his writings.
