= Omčo =

Bosnian YouTuber (born 1985)

- Born: Omer Nadarević; 28 October 1985 (age 41); Bihać, SR Bosnia and Herzegovina, SFR Yugoslavia
- Occupations: YouTuber, comedian, filmmaker, internet personality

YouTube information
- Channels: Omcoo; FatTV
- Years active: 2009–present
- Genres: parody; action-slapstick; challenges
- Subscribers: 3.63 million (Omcoo); 8.36 million (FatTV)
- Views: 2.2 billion (Omcoo); 7.3 billion (FatTV)
- Last updated: 25 August 2026

Omer Nadarević (born 28 October 1985), known online as Omčo, is a Bosnian YouTuber, comedian, filmmaker, and internet personality. He is recognized for satirical sketches parodying Balkan lifestyles and for creating the globally popular English-language YouTube channel, FatTV. Nadarević is considered one of the most prominent digital creators in the Balkans.

== Personal life ==
Nadarević got married at the age of 20, and in 2009 he had a son, Džanan. However, the marriage did not last because his wife cheated on him with his aunt's son. He had also been open about his difficult family circumstances, particularly during his appearance on the reality television show Parovi. He has served as the primary caregiver for his parents, Muharem and Merima, both of whom have faced severe health challenges. He remarried in 2024.

== Career ==
Nadarević began creating comedy content in 2000, long before the rise of social media in the Balkans. His first notable project was a sketch titled "Hitna odmoć". In 2009, he transitioned to digital platforms by launching his first YouTube channel under the name Šeherzad, which was later rebranded to Omčo. His early videos, such as "Omčo feat bika", gained traction for their raw, satirical take on regional life.

By 2014, Nadarević's output increased significantly, focusing on exaggerated parodies of Bosnian/Balkan stereotypes and cultural tropes. During this period, he became a household name in the Balkan.

His content often features "cringe" humor and physical comedy, frequently involving his son Džanan, uncle, mother, long-term collaborator Meca Cazin and others. His channel's growth was explosive, reaching 100,000 subscribers in 2017 and surpassing 1 million in 2019.

In 2019, he produced and starred in the action-comedy film YouTube Ratovi (YouTube Wars). The film featured a large ensemble of the region's top creators, including Baka Prase, Braco Gajić and SerbianGamesBL, depicting a fictionalized battle between YouTubers and malicious "haters".

Recognizing the limitations of the local market, Nadarević launched FatTV in April 2019, targeting an international English-speaking audience. The channel focuses on absurdist superhero parodies and wordless slapstick comedy, making it accessible regardless of language barriers.

== Controversies ==
In 2021, a video created by Nadarević faced significant public backlash for controversially mocking a funeral. In the video he and his family were all drinking alcohol, playing the kolo and eating on the coffin.

In February 2023, Nadarević addressed public speculation regarding his wealth through legal representatives, clarifying that while his channels are highly successful, media reports of multi-million dollar annual earnings were inaccurate and potentially compromised his family's safety.
