= Manojlo Grčić =

Manojlo Grčić (Serbian: Манојло Грчић) is a legendary hero in Serbian epic poetry. He was of Greek origin, which is also emphasized by the etymology of his surname which is diminutive of "Greek" in Serbian. A poem about Manojlo Grčić was also found in the Erlangen Manuscript.

== Historical person ==
Early folkloristic sources emphasized that Grčić Manojlo was not based on any historical figure.

Early historical sources, starting with Konstantin Nikolajević and Ilarion Ruvarac, connected the figure of Grčić Manojlo with a cousin of Serbian Despotess Irene Kantakouzene (son of Thomas Kantakouzenos). V. Ćorović believed that the historical person was unpopular among the people of Serbia which attributed him some very bad characteristics, including his willingness to replace babies during baptism in exchange for money.

According to some later sources, it was actually the historical figure of Manuel I Komnenos that served as an inspiration for the figure of Grčić Manojlo.

According to some scholars, Manojlo Grčić and Majstor Manojlo, another character of Serbian epic poetry, are the same person.

== Poems ==
The epic poems about Manojlo Grčić include:

- Manojlo Grčić and the Arab (Serbian: Манојло Грчић и Арапин)
- Ćirjak i Grčić Manojlo (Serbian: Ћирјак и Грчић Манојло)
- Godfathering of Grčić Manojlo (Serbian: Кумовање Грчића Манојла), recorded in Montenegro
- Prayer is heard (Serbian: Услишена молитва)
- Marriage of Grujica Novaković (Serbian: Женидба Грујице Новаковића)
- Sister of Pletikosa Pavle and Grčić Manojlo (Serbian: Сестра Плетикосе Павла и Грчић Манојло)

One of the songs about Grčić and Starina Novak was based on the Story of India which was translated in the 15th century from Latin to the Slavonic-Serbian language.
