= Branko Radičević =

Serbian poet (1824–1853)

Aleksije Branko Radičević Алексије Бранко Радичевић
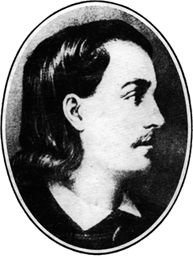
- Born: Aleksije Radičević; 28 March 1824; Slavonski Brod, Austrian Empire (modern-day Croatia)
- Died: 1 July 1853 (aged 29); Vienna, Austria-Hungary (modern-day Austria)
- Education: Gymnasium of Karlovci
- Occupation: Poet
- Writing career
- Pen name: Branko
- Notable works: Đački rastanak Kad mlidijah umreti
- Literary movement: Romanticism

Aleksije "Branko" Radičević (Serbian Cyrillic: Алексије Бранко Радичевић, Serbian pronunciation: [brǎːŋko radǐːtʃeʋitɕ]; 28 March 1824 – 1 July 1853) was a Serb poet from the Austrian Empire who wrote in the period of Romanticism.

== Biography ==
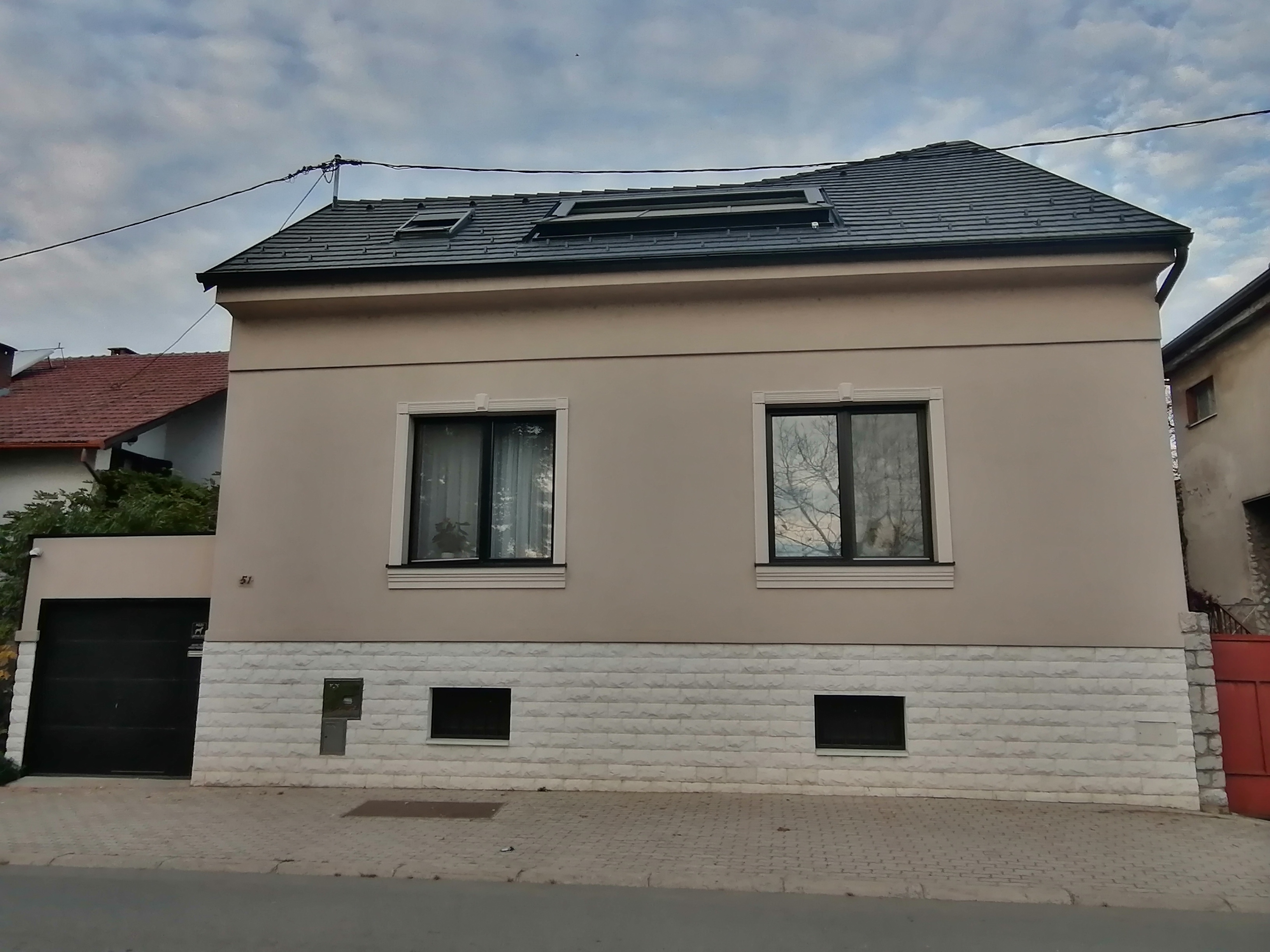
House of Branko Radičević in Slavonski Brod

Branko Radičević was born in Slavonski Brod on 15 March 1824. Aleksije was his baptismal name before he changed it to Branko, a more common Serbian name. He finished high school in Sremski Karlovci, the setting of his best poems. He then studied in Vienna. In 1847 Radičević's first book of poetry appeared, launching a new era in Serbian poetry. He went to Serbia but soon returned to Vienna to study medicine, where he was surrounded by Serb intellectuals, either living in the city or passing through, including his lifelong friend Bogoboj Atanacković, Vuk Karadžić, Đuro Daničić, Milica Stojadinović-Srpkinja and Petar II Petrović-Njegoš. Radičević's second collection of poetry is considered weaker than his first. Near his death he wrote a notable poem titled Kad mlidijah umreti (As I Thought of Dying).

He was one of the first authors to write poetry in the simple language of the common folk. He attempted to recreate the rhythm of the folk song, thus supporting the belief of Vuk Karadžić that even poetry can be written in the newly reformed Serbian language. Radičević proved to be very important to Vuk Karadžić's victory because he gathered his generation of young writers and poets around the cause of language reform.

Skerlić writes in his History of New Serbian Literature that Branko Radičević had a significant influence on Jovan Jovanović Zmaj, Bogoboj Atanacković, Kosta Ruvarac, Jovan Grčić Milenko, and other Serbian poets and writers of the period.

Radičević died of tuberculosis in Vienna 1853 and in 1883 his remains were buried in Stražilovo.

== Poetry ==
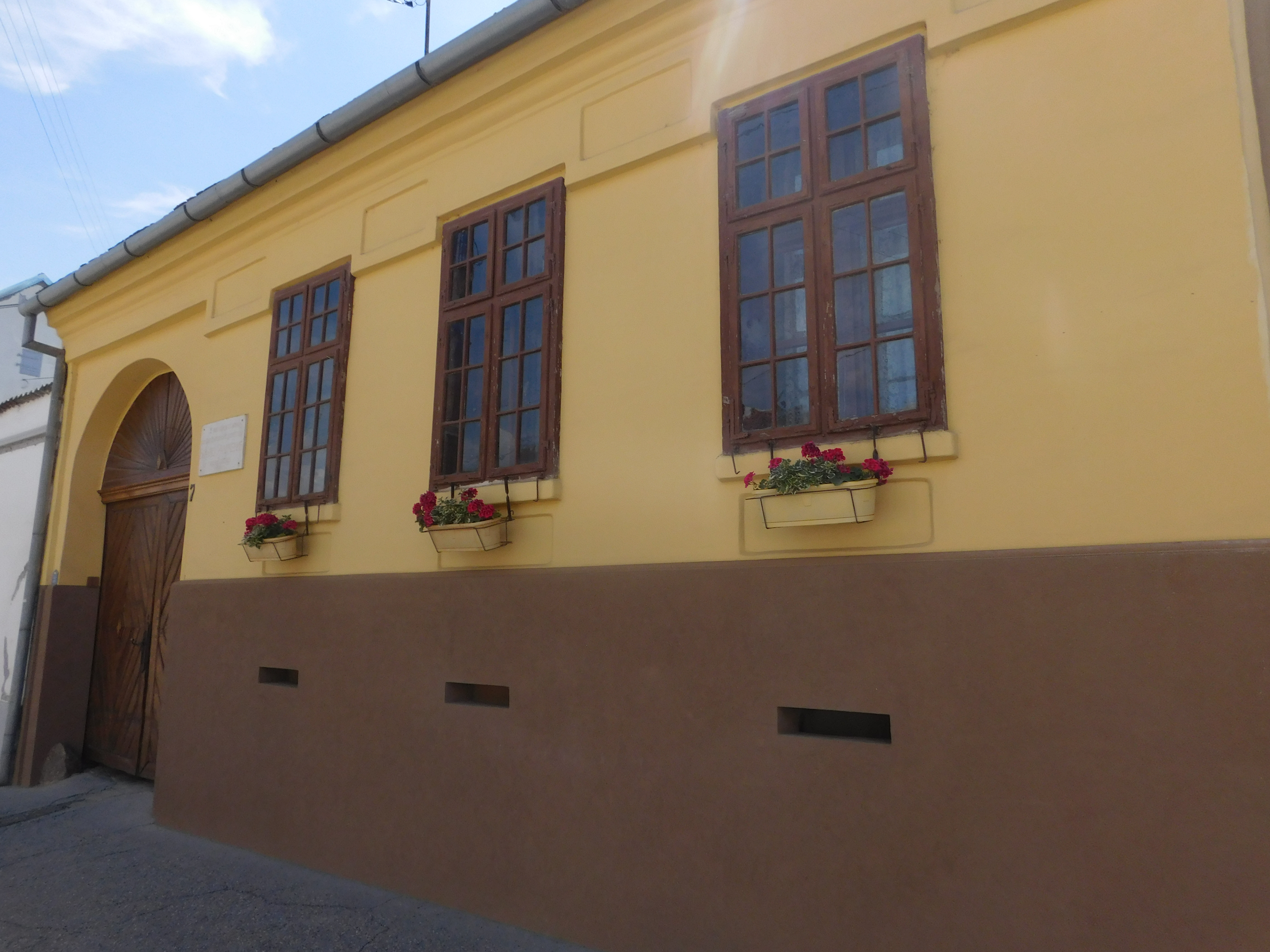
House of Branko Radičević in Sremski Karlovci

Đački rastanak (The Parting of Schoolfriends) is the most popular of his works. In it, Radičević portrayed the life of college students. For a time he gives himself up to the fleeting impressions of the moment.

In Put (A Journey), a magnanimous allegory, Radičević shows a skill in satirical nomenclature by stigmatizing Vuk Stefanović Karadžić's adversaries who disapproved the reforms of language and orthography.

With Bezimena he changed his style, from the influences by Byron and Romanticism, towards Pushkin's Eugene Onegin and Vissarion Belinsky's essay of 1843 about Pushkin and Realism.

His work gave an important contribution to Vuk's victory in the cultural battle for language reform.

The collected works of Branko Radičević were published in 2025 by Matica srpska and the Serbian Literary Cooperative.

== Legacy ==
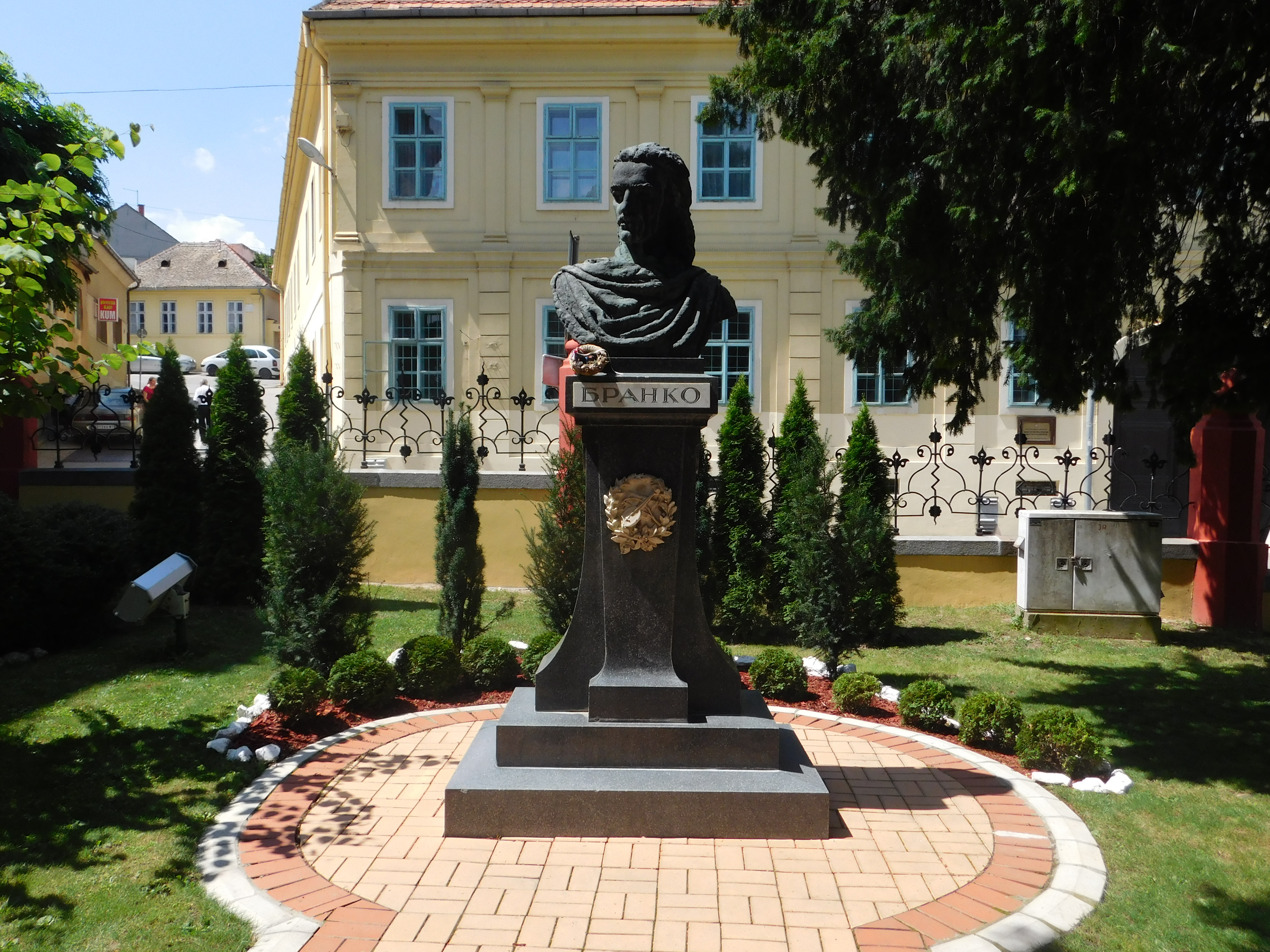
Monument of Branko Radičević in Sremski Karlovci

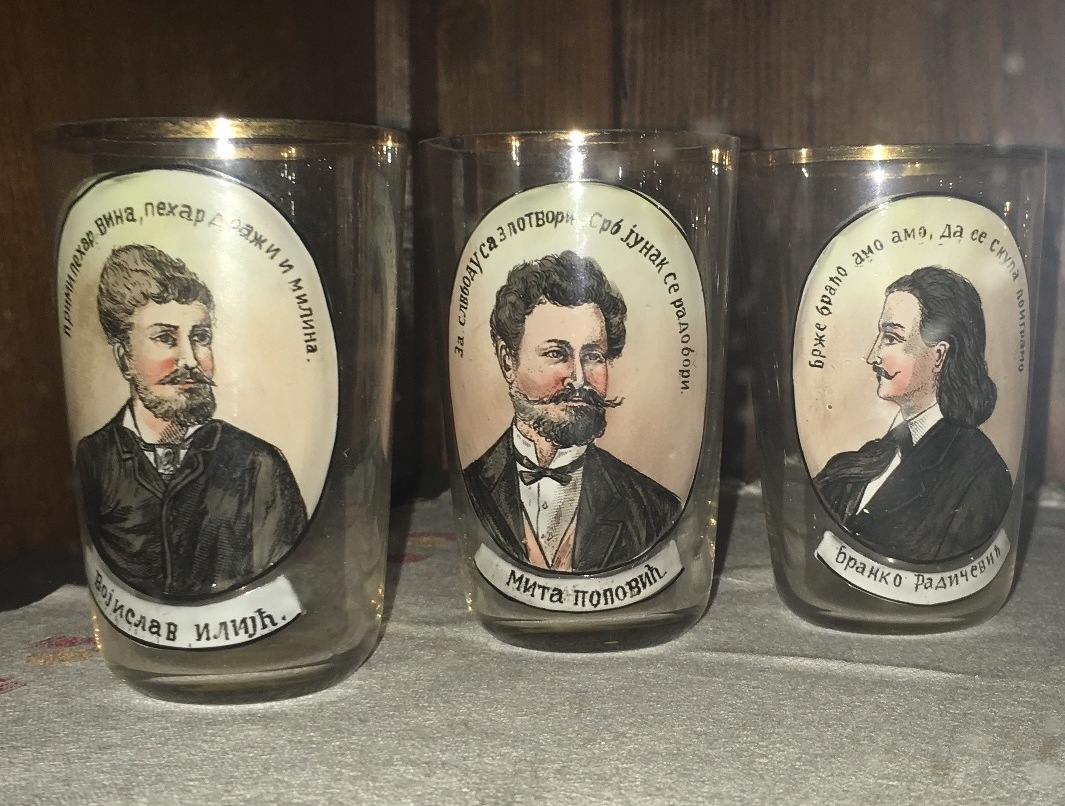
Drinking glass with portrait of Radičević, Despić House

Radičević left some unfinished work. He left at least one text meriting close attention in any inquiry into Slavic Romantic irony, and the ambitious unfinished poem of 1477 lines, composed in 1849 which featured two titles: Ludi Branko (Branko the Fool) and Bezimena (Unnamed). Seventy-four years later, literary critics Pavle Popović and his brother Bogdan Popović found that in this poetic fragment "there is no poetry whatsoever" and that it "merits no compliment of any kind."

He is included in The 100 most prominent Serbs. He influenced future generations of Serbian poets, including Đura Jakšić, Jovan Milenko Grčić and Miloš Crnjanski.

His statue made by Jovan Soldatović and a plaque on his birth house were removed during the 90s from Slavonski Brod. There are ongoing talks to rebuild the statue.

A number of his poems were turned into music.

Branko's Award was founded in 1954 in his honour. It is awarded for the best book of poetry in Serbian, published by authors under the age of 30. Winners include Vasko Popa, Aleksandar Tišma, Duško Trifunović, Tanja Kragujević, Ljubivoje Ršumović, Nina Živančević, Oto Horvat, Ana Ristović among others.

Squares in Zemun and Sremski Karlovci were named after him.

Schools in Batajnica, Velika Moštanica, Novi Beograd, Novi Sad, Banja Luka, Negotin, Smederevo and other cities are named after him.

== Selected works ==
- Kad mlidijah umreti (As I Thought of Dying)
- Tuga i opomena (Sadness and Warning)
- Đački rastanak (The Parting of Schoolfriends)
- Put (A Journey)
- Bezimena (Unnamed)
- Utopljenica
- Osveta

== See also ==
- Serbian literature
