= Jakov Gerčić =

Serbian historian and academic

Jakov Gerčić (Serbian Cyrillic: Јаков Герчић; 10 November 1788 – 2 September 1851) was a Serbian historian from the Habsburg Empire, professor and the first Serbian director of the Karlovci Gymnasium in Sremski Karlovci.

== Biography ==
Gerčić was born in Šid, where he attended primary school. He finished high school in Sremski Karlovci, philosophy in Szeged, and mathematics in Pest.

In 1815, the patronage of the Karlovci Gymnasium elected him professor of the humanities. Gerčić left Gymnasium in 1820, and became the educator of the son of Field Marshal Peter Duka von Kadar. He worked as an educator for three years, and in 1823 he returned to Karlovci as a professor. After the departure of the director Pavle Magda in 1825, the Patronage appointed Gerčić as the new director. Gerčić immediately started the reform of the curriculum in the Gymnasium. He was the first Serb to hold the position of director of the Karlovci Gymnasium, between the years of 1825 and 1851. He was especially interested in the study of history and Latin language. He was respected by his students, and was considered a good pedagogue. A large number of his manuscripts from Serbian and world history have been preserved in the Archives of the Karlovci Gymnasium, which he failed to complete.

When the Kragujevac Gymnasium was raised to the level of the Lyceum in 1838, Gerčić was offered to be a professor and rector of this educational institution. From 1850, he was a corresponding member of the Serbian Learned Society.
