= SerbianGamesBL =

Serbian streamer and YouTuber (born 1990)

SerbianGamesBL (СербијанГејмсБЛ)
- Born: Bogdan Lalović; 9 May 1990 (age 35); Čačak, SR Serbia, SFR Yugoslavia
- Occupations: YouTuber, internet personality

YouTube information
- Channel: SerbianGamesBL
- Years active: 2012–present
- Genres: vlog; gaming; comedy; survival horror; tutorial; challenge
- Subscribers: 1.35 million (SerbianGamesBL); 9.39 milion (Life Hacks & Experiments); 254 thousand (Godzilla)
- Views: 1 billion (SerbianGamesBL); 3.8 bilion (Life Hacks & Experiments); 86 milion (Godzilla)
- Last updated: 2 December 2025

Bogdan Lalović (born 9 May 1990) (Serbian Cyrillic: Богдан Лаловић), better known by his channel name SerbianGamesBL (Serbian Cyrillic: СeрбианГaмeсБЛ), is a Serbian YouTuber, internet personality, and gamer who primarily produces gaming content with a humorous commentary. He has been described as among the early creators of gaming commentary in the Serbian language on YouTube.

== Personal life ==
Bogdan Lalović was born in Čačak, Serbia, on 9 May 1990, where he also resides. Before his YouTube career took off, he used to sell socks.

== Career ==
Inspired by the American YouTuber Toby Turner (TobyGames), Lalović began his YouTube journey with the goal of creating similar content for the Balkan audience. He started his channel in 2012 and initially gained traction by playing Minecraft and PES 2013, eventually expanding to other games such as: FIFA, Happy Wheels, Counter Strike, GTA 5, Roblox, Slither.io, Agar.io, Who's Your Daddy?, Garry's Mod and more. His catchphrase, "Gde ste bre ljudi, evo nas ponovo u SerbianGamesBL" (transl. Where are you people, here we are again in SerbianGamesBL), is well-known among his followers. His content is characterized by unique humor and a lack of profanity, making it suitable for younger audiences. Lalović's success stems from his engaging commentary style, where he fully immerses himself in the game he is playing. Lalović has expanded his presence beyond his main SerbianGamesBL channel, running several other channels, including popular English-language channel's such as Life Hacks & Experiments and Godzilla.

At the beginning of 2015, Lalović underwent leg surgery due to injuries from an earlier period while playing football. In May 2015 he was back after his surgery ready to continue his Youtube career. In October 2015, he recorded the song "Gangsteri iz Dačije" with Mladen Jakovljević (Djomla KS), which got over 7 million views. He also appeared in music videos for popular Serbian music groups like In Vivo and Ministarke.

In 2016, Lalović was featured on the Junior Gaming League Minecraft event, alongside YouTubers Mudja, MarkoKOFS, BloodMaster, and FullTV.

In June 2017, Lalović experienced the Red Bull Air Race in person after virtually beating pilot Peter Podlunšek in a video game. He endured up to 10G forces and flew over 400km/h. Despite finding the experience physically grueling and vowing it was his first and last time in a race plane, he noted how realistically the game mirrored the actual Spielberg track and met racing legends like Paul Bonhomme.

In September 2017, Lalović responded with a Diss Track song addressing to Full Brother, who made one few days earlier on him. Lalović's video has received 11 million views, making it his most-watched video on his main YouTube channel. Although they called each other out in there diss track's, the drama wasn't real because they did it for fun to hype up there channels.

In January 2019, his main channel reached 1 million subscribers, becoming the third Serbian YouTuber to do so, after Baka Prase and Mudja.

In April 2019, Lalović was featured in the Gaming in the Sky festival in Zagreb in 2019, alongside other regional YouTubers such as Mudja.
