= Yasserstain =

Serbian YouTuber and film director (born 1994)

- Јасерштаин
- Born: Milan Inić; 27 December 1994 (age 31); Novi Sad, Serbia, FR Yugoslavia

YouTube information
- Channel: Yasserstain
- Years active: 2009–present
- Genres: Sketch comedy, educational, vlog
- Subscribers: 897,000
- Views: 451,235,870
- Website: https://yasserstain.com/

Milan Inić (born 27 December 1994), better known professionally as Yasserstain, is a Serbian YouTuber, author, and film director. He is most well known for being one of the first sketch content-based YouTubers in the Balkans.

== Early life ==
Inić was born on 27 December 1994 in Novi Sad. Growing up, he was introduced to the internet by a friend in 2008, which sparked his interest in online video creation. He attended Karlovci Gymnasium where he met many of his future production crew members. He later attended the Academy of Arts in Novi Sad, pursuing the field of film editing.

== Career ==
=== Early YouTube career (2009–2013) ===
Inić initially joined YouTube on 23 May 2009 on a channel called rrsspp4. He first discovered YouTube after a friend showed him Smosh's Food Battle 2008 video. The channel would later be compromised after Inić had opened a scam email.

Following this, he created the Yasserstain YouTube channel on 23 November 2009 alongside a group of friends. The channel's name was inspired by a sketch later uploaded to it, which was a parody of the popular character Frankenstein, combining it with the nickname of a friend they called "Yasser". One of his first videos to achieve popularity was the educational comedy video "Kako NE učiti" (How NOT to Study), published on 11 June 2013.

=== Rise to popularity and expansion (2014–present) ===
Inić's channel grew rapidly as he, along with his core production crew, consisting of his friends Petar, Singer, Dex, Igor, and Leni, focused on sketch comedy, vlogs, and educational content generally aimed at a younger demographic. Over the years, the channel was approached by various television networks, though Inić primarily opted to maintain his creative freedom and lack of strict deadlines on YouTube rather than transition to traditional television formats.

In addition to comedy sketches, the Yasserstain crew has ventured into music on multiple. Inspired by the YouTuber Nice Peter, Inić and Dex created a series called Dexkordi, where they turned YouTube viewer comments into original comedy songs. During 2016, the crew released 11 new songs, including popular hits such as "Drugačija", "Mekan", and "Čarli je postao gejmer". Inić also hosted a Q&A series titled Zbog sira from 2016 to 2019, where the crew directly interacted with their audience.

Inić is also known for emphasizing real-world interaction with fans through live shows and educational panels. In July 2017, he held a prominent lecture titled "Da li je strah toliko strašan" (Is Fear Really That Scary) as part of a youth development project at the Ušće Shopping Center in Belgrade, advocating for positive moral influence on the internet. He has also spoken at a public forum on young people's dependence on the internet.

In 2018, Inić published his first book, titled Nemoj biti taj L1K (Don't Be That Guy), through Vulkan Izdavaštvo. Spanning 176 pages, the book serves as a autobiography as well as an extension of his aptly-titled YouTube series and features a mix of humor, self-irony, and educational themes for teenagers and young adults.

In a 2022 podcast interview, Inić stated that video creation was his full-time job.

=== Film & television ===
Outside of his YouTube channel, Inić has worked as a director on multiple shorts for the Serbian-produced animated action series Puffins Impossible (2024), which featured Johnny Depp.

== Bibliography ==
- Nemoj biti taj L1K (2018, Vulkan Izdavaštvo) ISBN 978-86-10-02160-8
