= Kosta Ruvarac =

Serbian writer and literary critic (1837–1864)

Kosta Ruvarac (Stari Banovci, 1837 – Pest, 5 January 1864) was a Serbian writer and literary critic.

== Biography ==
Kosta Ruvarac, who came of a family of respected ecclesiastical hierarchs and historians, was born in Stari Banovci in Serbia in 1837. His biological brothers were historians Ilarion Ruvarac and Dimitrije Ruvarac. His oldest brother Lazar was a high-ranking civil servant in the Serbian government.

Kosta Ruvarac was educated in his hometown, Slankamen, Karlovci, Buda and Pest, where he studied law, philosophy and aesthetics. Ruvarac began to write while still in university for periodicals "Preodnica" and "Danica", a supplement of Matica Srpska, in 1857, and remained their literary critic until his early death; and he also became a literary critic for two other publications, "Srpski Dnevnik" and "Srpski List". Ruvarac contributed the journals critical notes and emendations on the poetry of Ljubomir Nenadović, Stojan Novaković, Jovan Subotić, Stevan Pavlović, Damjan Pavlović. Stojan Novaković was told by Kosta to take up another interest in literature but not poetry, a suggestion that Novaković immediately embraced and took up politics. Kosta's writings were afterwards collected in two volumes and published in 1866 and 1869, posthumously released by Đorđe Popović in Novi Sad.

Kosta knew his calling early. He told his father, Vasilije who was a parish priest, that he wanted to study rather than take up a career as a merchant. He wrote prose and verse and translated works of talented young writers of his day. Today Jan Palarik stands among the classics of Slovak dramatic literature, not only in Slovakia but in other South Slav countries, thanks to Kosta Ruvarac. In Palarik's plays, "Inkognito" he condemns the renegades and alcoholics and praises patriots. The play was translated into Serbian by Kosta Ruvarac and, as early as 1861, was performed by Serbian amateur theatrical groups in Pest. Later it was performed in Serbia with equal success.

Kosta Ruvarac proved his knowledge in the Literature of Dubrovnik by taking a critical look that immediately found followers among the new generation of literary critics, including Jovan Skerlić, Pavle Popović and Bogdan Popović, Slobodan Jovanović, Branko Lazarević. He is remembered as the literary critic and theoretician of the United Serb Youth. His writing style can best be described as simply elegant. Influenced by Bogoboj Atanacković, Ruvarac was the most representative figure of the United Serb Youth, better known as Omladina, and died of tuberculosis as a student on 5 January 1864. He was 27.

== Works ==
- Saski dvorac (Saxon Court; 1859), short story
- Verna Danica (Loyal Morningstar, unfinished; 1860), short story
- Karlovački đak (A Student from Karlowitz, 1863), short story
- Putovanje u sremski manastir Ravanicu (Travel to Srem's Ravanica), travelogue
- Sveti Andrija (Saint Andrija), travelogue
- Koliko i kako se dosada kod nas prevodilo sa grčkoga (How and how much we have translated from ancient Greek, 1859)
- O slovu Ԏ (about that letter, 1861)
- Lužički Srbi u Saksonskoj (Lusatian Sorbs in Saxony, 1862)
- Kratki nacrt povesnice slavenskog jezika (Outline of the Slavic language, 1862)
- Značajnost dubrovačke književnosti (The Value of Ragusan Literature, 1863)
