= Parage (Bačka Palanka) =

Parage Параге (Serbian)
- Village (Selo)
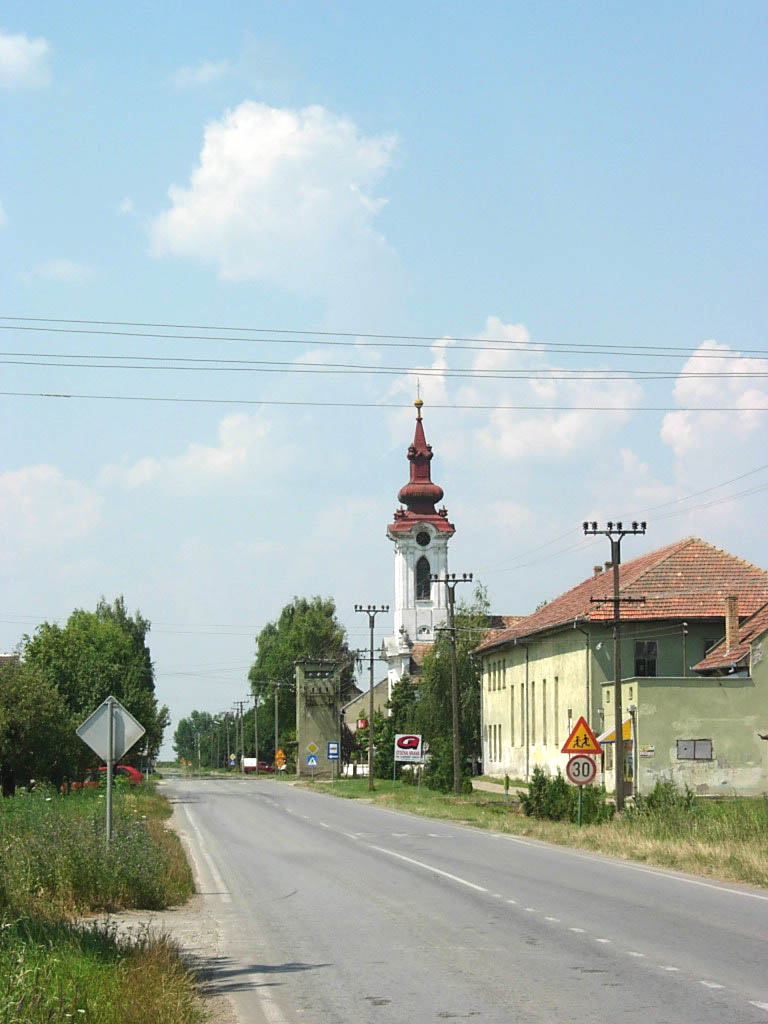
- The main street and the Orthodox Church

- Location within Vojvodina Location within Serbia Location within Europe
- Coordinates: 45°25′N 19°24′E
- Country: Serbia
- Province: Vojvodina
- Region: Bačka (Podunavlje)
- District: South Bačka
- Municipality: Bačka Palanka

Population (2011)
  - Total: 921
- Time zone: UTC+1 (CET)
  - Summer (DST): UTC+2 (CEST)
- Postal code: 21434
- Area code: 021
- Vehicle registration: BP

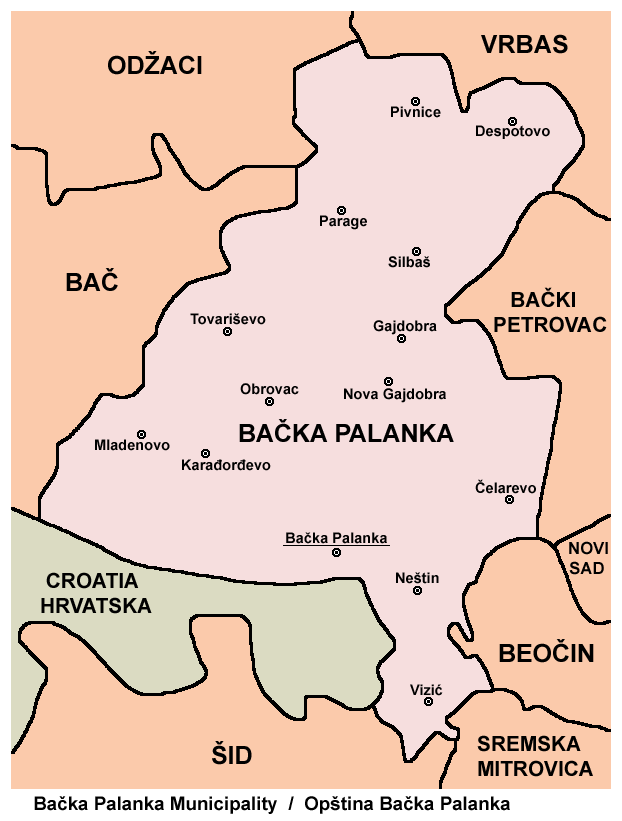
Map of the Bačka Palanka municipality, showing the location of Parage

Parage (Serbian Cyrillic: Параге) is a village located in the Bačka Palanka municipality, in the South Bačka District of Serbia. It is situated in the Autonomous Province of Vojvodina. The village has a Serb ethnic majority and its population numbering 1,039 people (2002 census).

== Name ==
In Serbian, the village is known as Parage (Параге), in Croatian as Parage, and in Hungarian as Parrag.

== History ==
Since its foundation, the village was mainly inhabited by Serbs. First historical source citing Parage dates back to 1473. At the end of 18th century village with entire population was moved 4 km to north, due to high ground-water levels, but also to make space for expansion of Gajdobra, place colonised with Germans by Austrian monarchy.

== Historical population ==
Year	Inhabitants
1722	51 households
1788	88 households
1875	1,151
1905	1,466
1961	1,338
1971	1,306
1981	1,199
1991	1,134
2002	1,039
2011	921

== Trivia ==
- Prominent Serbian national songs author from 19th century, Filip Višnjić is said to have been visited Parage in 1812.
- Railroad connecting Novi Sad and Sombor was made near Parage in 1890.

== Notable natives/residents ==
- Charles Alverson, British-American writer spent almost a decade living in Parage, before moving to Belgrade
- Miodrag Radulovacki, Professor of Pharmacology in the College of Medicine at the University of Illinois-Chicago

== See also ==
- List of places in Serbia
- List of cities, towns and villages in Vojvodina
