= Stražilovo =

Coordinates: 45°10′01″N 19°54′50″E

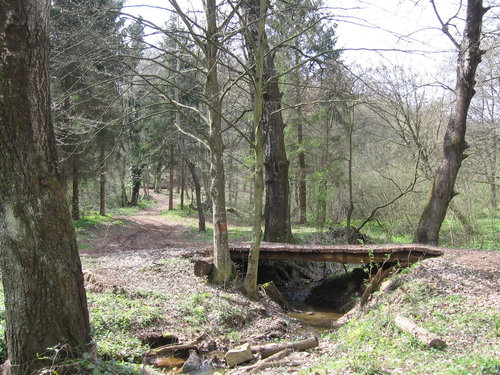
Stražilovo valley in Spring

Stražilovo is a wooded valley in the Fruška Gora mountain, Serbia. It is situated on the northeastern slopes of the Fruška Gora National park, about 5 km from Sremski Karlovci, and about 15 km from Novi Sad. It is the place where the monument is erected to the famous Serbian poet Branko Radičević. On weekends and during holidays, it is packed with visitors from nearby cities. There is a mountaineers' hut in Stražilovo, as it is also the starting point of the "Fruška Gora transversale" hiking trail, which runs around the mountain for more than 160 kilometers. Near Stražilovo, there are several Orthodox monasteries which date mostly from the 16th century.

== See also ==
- Sremski Karlovci
- Fruška Gora
