= Ilarion Ruvarac =

Serbian historian and Orthodox priest (1832–1905)

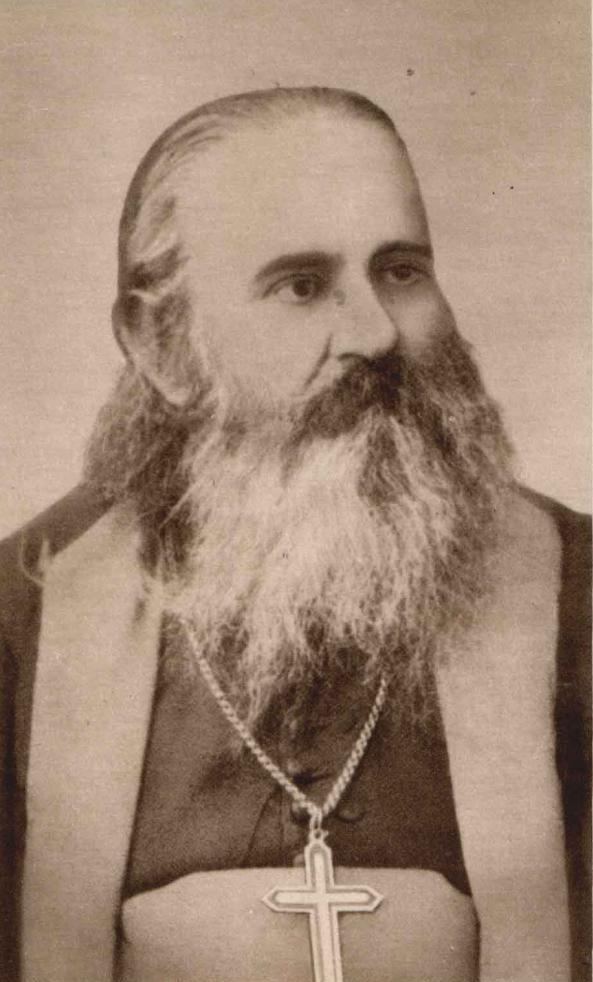
- Ilarion Ruvarac
- Born: Jovan; September 1, 1832; Sremska Mitrovica, Austrian Empire
- Died: August 8, 1905 (aged 72); Grgeteg monastery, Fruška Gora, Austria-Hungary
- Occupations: historian and Orthodox priest
- Known for: introduction of critical methods into Serbian historiography

Ilarion (Jovan) Ruvarac (Serbian: Иларион Руварац; September 1, 1832 – August 8, 1905) was a Serbian historian and Orthodox priest, a member of the Serbian Academy of Sciences and Arts (first Serbian Learned Society and Serbian Royal Academy of Sciences). He was the founder and one of the foremost proponents of the critical school of Serbian historiography. He was archimandrite of Grgeteg monastery.

== Biography ==
Jovan Ruvarac was born at Sremska Mitrovica on 1 September 1832 to Reverend Vasilije Ruvarac (1803–1873) and his wife Julijana, née Šević. He had three brothers, Lazar, Kosta and Dimitrije. Lazar Ruvanac became an official in the Serbian government, Kosta Ruvarac (1837–1864) was a writer and literary critic who died while still a student at a university in Pest, and Dimitrije Ruvarac (1842–1933) was a historian and Orthodox clergyman. The Ruvarac family settled in Syrmia in Austria-Hungary, today's Serbia, from the region between Bihać and Cazin, nowadays Bosnia and Herzegovina, then Ottoman Empire.

His childhood was spent at Stari Slankamen and Stari Banovci in Srem, where he went to grammar school. His family then moved to Karlovci and later to Vienna, where he completed his high school education at the Gymnasium of Karlovci and a gymnasium in Vienna before enrolling at the University of Vienna's School of Law in 1852. At the same time, he studied history; a passion of his going back to high school days when he was inspired by one of his professors Jakov Gerčić. While a student in Vienna, Ruvarac became involved with a social circle of prominent South Slavic intellectuals, such as the philologists Vuk Karadžić and Đuro Daničić, who gathered at the famous café Slavisches Kafeehaus.

During his studies, Ruvarac attended lectures by the Austrian historian Albert Jäger. He was also inspired by the works of Friedrich Christoph Schlosser, Georg Gottfried Gervinus and most notably Leopold von Ranke. Ruvarac took Ranke's principle of objectivity to history as the basis for his research.

After graduating with a law degree in 1856, he enrolled at the Theological Seminary of Saint Arsenius (Sveti Arsenije) in Sremski Karlovci, graduating in 1859. Upon completing his studies in law, history, and theology, he decided to take holy orders and the new name of Ilarion on the date of his tonsure at Krušedol monastery on 1 January 1861. Under his new name (Ilarion), he published numerous historical studies that he had written up until then. He was then appointed clerk of the Serbian Orthodox Ecclesiastical Court at Karlovci. In 1872 he became a member of the teaching staff at the Gymnasium of Karlovci, his Alma mater. He was elevated to the rank of Archimandrite at the Monastery of Grgeteg in 1874. A year later, he was appointed rector of the Theological Seminary of Saint Arsenius in Karlovci.

In early 1880 he was commissioned to report on the state of education among Serbs in Austria-Hungary, and his able performance of this task brought him an offer of the bishopric of Karlovci, which he declined. In 1882 he decided to resume his monastic career as archimandrite of the Monastery of Grgeteg. The last years of his life were passed in complete seclusion at the monastery. He died there on the 8th of August 1905.

Ilarion Ruvarac, like many of his Serbian peers of his day, spoke several languages, Latin, Greek, German, Hungarian, Rumanian, and Italian.

He was clerically conservative in orientation as well as non-national.

== Historiography ==
The most important for me is to tell truth, or to tell what I believe is truth.

— Ilarion Ruvarac

In 1887 a serious intellectual debate was being waged between adherents of old, traditionalist and romantic schools in Serbian historiography, represented by historians Panta Srećković and Miloš Milojević, and the advocates of the new, critical and realistic school, headed by Ilarion Ruvarac and Ljubomir Kovačević.

Ruvarac was the founder and one of the foremost proponents of the critical school of Serbian historiography. He stressed the importance of primary sources and documentation in the discovery of the past, differentiating between primary and secondary sources as well as separating historical evidence and literature. He advocated against the usage of Serbian epic poetry as a historical source, though recognizing its artistic value and rallied against the representation of Serbian history based on epics, myths and legends.

He used scientific approaches to refute many deeply rooted and beloved legends, traditions about the treachery of Vuk Branković, the eternal freedom of Montenegro, and the death of Tsar Stefan Uroš V at the alleged hands of Vukašin Mrnjavčević. Ruvarac exposed many Montenegrin fables that some wished to palm off as historical facts—either for personal, political gain, dynastic reasons (Habsburgs, Vatican, Ottomans), or simply to flatter their own vanity. He also proved that the so-called massacres as described in Njegoš's The Mountain Wreath and in the Montenegrin histories of that period, had never taken place. He knew that Njegoš used poetic license to create a drama in which he could get his ideas across.

Most of Ruvarac's career was spent struggling with national myths which distorted the historical truth, but there was no turning back after him, since he inspired other historians to investigate the past with a critical eye. The tradition of Ruvarac's scholarship and the critical method was carried on by Stojan Novaković (1842–1915), Ljubomir Kovačević (1848–1918), Mihailo Gavrilović, Stanoje Stanojević and many others. Jovan Radonić dedicated his first book to Ilarion Ruvarac honoring him for the introduction of the critical approach to Serbian historiography.

== Legacy ==
He is included in The 100 most prominent Serbs.

== Selected works ==
- O pećkim patrijarsima od Makarija do Arsenija III, 1868, 1879.
- Stari Slankamen, 1892.
- Dvije bosanske kraljice 1893.
- Banovanje Tvrtka bana 1333. do 1377, 1894.
- Montenegrina, prilošci istoriji Crne Gore, 1898.
- O humskim episkopima i hercegovačkim mitropolitima do godine 1766, 1901.
- Raški episkopi i mitropoliti 1901.
- Ruvarac, Ilarion (1902), Đurađ Vuković, despot srpski i Đorđe Kastriot-Skenderbeg vođ arbanaški, godine 1444 (Ђурађ Вуковић, деспот српски и Ђорђе Кастриот-Скендербег вођ арбанашки, године 1444 (George Vuković, despot of Serbians and George Kastrioti-Skanderbeg leader of Albanians)) (in Serbian), Štamp. srpske knjižare Braće M. Popovića

== Sources ==
- Antolović, Michael (2016). "Modern Serbian Historiography between Nation-Building and Critical Scholarship: The Case of Ilarion Ruvarac (1832–1905)" (PDF). Hungarian Historical Review. 5 (2): 332–356.
