= Karlovci Gymnasium =

High school in Sremski Karlovci, South Bačka, Vojvodina, Serbia

- Карловачка гимназија Karlovačka gimnazija
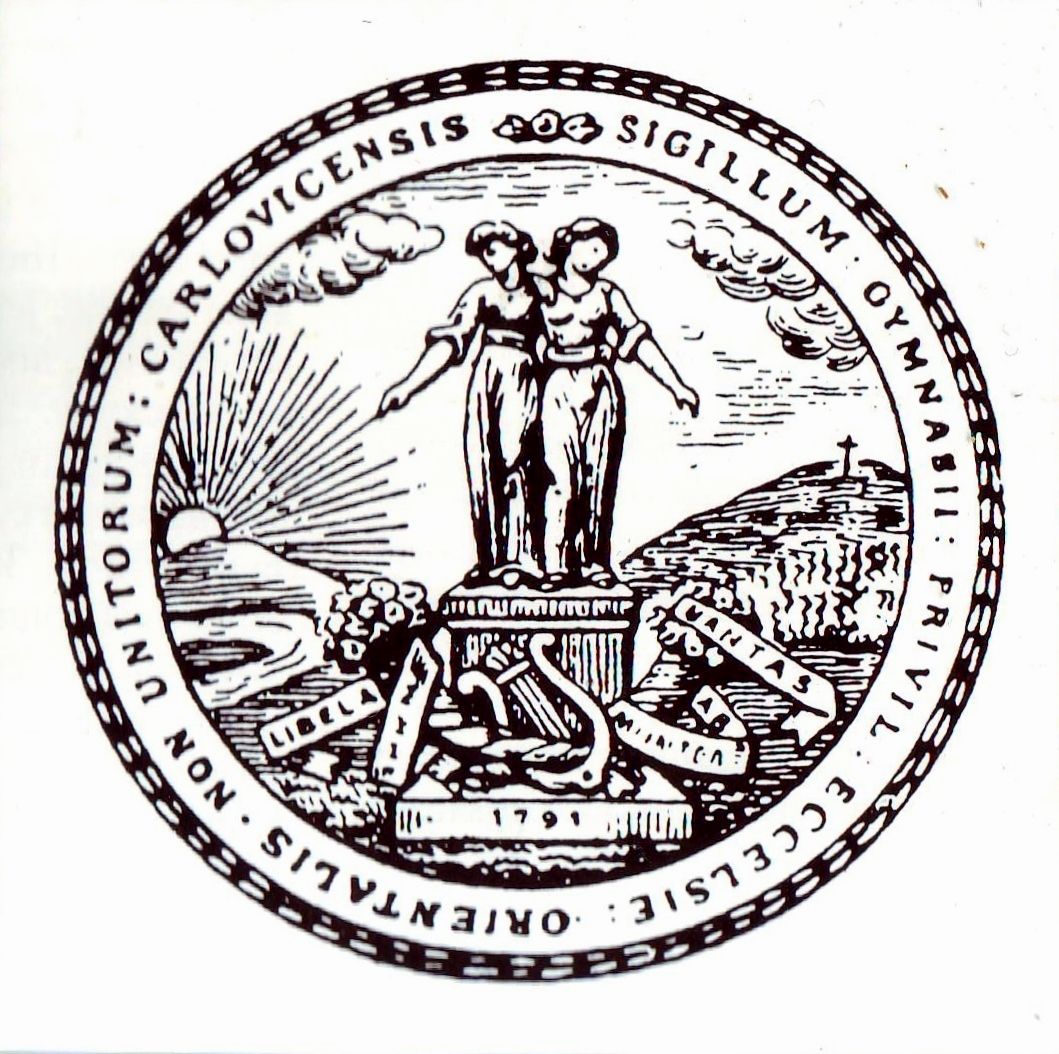

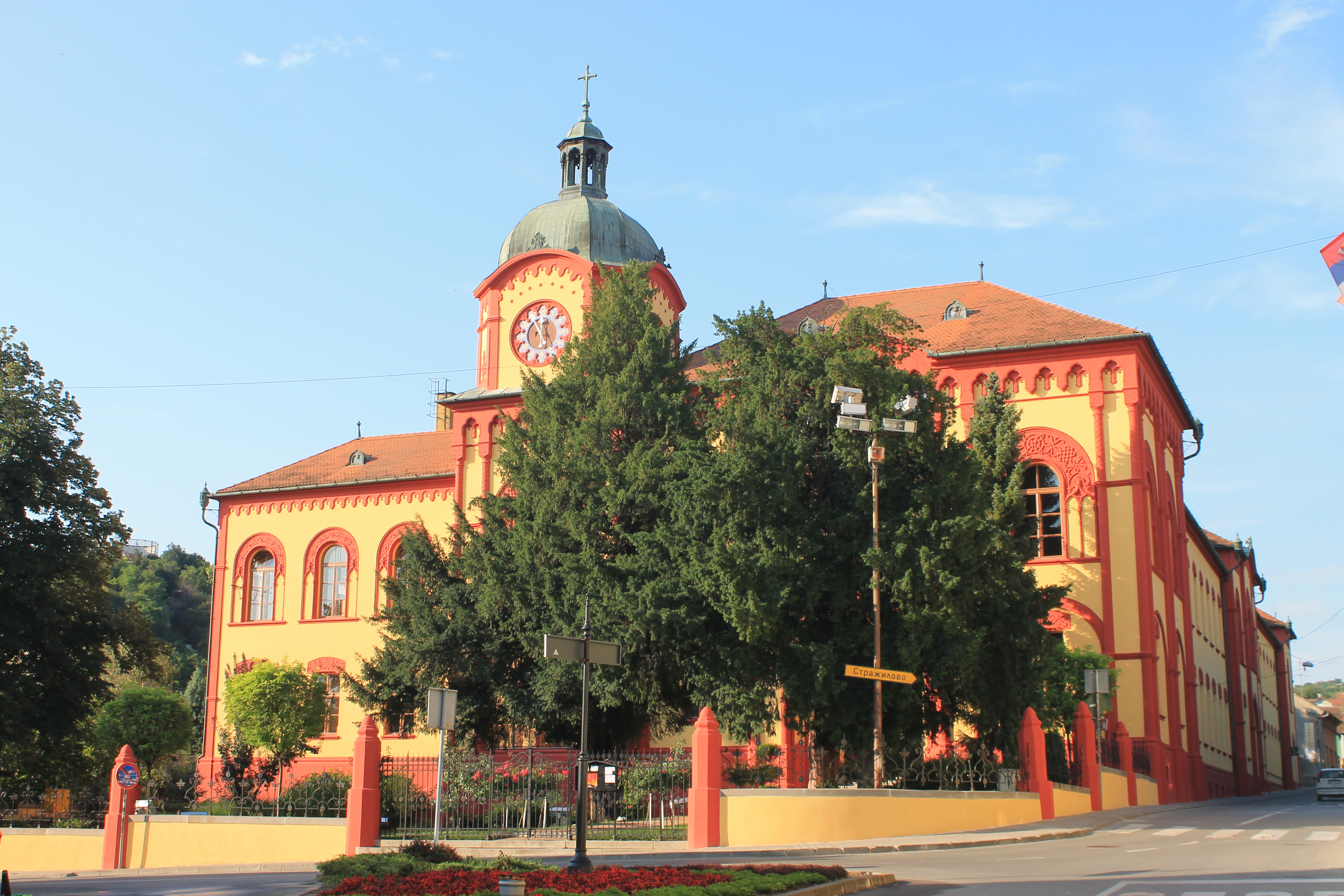
- Front view of Karlovci Gymnasium

Location
- Trg B. Radičevića 2 Sremski Karlovci, South Bačka, Vojvodina; Serbia; 45.201705°N 19.933547°E

Information
- School type: public, comprehensive high school
- Established: 1 November 1791; 234 years ago
- Status: open
- Principal: Dejan Orlić
- Classes: 6
- Average class size: 24
- Language: Serbian
- Website: KarlGimnazija.edu.rs

The Karlovci Gymnasium (Serbian: Карловачка гимназија, romanized: Karlovačka gimnazija) is the high school (gymnasium) located in the town of Sremski Karlovci. Founded in 1791, it is the oldest secondary school in Serbia. This type of school is comparable to U.S. college preparatory schools or English grammar schools.

== History ==
=== Under foreign rule ===
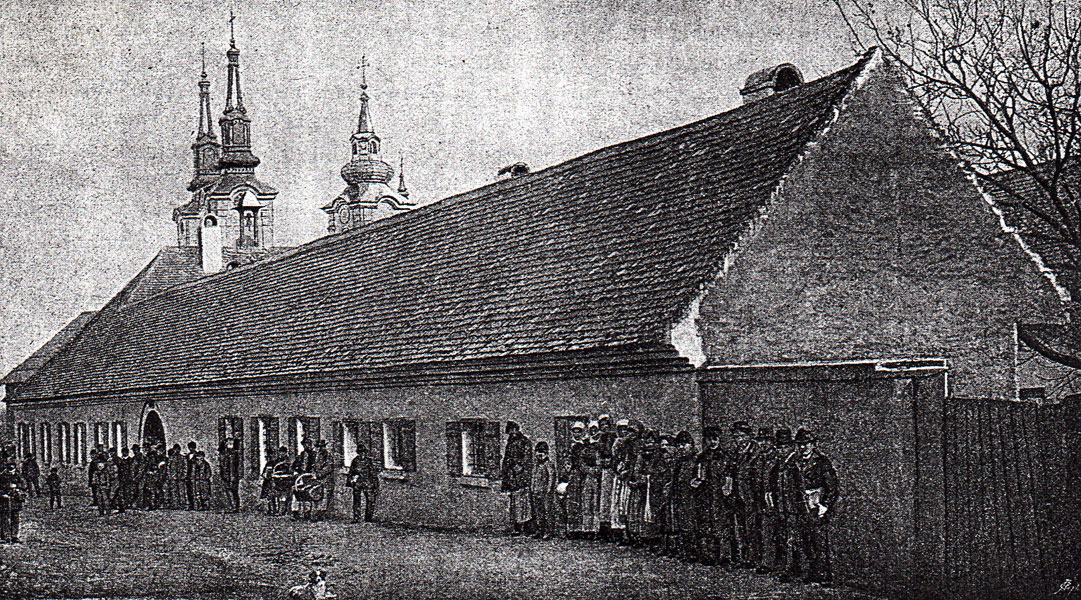
The original 1791 building, photographed in the late 19th century

After the Treaty of Karlowitz, the early eighteenth century was a difficult time for the Serbs in their northern lands (particularly in the region now called Vojvodina) under the new yoke of the Habsburg monarchy. The principle Cuius regio, eius religio was still in force throughout central Europe, though now pointing at members of the Eastern Orthodox Church instead of the Protestants. Judicial torture and cruel methods of execution were part of the legal process in the Holy Roman Empire until at least the nineteenth century. Despite the hardships and uncertainty of Ottoman rule, it is doubtful whether the many Serbs in Turkish-occupied Serbia would have preferred the life of millions of their Eastern Orthodox faithful who lived as serfs or feudal tenants in the Austrian Empire. Families were often forcefully removed from the feudal lands, deported, tortured and even executed at the whim of feudal landlords. Many Serbian families in the 1740s left for Imperial Russia to settle and start a new life among neighboring Zaporozhian Cossacks by founding New Serbia (historical province) and Slavo-Serbia. Enlightened Serbian bishops sent their students to Imperial Russia to study at the Kyiv-Mohyla Academy (now the National University of Kyiv-Mohyla Academy) and Moscow Academy with instructions to return home and teach in their newly founded institutions of learning.

Revulsion against the nature of Turkish rule should be measured against the standards prevailing in Christian central Europe during the eighteenth century. Schools of higher learning under the Habsburg empresses or emperors for Slavs in general and Serbs in particular were at a premium. Perhaps this explains the late flowering of educational institutions in territories under western European occupation, not to mention the territories of neighboring Serbs whose lot fared no better under Turkish domination.

=== Resurgence to modern period ===
The Serbian gymnasium was founded in 1791, though its origins go further back with a few reincarnations in between and different locations in town. According to Jovan Skerlić's Istorija Nove Srpske Književnosti (Belgrade, 1921, pages 19–20), the school's first organizer and teacher was Maksim Suvorov, a Russian scholar and educator, sent by Empress Catherine I of Russia in 1725 to open the Latin Gymnasium (Latinska Škola) a year later in Karlovci. It was due to the efforts of Metropolitan Mojsije Petrović of Karlovci who wrote a telling letter to the Tsar:

I don't ask for material amenities, but spiritual. I don't ask for money but for help enlightening the souls living amongst us. Be a second Moses for us and lead us from the ignorance of Egypt!

In February 1724, Peter the Great issued a decree on educational assistance, although during his lifetime these plans were not carried out for some reason. The first Russian teacher, Maksim Suvorov, arrived in the Balkans in August 1725, when Catherine I was already in power. At the request of the Metropolitan of Belgrade-Karlovac Vikentije Jovanović, and at the order of the Kiev Metropolitan Rafail Zaborovski, Emanuil Kozačinski with twelve other professors, among whom were a few Serb graduates from Kyiv-Mohyla Academy, arrived in Sremski Karlovci in early October 1733 and immediately began work on the reconstruction and organization of the newly built schools.

In 1729 the name was changed to Latinsko-Slavenska Škola (the Latin-Slavonic Gymnasium). Then in 1733 the name changed again to Škola Emanuila Kozačinskoga (Emanuil Kozačinski Gymnasium). The high school which had the longest existence was Pokrovo-Bogoradnična Škola, founded in 1749. It lasted for two decades before it was closed on political grounds by Austrian authorities. It wasn't until Metropolitan Stefan Stratimirović and Merchant Dimitrije Anastasijević (nicknamed Sabo), who donated 20,000 Austrian forints, that the construction of the new gymnasium began, but only after negotiations with the emperor were finalized and the licence to build was finally given.

The High School of Karlovci began its operations on 1 November 1791 and had six classes, four lower ( "Grammar"), and two higher (humanities). Also, there were two boarding schools in the complex, one for students whose families had means of support and the other for those of limited means. Blagodjejanije, one of a class of students at the gymnasium, who, being persons of 'limited' means, were received for lower fees, and obtained free commons, lodgings and other assistance towards their education during their terms of residence. The class of students who had 'means' was called konvikt. The teaching language—as in many other schools in the Holy Roman Empire of the time—was Latin, and the following subjects were taught:

- German language
- History
- Geography
- Natural science
- Anthropology
- Roman Antiquity
- Physics
- Logic
- Philosophy and Morals
- Greek language

The first director of the school was Andrija Gros, a Slovak by ethnicity, who received his doctorate from the University of Jena, and later came Andrija Volni, also a Slovak, who for 21 years managed the school. Metropolitan Stratimirović brought professors from the Slavic land of Slovakia, then under Austrian rule, and elected directors from there as well. The reason for this was to keep zealous Roman Catholic proselytizers, Hungarian and German influences at bay as much as possible. The next directors of the school were George Charles Ruma, and Paul Magda The present building was constructed in 1891 by Gyula Pártos. The school has a very valuable library of Serbian history in Hungary.

== Departments ==
The Gymnasium of Karlovci provides two departments: classical languages and modern languages. The classical language department concentrates on the study of Ancient Greek, while the modern language department offers English, Russian, German, Japanese, Chinese, Norwegian, Spanish and Italian. Classes in Latin and English are mandatory for both departments throughout the four-year study. Students from either department may choose to pursue additional languages in the form of extracurricular activity. Also, classes learn about theory and techniques of translation accompanying only the primary language. Today philology is studied at the school.

== Notable alumni ==
- Sima Milutinović Sarajlija
- Vuk Karadžić
- Branko Radičević
- Jovan Sterija Popović
- Milorad Popović Šapčanin
- Josif Rajačić
- Stevan Šupljikac
- Dimitrije Ruvarac
- Ilarion Ruvarac
- Miodrag Grbić
- Vida Ognjenović
- Dejan Medaković
- Oto Horvat
- Miodrag Radulovacki
- Vojislav Stanimirović
- Emanuel Kozačinski, noted professor
- Yasserstain, YouTuber and film director.

== See also ==
- Sremski Karlovci
- Buildings and structures in Sremski Karlovci
