= Valmont =

Valmont may refer to:

== Places ==
- Valmont, Moselle, a commune in the Moselle department, France
- Valmont, Seine-Maritime, a commune in the Seine-Maritime department, France
- Valmont, Colorado, an area northeast of central Boulder, Colorado, USA
- Valmont (river), a river in France that runs from Valmont, Seine-Maritime to the English channel

== Characters ==
- Valmont (Jackie Chan Adventures), a character in the animated television series Jackie Chan Adventures
- Vicomte Sébastien de Valmont, a character in the 1782 French novel Les Liaisons dangereuses and its adaptations, created by Choderlos de Laclos

== Film ==
- Valmont (film), a 1989 French-American drama film based on the novel Les Liaisons dangereuses, starring Colin Firth as Valmont

== Companies and products ==
- Valmont Industries, a large Nebraska-based manufacturer of center pivot irrigation systems and steel utility poles
- Valmont, a trade mark owned by Lactalis, a French dairy products corporation
- Valmont Group, a Swiss cellular cosmetics company

== See also ==
- Battle of Valmont, a 1416 battle in the area of Valmont, Seine-Maritime during the Hundred Years' War
- Valmont (sanatorium), Montreux, Switzerland
