= Louis Levacher =

French painter and sculptor

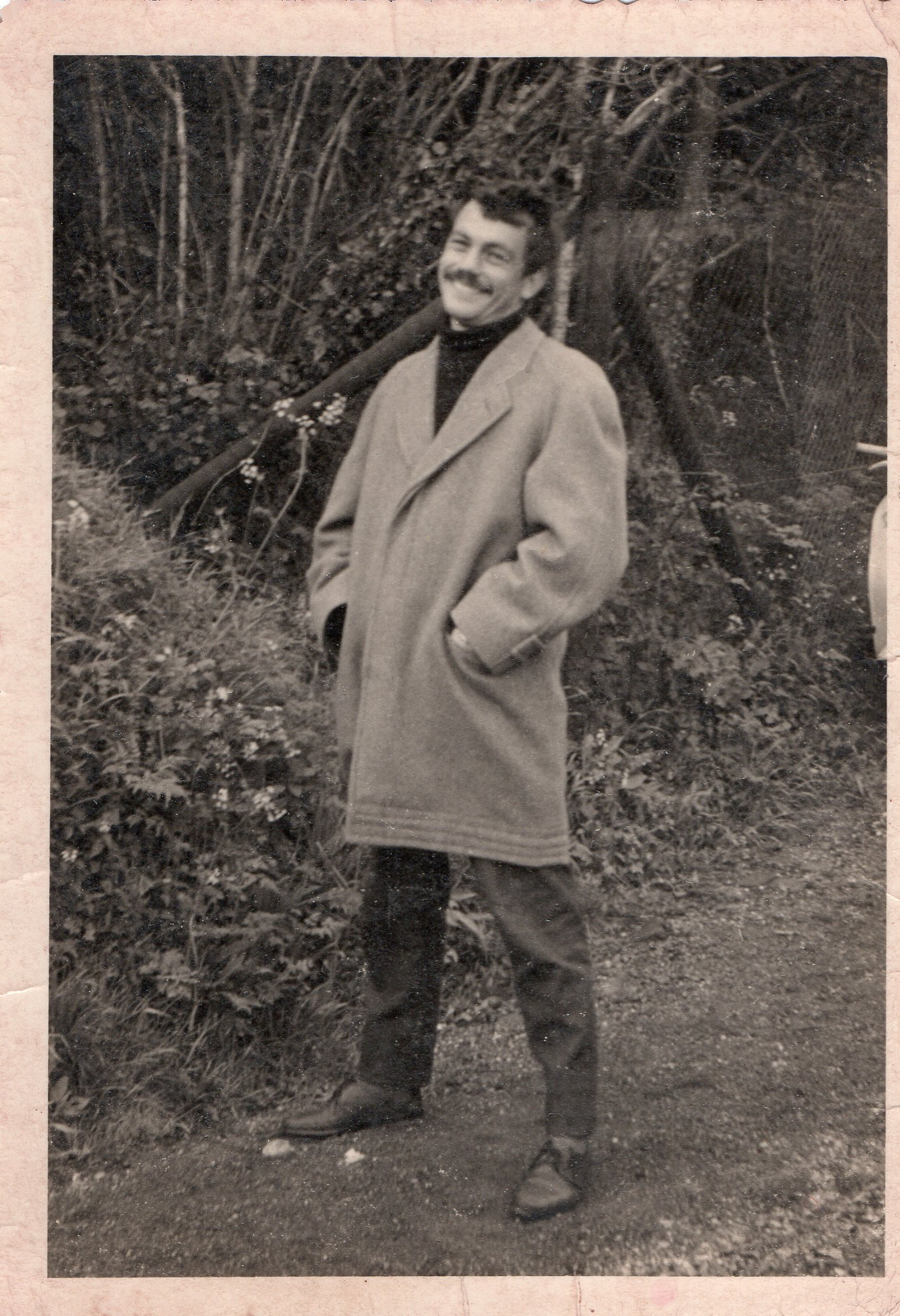
- Born: 15 August 1934
- Died: 7 March 1983 (aged 48); Harfleur, Normandy
- Spouse(s): Michèle Moreau (1942-2012), artist

Louis Levacher (15 August 1934 – 7 March 1983) was a French painter and sculptor.

== Lineage ==
The Levacher family is first mentioned in Contremoulins archives circa the late 18th century and appears to originate from the Valmont region. The older branch of the family moved to Montivilliers, while the younger branch moved to Criquebeuf-en-Caux, Yport, Saint-Valery-en-Caux, and finally to Fécamp. Members of this younger branch made their living as millers, then farmers, eventually becoming rope makers. Under the French Restoration, the Levachers of Fécamp gradually became merchants and ship-owners, ascending into the local petite bourgeoisie and enjoying a quick rise in social status. The family, however, would only hold this position for a little less than a century.

Louis Levacher's grandfather, a ship-owner and merchant, was also named Louis (1877–1949). He was awarded the cross of Verdun and subsequently handed over his business management to his wife, Marguerite Grivel. His son, Louis' father, also named Louis (1911–1988), owned a smokehouse. The buildings still partly belong to the family. Louis' mother, Denise Thomas (1913–2003), was a seamstress from a Doudeville family that dates back to the 17th century.

== Early life and background ==
Levacher was born in Harfleur and was an only child and was born five years before the start of the Second World War. His parents divorced during the war. While his grandfather's endeavours continued in spite of the war, those of his father were hampered by his deployment in 1940.

Levacher married Michèle Moreau (1942–2012). Soon after their marriage, Louis had to leave for Algeria.

Louis and Michèle had three children, two sons, and a daughter. The eldest son was named Louis, continuing the family tradition.

Louis Levacher worked as a driver, as well as a painter and sculptor. He is famous for his artistic work. Art was very much a family endeavor for the Levachers. Louis and his wife Michèle worked together, creating pieces with a highly original, avant-garde style. Michèle exhibited her work in various places, including the Basque country. While well-recognized both in Normandy and beyond, their art did not make them rich. His daughter also specialized in collage and sculpture, exhibiting her work in the region several times.

== Style and technique ==
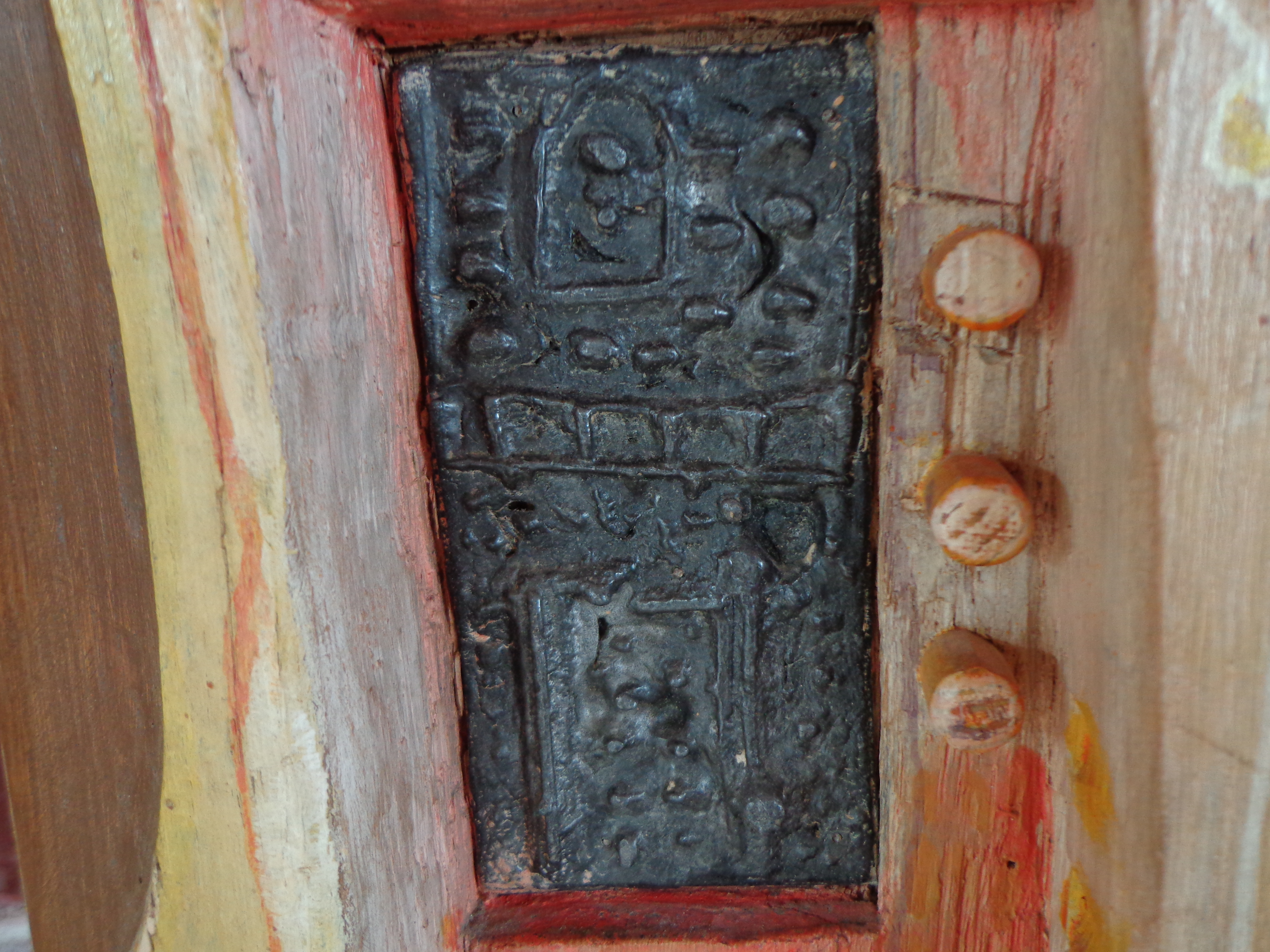
Sculpture of Louis Levacher

Levacher utilized various techniques in his art, encompassing painting and sculpture. His paintings showcased a blend of figurative and abstract elements, frequently employing large formats. In his sculptures, he masterfully combined genres, employing wood to portray saints or crafting intricately detailed totems.

== Exhibitions in France ==
- Biennale de Saint-Brieuc
- Salon de Rouen
- Salon de la Jeune Sculpture, Paris
- UHAP Salon, Le Havre
- Great Salon and Youth of Today, Paris
- Living in the city of Le Havre
- Salon d'Automne, Paris
- SAD Salon, Paris
- Salon Grand Quevilly
- Salon de Montrouge, Trappes
- Principle Gallery, Paris
- Laubie Gallery, Paris
- Beauvau Gallery, Paris
- Galerie de France, Paris
- Gallery "The Duplex," Le Havre
- Centre of Art and Culture, Castle Vascœuil
- Cultural Centre in Val Sandstone, Bolbec
- Centre d'Art Contemporain de Rouen and Abbey Ourville
- Museum of Menton
- Museum of the Future, Paris
- Museum of Modern Art of the City of Paris
- National Library, Paris
- Library of Vichy
- Library of Rouen
- Maison de la Culture in Le Havre
- "Horizon Youth", Grand Palais, Paris
- Espace Cardin, Paris
- "50 polychrome sculptures," Forume of Beaubourg, Paris
- "International Exhibition of sculpture," Le Vaudreuil

== Exhibitions abroad ==
- Show Mouscron, Belgium
- Royal Windsor Gallery, Brussels
- University of Heidelberg, Germany
- "Research and Expression" exhibition, the United States and Japan
- Assessment of Contemporary Art, Quebec
- Zoetermeer, Netherlands

== Sources ==
- Documentation belonging to the family Levacher.
- Documentation belonging to the family Grivel
- Soublin, Leopold (1991). Cent ans de pêche à Terre-Neuve (One Hundred Years of fishing in Newfoundland) (in French). Henri Veyrier. ISBN 978-2851995704.
- Municipal Archives and Contremoulins Fécamp
