= Yport =

- Commune
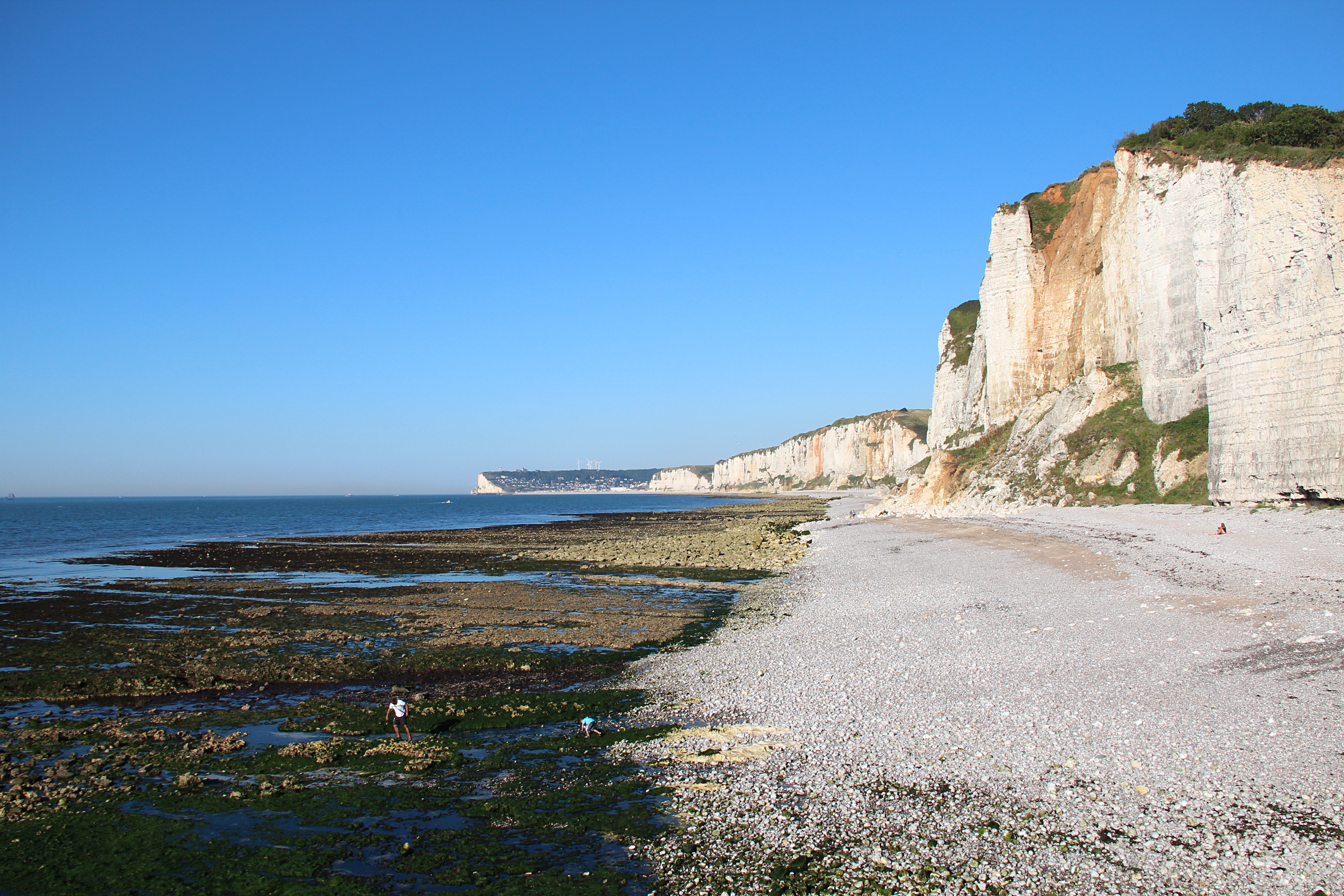
- The upstream cliffs

- Coat of arms
- Location of Yport
- Location within France Location within Normandy
- Coordinates: 49°44′19″N 0°18′50″E
- Country: France
- Region: Normandy
- Department: Seine-Maritime
- Arrondissement: Le Havre
- Canton: Fécamp
- Intercommunality: Fécamp Caux Littoral

Government
  - Mayor (2026–32): Philippe Capron
- Area^{1}: 2.07 km^{2} (0.80 sq mi)
- Elevation: 30 m (98 ft)
- Highest elevation: 96 m (315 ft)
- Lowest elevation: 0 m (0 ft)
- Population (2023): 652
  - Density: 315/km^{2} (816/sq mi)
- Time zone: UTC+01:00 (CET)
  - Summer (DST): UTC+02:00 (CEST)
- INSEE/Postal code: 76754 /76111
- ^{1} French Land Register data, which excludes lakes, ponds, glaciers > 1 km^{2} (0.386 sq mi or 247 acres) and river estuaries.

Yport (French pronunciation: [ipɔʁ]) is a commune in the Seine-Maritime department of France’s Normandy region. The residents are known as Yportais or Yportaises.

== Location ==
Yport is located on the D104 road, about 19 miles (31 km) north of Le Havre, on the coast of the English Channel.

== Population ==
Historical population
| Year | Pop. | ±% p.a. |
|---|---|---|
| 1968 | 1,193 | — |
| 1975 | 1,159 | −0.41% |
| 1982 | 1,121 | −0.48% |
| 1990 | 1,141 | +0.22% |
| 1999 | 1,011 | −1.34% |
| 2007 | 1,005 | −0.07% |
| 2012 | 923 | −1.69% |
| 2017 | 798 | −2.87% |
| 2023 | 652 | −3.31% |
Source: INSEE

== History ==
The site was probably occupied during the Neolithic period, and later the Pays de Caux were inhabited by the Calates. During the Roman era, a road connecting Fécamp to Étretat passed through the locality at Fond Pitron from where a junction towards the village existed. The current D940 follows the route of this Roman road. The Roman presence was discovered following various archaeological excavations but did not prove that it was permanently inhabited. It may have been only a fishing site. Starting from the early Middle Ages the village was attached to Criquebeuf-en-Caux, where the church, the cemetery and the school were located, several kilometres away from Yport. Only in the 19th century did the commune of Yport come into existence, primarily because of the construction of the church. Officially, the commune was created on 1 January 1843, and its first mayor was Jean-Baptiste Feuilloley. The sea front was developed in the 19th century. As a working port, it had fishing-smacks, skiffs, caïques and other vessels moored up to the bollards.

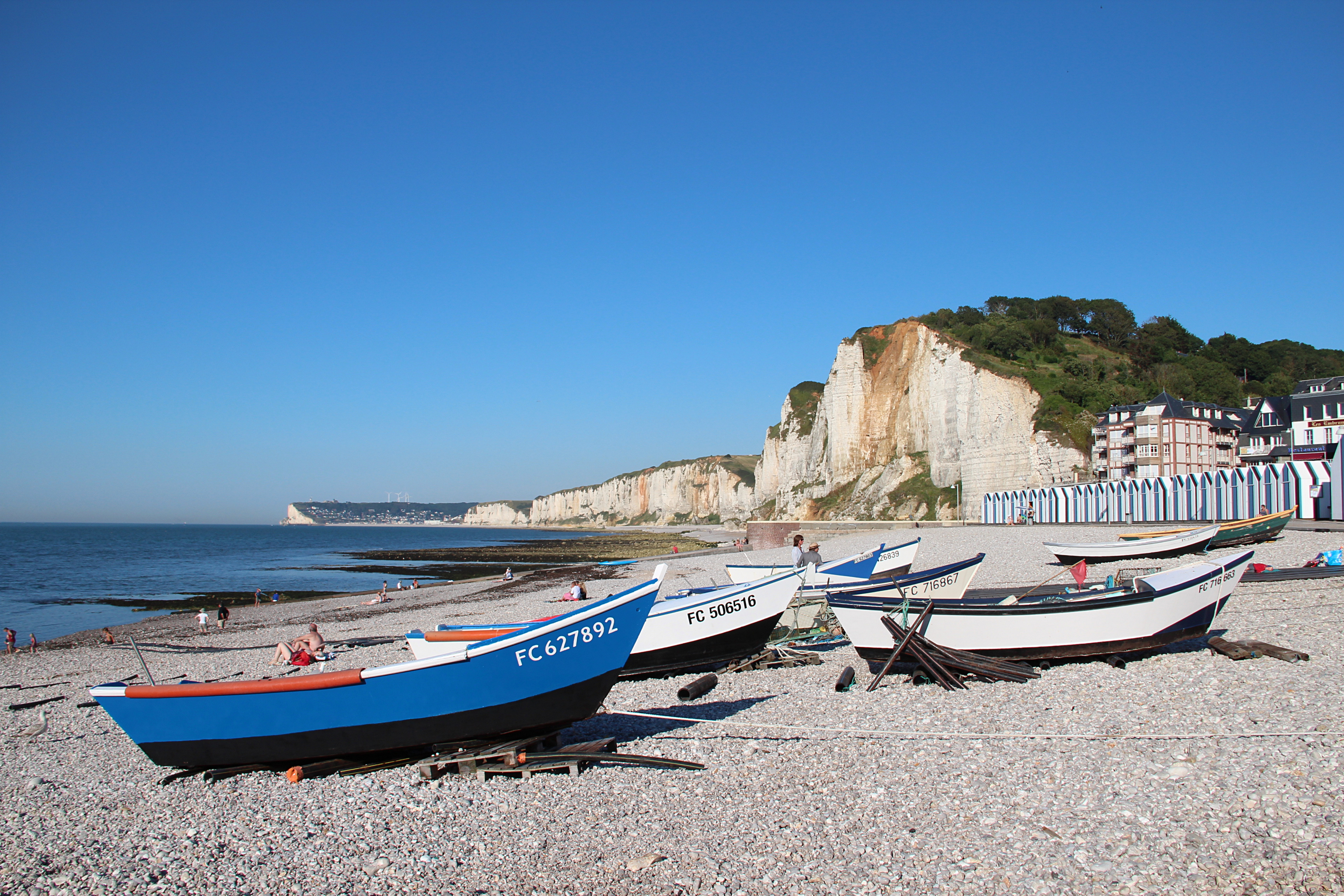
Yport

During the 19th century, sea-bathing came into fashion. In 1849 and 1884, the village was hit by cholera epidemics. In the 1960s, fishing disappeared on the Côte d'Albâtre. Yport is now a tourist town.

=== Heraldry ===
| Arms of Yport | The arms of Yport are blazoned : Tierced per pall, 1: Azure, a ship argent, 2 &3: Or, 3 poplars vert, all around a pall sable; and a chief tierced per pale: 1: Gules, a frog contourny argent, 2: barry argent and gules, a lion sable, 3: Gules, 3 hammers Or. |

== Landmarks and festivals ==
- St. Martin's church
- Torch-light parade on 13 July.
- Festival of the sea and painting on 15 August (mass, blessing, holy procession). An exhibition of paintings, painters and sculptors in the streets and on the beach, auction of art created during the course of the day.

== See also ==
- Communes of the Seine-Maritime department
