= Côte d'Albâtre =

Part of the French coast on the English Channel

Coordinates: 49°46′N 0°22′E

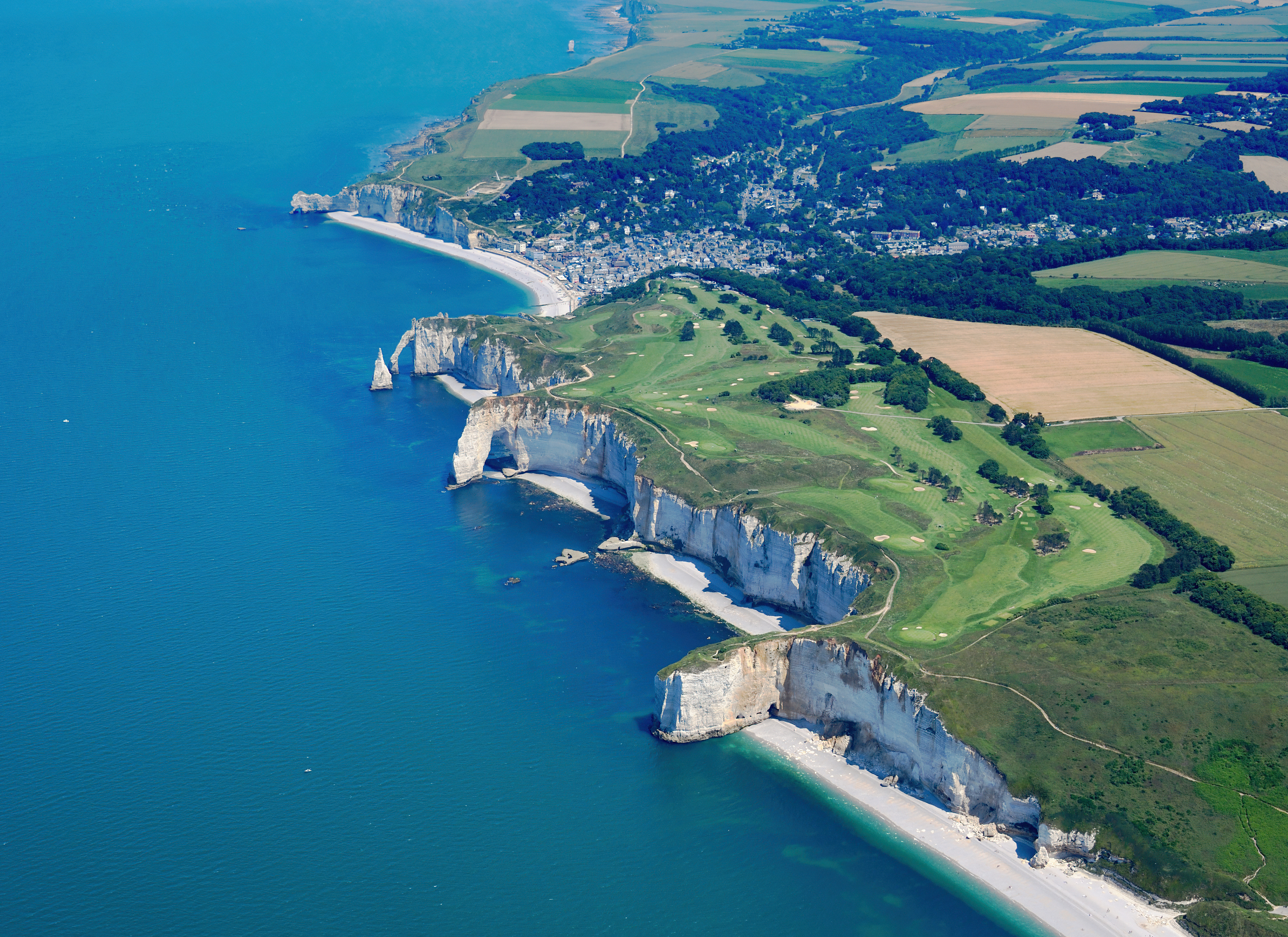
Aerial view of the Cliffs of Étretat

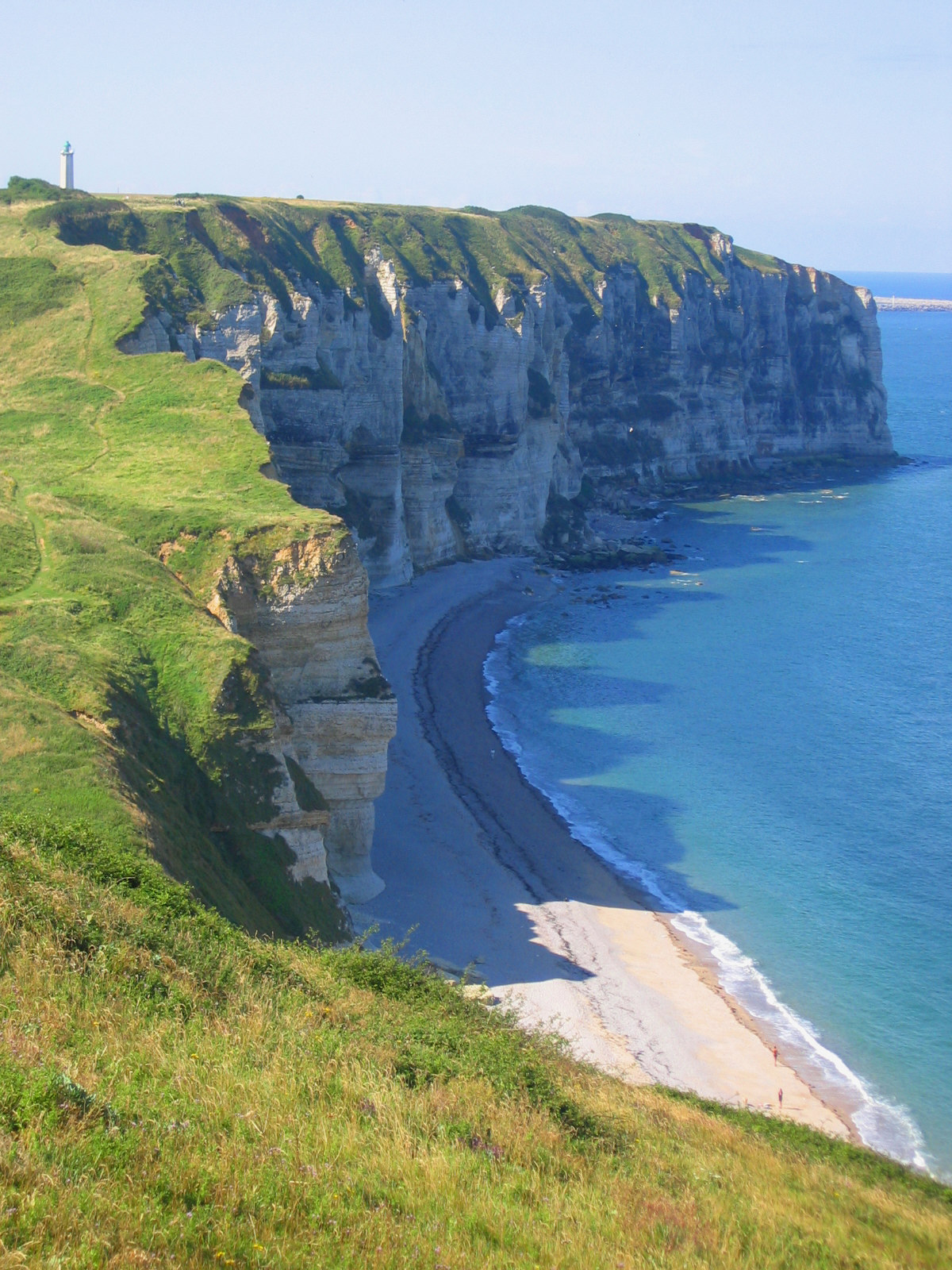
Cliffs of the Côte d'Albâtre at Le Tilleul

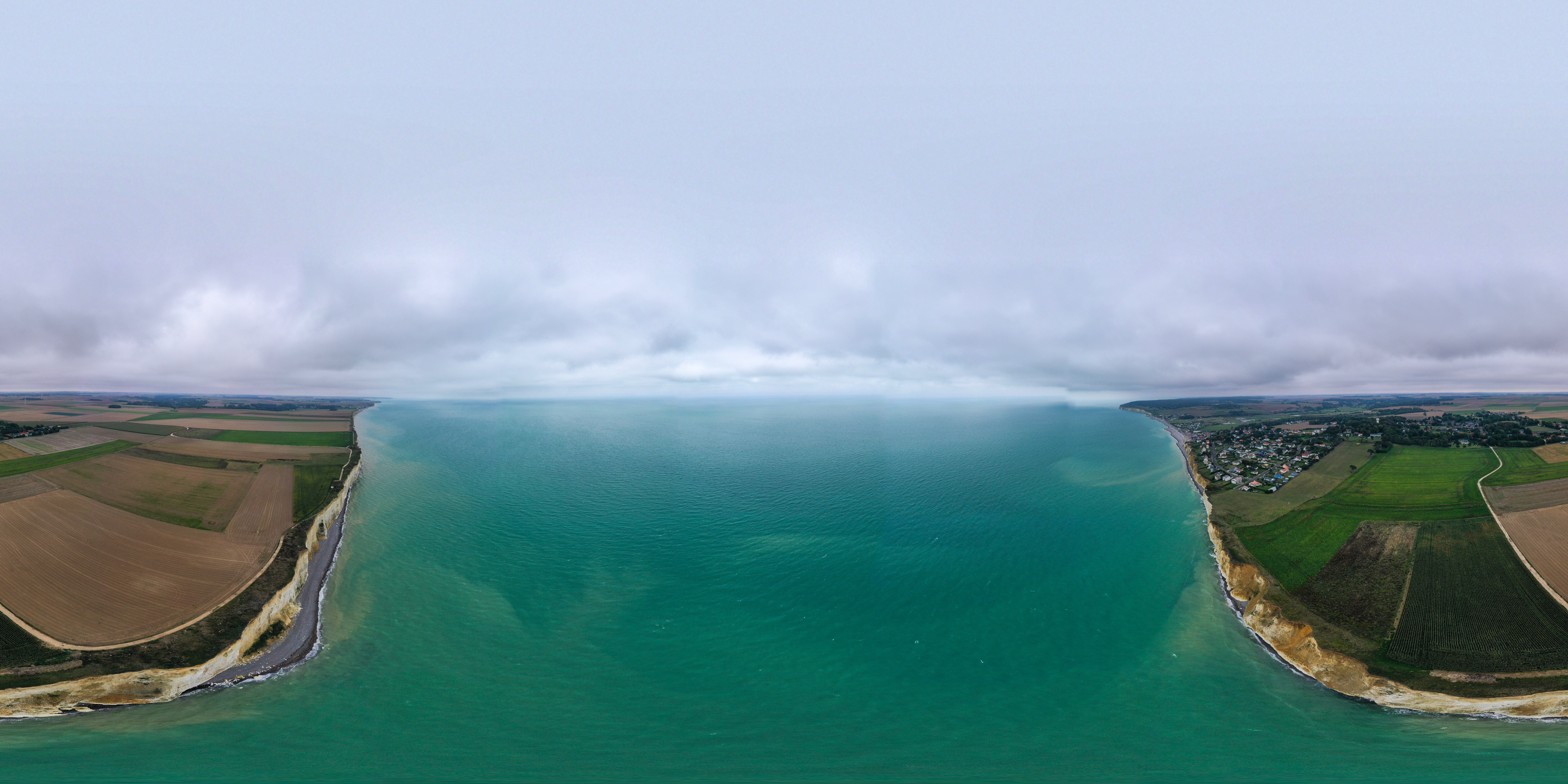
The coast near Quiberville (view as a 360° interactive panorama)

The Côte d'Albâtre (French pronunciation: [kot dalbatʁ]; literally the Alabaster Coast in English) is part of the French coast of the English Channel, corresponding to the coastline of Pays de Caux and forming almost all of the coastline of Seine-Maritime. Since 2009 it has been classified as a Natura 2000 site. It takes its name from the white hue of its high chalk cliffs, including those of Étretat, which stretch for over 120 km, dominating most of the coastline. It is part of the same geological system as the White Cliffs of Dover on the far side of the English Channel.

The Côte runs from the large container port of Le Havre to the small fishing village of Le Tréport, taking in the town of Dieppe, as well as Fécamp (famous for its abbey) and Saint-Valery-en-Caux. Three river valleys punctuate the cliff face, making way for the harbours of Fécamp, sheltering on the Valmont river; Dieppe on the Arques, and Tréport on the Bresle.

Stage 6 of the 2015 Tour de France followed the Côte d'Albâtre for much of its length from Abbeville to Le Havre.

== Artistic, musical and literary associations ==
From Dieppe to Le Havre the coast presents an uninterrupted cliff, about a hundred metres high and straight as a wall. Here and there that great line of white rocks drops sharply and a little, narrow valley, with steep slopes, shaved turf and maritime rushes, comes down from the cultivated plateau towards a beach of shingle where it ends with a ravine like the bed of a torrent. Nature has made these valleys; the rains of storms have ended with them in the shape of these ravines, trimming what was left of the cliff, excavating down to the sea, the bed of waters which acts as a passage for mankind. Sometimes, a village is snuggled into these valleys, where the wind of the open sea is devoured.

— Guy de Maupassant, Le saut du berger ("The Shepherd’s Leap"), originally published in Gil Blas

The Côte d’Albâtre was a favourite subject of Impressionist painters, including Claude Monet, Camille Pissarro and Pierre-Auguste Renoir. It was frequented by composers associated with the sea, such as Claude Debussy and Albert Roussel. Other artists who painted the coastline include Gustave Courbet and Eugène Boudin. Writer Guy de Maupassant grew up on the Côte d'Albâtre at Étretat. His short story "The Englishman of Étretat" (L'Anglais d'Étretat) is based on encounters in 1868 with the English poet Algernon Charles Swinburne, whom he had helped save from drowning. The Clos Lupin Museum features chiefly the famous early 20th-century character Arsène Lupin, a gentleman thief created by writer Maurice Leblanc.
