= Valmont (river) =

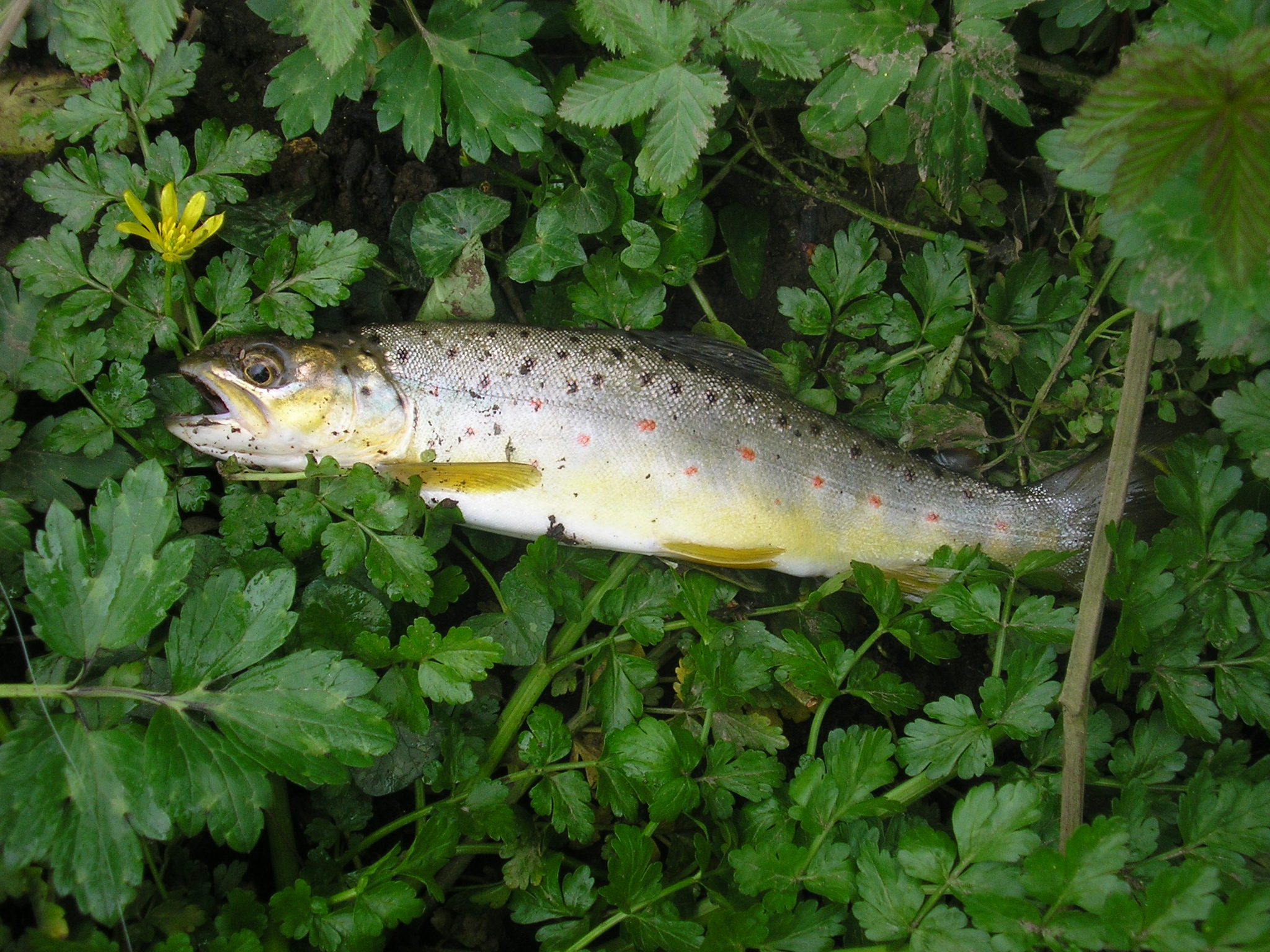
- Brown trout (trutto fario), one of the species of fish found in the Valmont river

Location
- Country: France

Physical characteristics
- Source
  - location: Valmont, Seine-Maritime
- Mouth
  - location: English Channel
  - coordinates: 49°45′53″N 0°21′56″E
- Length: 13.8 km (8.6 mi)

The river Valmont (French pronunciation: [valmɔ̃]) is one of the small rivers that flow from the plateau of the Pays de Caux into the English Channel. It is 13.8 km (8.6 mi) long.

The river rises at an elevation of 56 metres (184 ft) at the commune of Valmont at a place called le Vivier. It takes a northwest orientation and falls by a slope of 2.8%, passing through the commune of Colleville before joining the sea via the port of Fécamp.
