= Fécamp =

- Commune
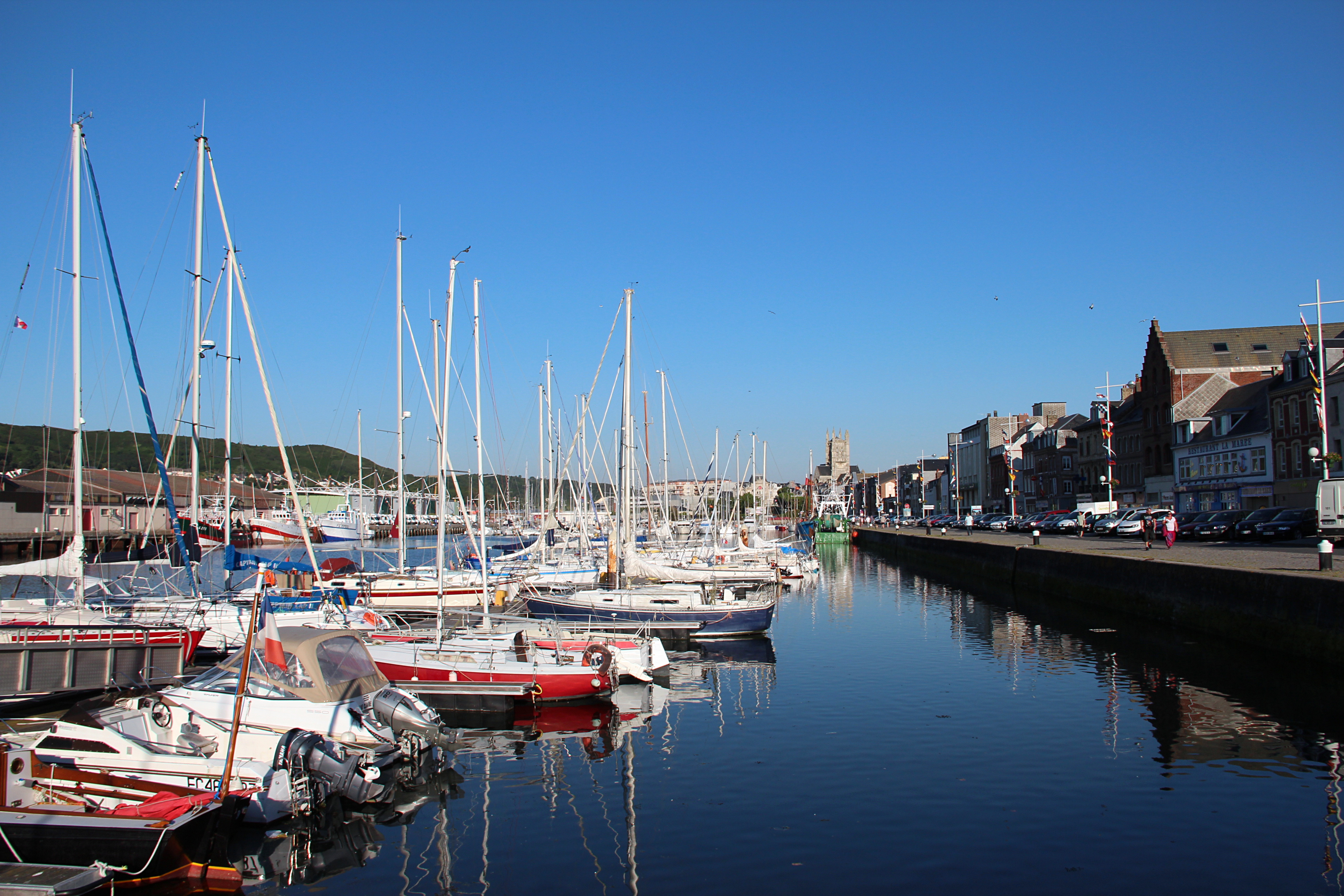
- The port and the city

- Coat of arms
- Location of Fécamp
- Location within France Location within Normandy
- Coordinates: 49°46′N 0°23′E
- Country: France
- Region: Normandy
- Department: Seine-Maritime
- Arrondissement: Le Havre
- Canton: Fécamp
- Intercommunality: CA Fécamp Caux Littoral

Government
  - Mayor (2026–32): David Roussel
- Area^{1}: 15.07 km^{2} (5.82 sq mi)
- Elevation: 14 m (46 ft)
- Highest elevation: 125 m (410 ft)
- Lowest elevation: 0 m (0 ft)
- Population (2023): 17,313
  - Density: 1,149/km^{2} (2,975/sq mi)
- Time zone: UTC+01:00 (CET)
  - Summer (DST): UTC+02:00 (CEST)
- INSEE/Postal code: 76259 /76400
- Website: www.ville-fecamp.fr
- ^{1} French Land Register data, which excludes lakes, ponds, glaciers > 1 km^{2} (0.386 sq mi or 247 acres) and river estuaries.

Fécamp (French pronunciation: [fekɑ̃]) is a commune in the northwestern French department of Seine-Maritime.

== Geography ==
Fécamp is situated in the valley of the river Valmont, at the heart of the Pays de Caux, on the Alabaster Coast. It is around 35 kilometres (22 mi) northeast of Le Havre, and around 60 kilometres (37 mi) northwest of Rouen.

== History ==
=== Origin of the name ===
According to its late medieval founding legend, the trunk of a fig tree (ficus) carrying the Precious Blood of Christ collected by Joseph of Arimathea was washed ashore on the riverbank at Fécamp in the 1st century. Immediately, a fountain of holy blood gushed from the site; the relic attracted many medieval pilgrims, enhancing the reputation of the city.

The monks' legend justified the artificial etymology of the name to Fici-campus, the camp of the fig tree. Fécamp, however, is mentioned in 875 as Fiscannum and in 990 as Fiscannus and as late as 1496 which stem from the Germanic root fisc (English "fish") with an unknown suffix. It used to be the name of the Valmont River.

=== Pre-history ===
The prehistoric site, on the high ground inland from the port of Fécamp, reveals human occupation dating back to Neolithic times. Spreading over 21 hectares, surrounded by walls and ditches for a length of nearly 2000 meters, including a praetorian door. Objects recovered range in date from the Neolithic until Roman times.

=== Roman times ===
Many items of the Gallo-Roman period have been found locally, particularly coins (including two gold Gallic coins found in 1839). A bronze axe, of Celtic design, was unearthed in 1859.

Fécamp was on the ancient road linking Arques-la-Bataille and Lillebonne with the north of Gaul. The archaeological diggings around the Ducal palace (in the grounds of the present abbey) in 1973-1984 revealed some evidence of the La Tène Celtic culture and Gallo-Roman works. Two Gallo-Roman cemeteries have also been discovered.

During Roman times, a road linked Fécamp to Étretat, passing through the present-day village of Fond-Pitron. The current D940 follows the original Roman road.

=== Middle Ages ===
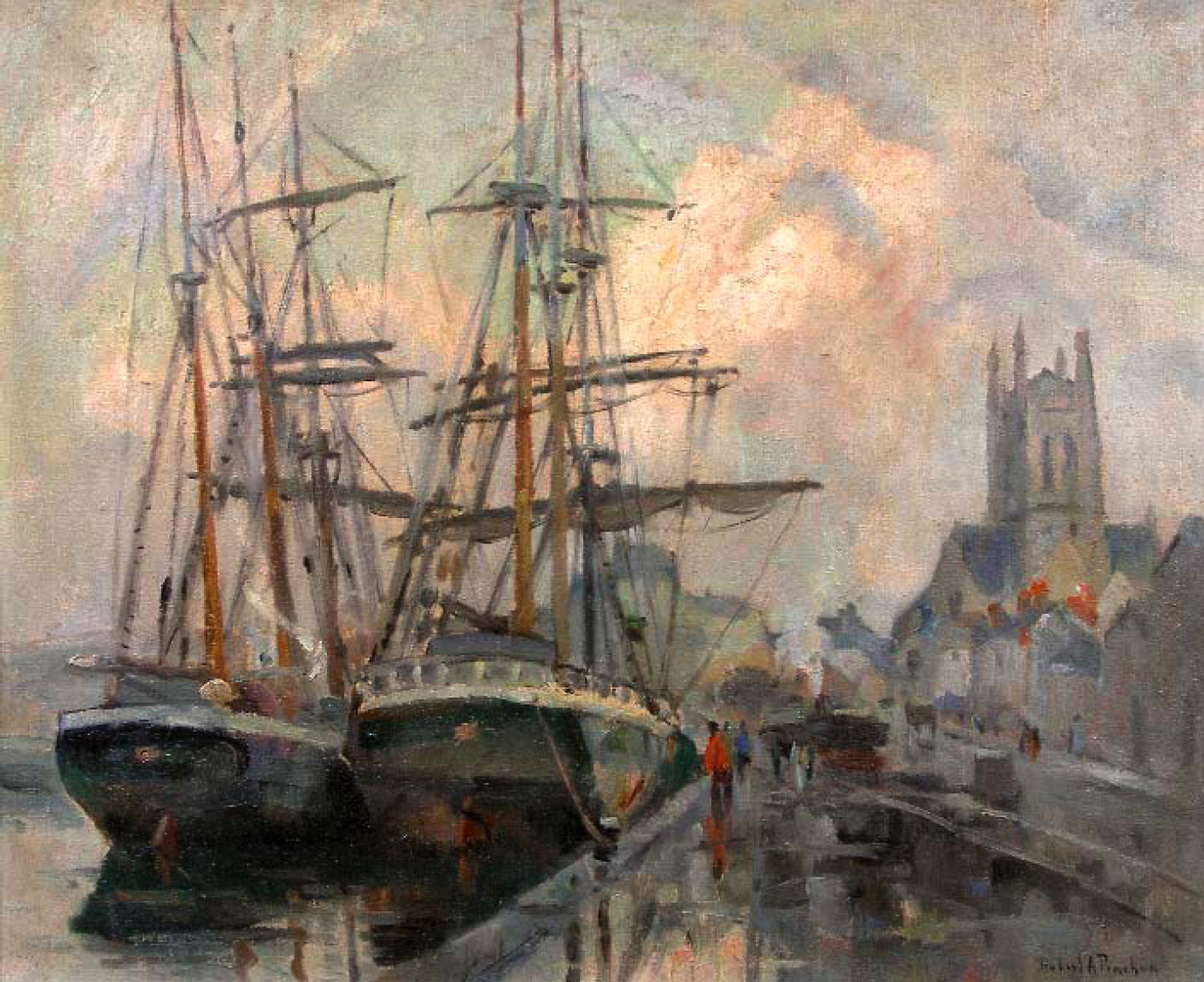
Robert Antoine Pinchon, Le port de Fécamp, oil on canvas, 60 x 73 cm

=== More from the Middle Ages ===
In the 7th century, Saint Leger was exiled to Fécamp. In 932, William I of Normandy (Long-Sword) founded the castle that was to be the residence of the Dukes of Normandy up until 1204, after which the Norman Duchy was integrated within the French royal domain. The castle was the birthplace of many Norman dukes, including Richard I of Normandy (born 933) and Richard II of Normandy (who died 22 August 1027).

In 1202, King John of England granted a community system to Fécamp. In 1410, the English razed the town. In 1449, Fécamp was freed from the English occupation.

For Fécamp, the French Wars of Religion ended in July 1593, when Captain de Bois-Rosé rallied the city to Henry IV of France after his conversion to Catholicism. It was at Fécamp that Charles II of England landed, on 16 October 1651, soon after the Battle of Worcester, where he had been finally defeated by Cromwell.

=== Modern era ===
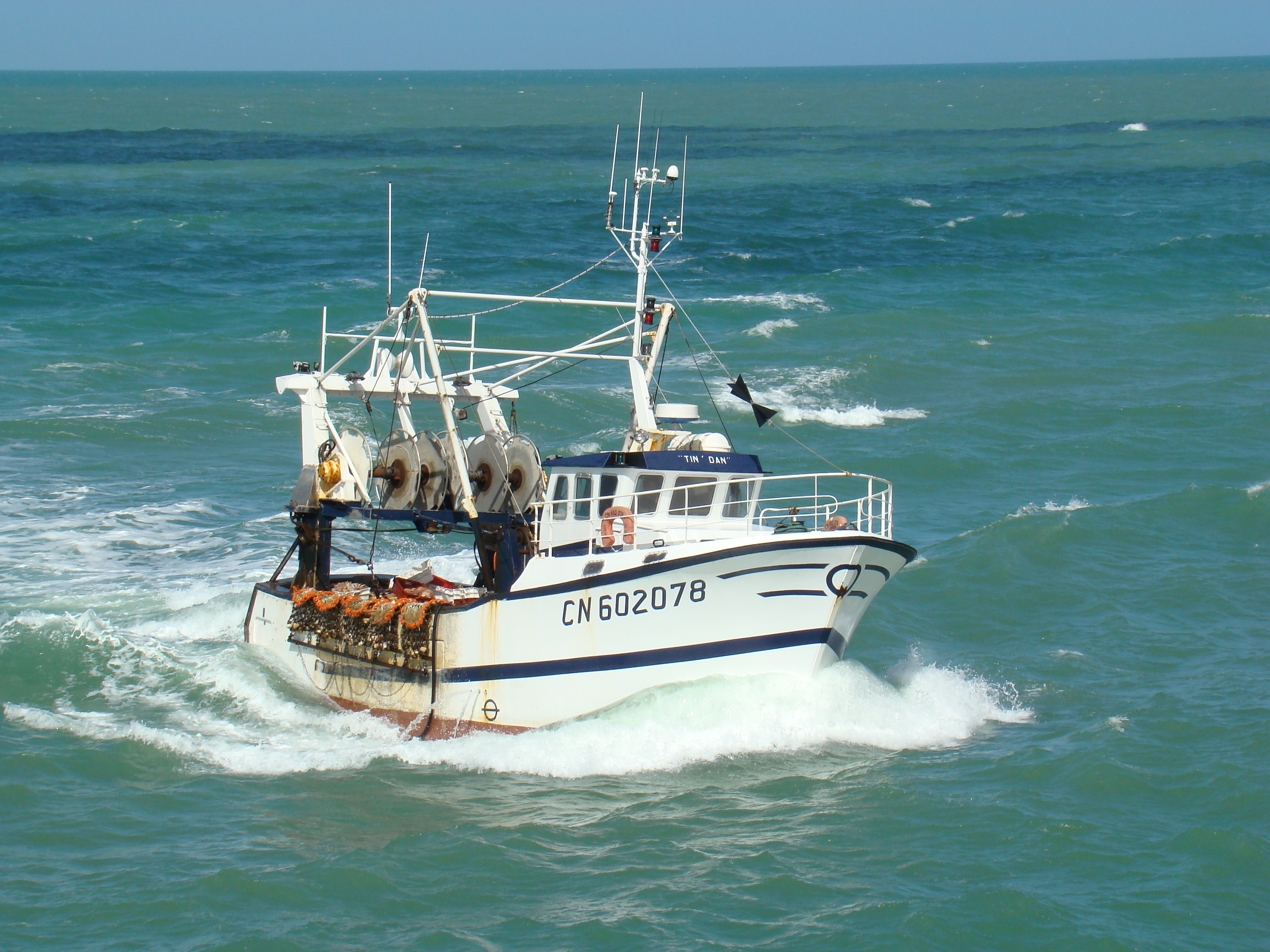
A fishing boat returns to port

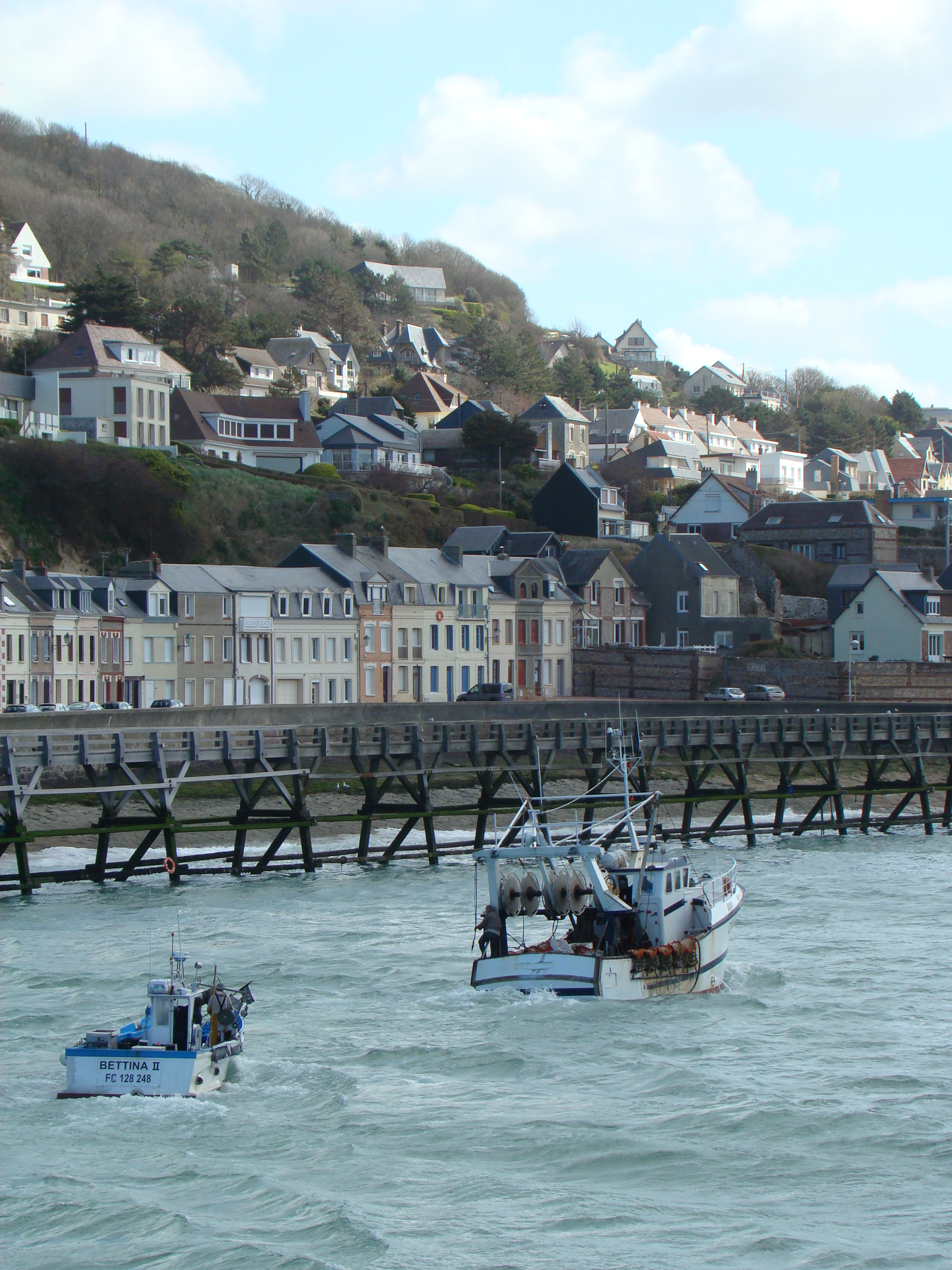
Fishing boats return to port

The history of Fécamp has always revolved around the fishing industry and its harbour (first mentioned in the 11th century). The reputation of the salt-herrings of Fécamp was established as early as the 10th century, that of smoked herrings from the 13th century. An association of whale fishermen was created in the 11th century. Fishing for cod started commercially in the 16th century, under the impetus of Nicolas Selles, an early shipping magnate. Throughout the 19th century and the early part of the 20th century, Fécamp had an important role as the chief fishing port in France for cod and cod-related fish. This was the case up until the 1970s, when Canada stopped all access to their fishing grounds. First practiced by three-masted sailing ships, Atlantic fishing trips could last more than six months, the time taken to fill the hold with cod, which were salted to preserve them.

The fishing was actually carried out in small boats, carrying only two or three fishermen. Many of these small boats would be lost in the fog and never returned to the ship. As technology evolved, the three-mast boats disappeared, giving way to steamers, then to diesel-engined vessels. These days, only a small fishing fleet survives, restricted to fishing around coastal waters. In the harbour, pleasure-boats have taken the place of all but a few fishing-boats.

- In the 19th century, the recipe for Bénédictine liqueur was “rediscovered” by Alexandre Legrand. The Palais Bénédictine now houses a visitors’ centre, which shows how the liqueur is made.
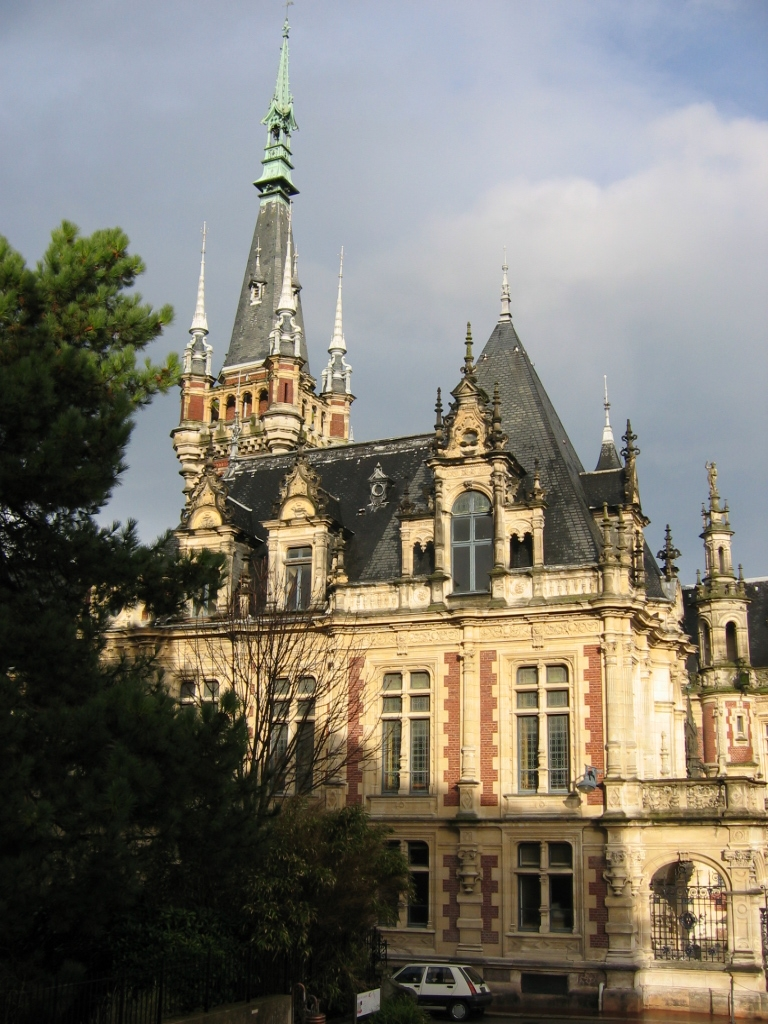
Palais de la Bénédictine

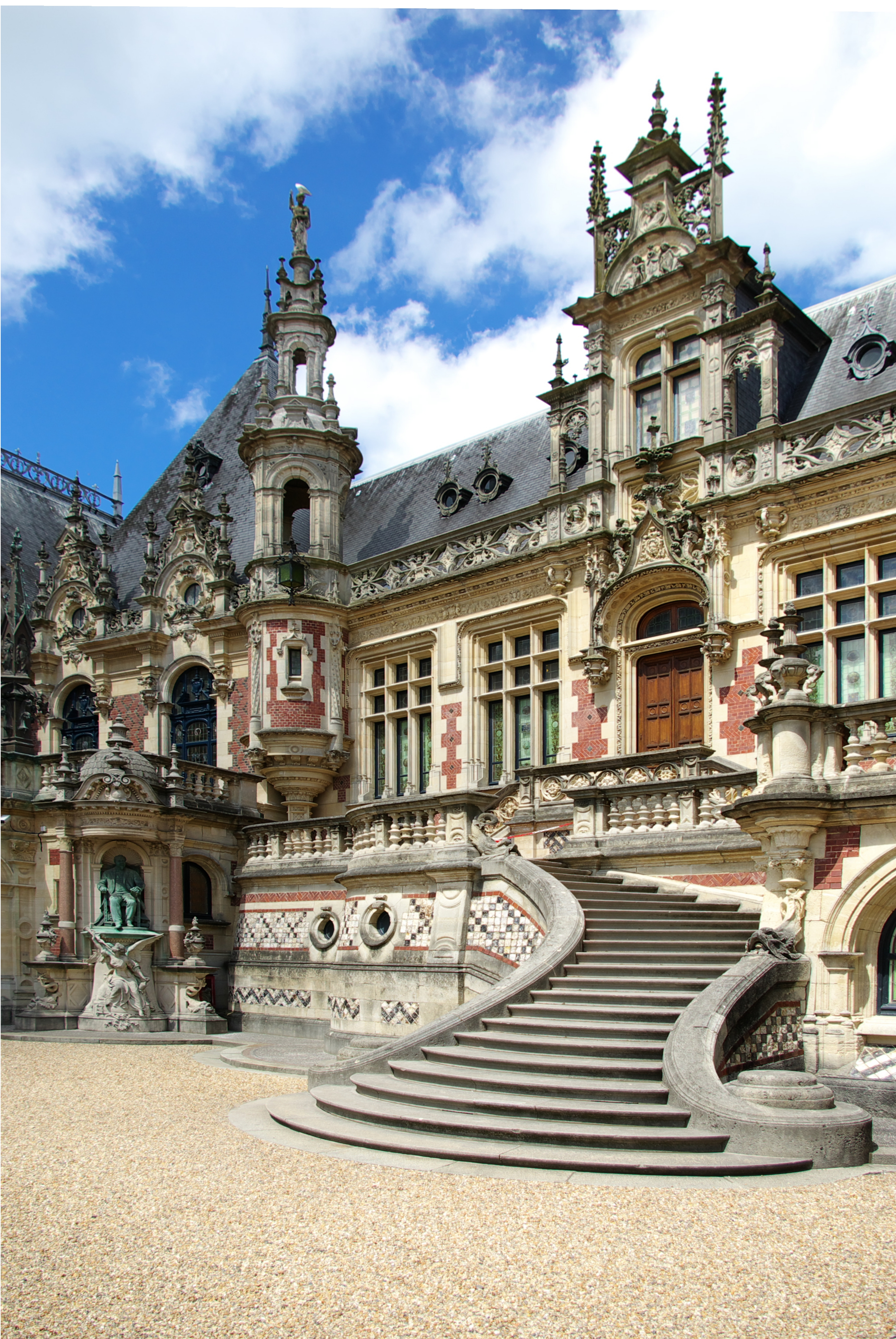
The Bénédictine Palace

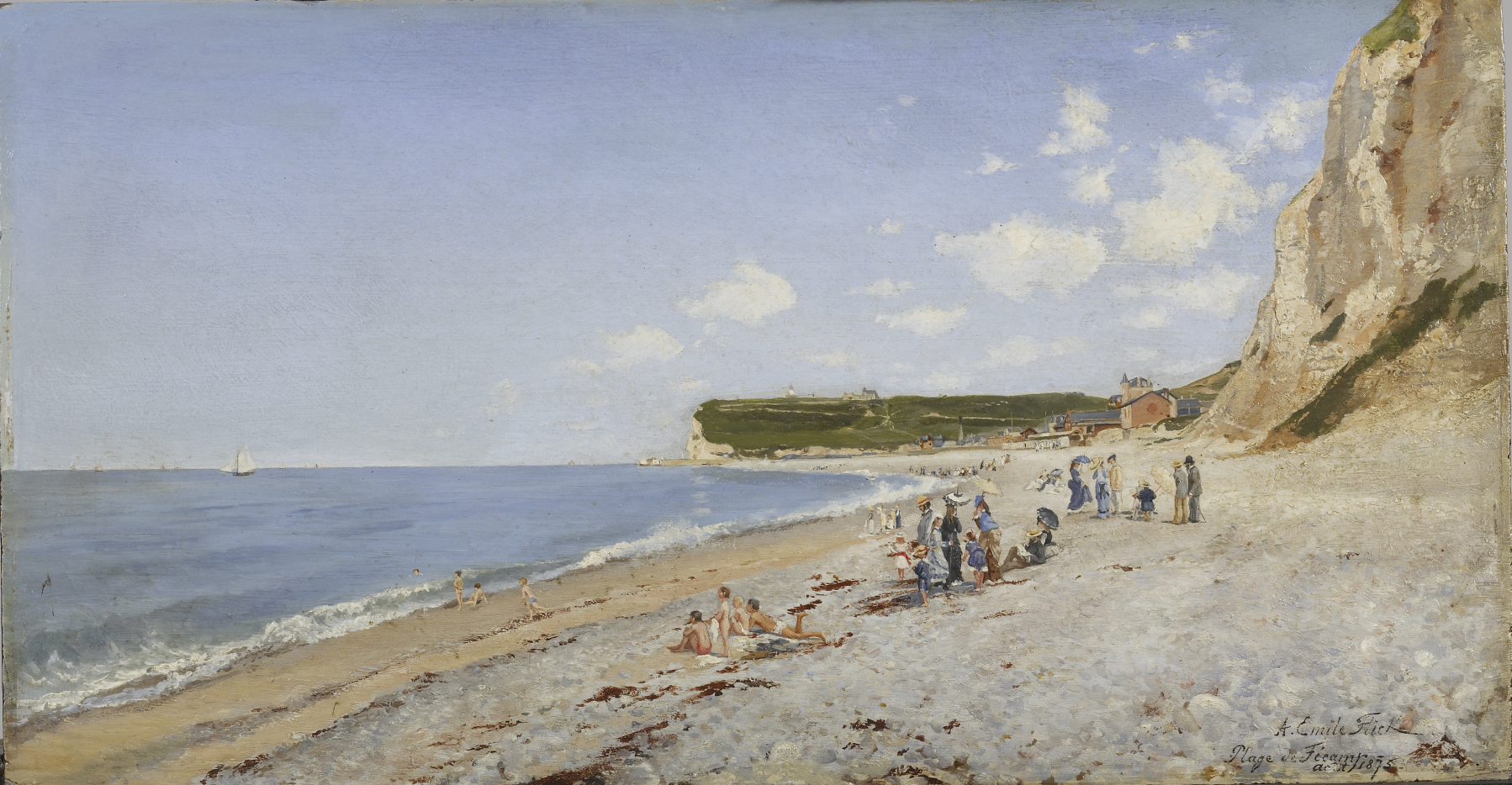
Auguste-Émile Flick, The Beach at Fécamp (1875). The Walters Art Museum

=== Heraldry ===
Arms of Fécamp	The arms of Fécamp are blazoned : 3 silver tents with open entrances on a field of green, and on a blue sky, a silver falcon taking off with a cornucopia in its talons, from which grain falls onto the field.

== Population ==
Historical population
Year	Pop.	±% p.a.
1968	21,406	—
1975	21,910	+0.33%
1982	21,436	−0.31%
1990	20,808	−0.37%
1999	21,027	+0.12%
2007	19,169	−1.15%
2012	19,262	+0.10%
2017	18,641	−0.65%
2023	17,313	−1.22%
Source: INSEE

== Education ==
Fécamp has four high schools:

- Anita Conti professional high school
- Providence high school, a private high school situated in the city centre.
- Descartes professional high school, situated in the school complex at Saint-Jacques
- Guy de Maupassant high school, also at Saint-Jacques

== Civil architecture ==
- 12th – 14th century ruins of the ducal former palace enclosed in the abbey grounds – two towers and a wall section
- Remains of the fort of Bourg-Baudouin, on the approach to Notre-Dame-du-Salut
- Bénédictine Palace, ruined buildings of the Benedictine abbey.
- Former mill of the 18th century.
- The Town hall, a Louis XVI style building
- Former hostelry of the du Grand Cerf, 16th century
- Courtyard de la Maîtrise with 11th–12th-century tower.
- Old houses in the neighbourhood of the Hallettes, of which two houses are 16th century: Numbers 21 and 73 Rue Arquaise and 6, Rue de la Voûte (built with reclaimed materials from the abbey palace)
- Water Tower 13th century
- Épinay farm, 16th century, former country retreat of a religious order

== Church architecture ==
- Church of the Trinity: Primitive Norman Gothic style, constructed from 1175 to 1220 with some Roman traces. Lantern tower from the 12th century; Façade - 18th century; Porch - 13th century; choir - 14th-15th century; Chapel of the Virgin 16th century with 13th-century stained-glass windows; Organ from 1746, originating from the Montivilliers Abbey; Group of multi-coloured stone from the 15th century; 16th century balustrades and tombs of the Dukes of Normandy of the 13th–14th centuries.
- Abbey of the Trinity: Traces of former buildings: cloisters, a former mill, tower de la Maîtrise
- Saint-Étienne’s church: 16th century flamboyant Gothic porch and south transept from 1500, facade and tower from the 19th century; wooden statues and pulpit 17th-18th century.
- Chapel Notre-Dame-du-Salut: Originally 14th century, on a cliff: Rebuilt in the 17th century; a gilded statue of the Virgin on the roof.
- Chapel of the Precious Blood: Rebuilt in stone in the 17th century, covering the miraculous source of the "Precious Blood".
- Three other religious communities
- Protestant church

== Museums ==
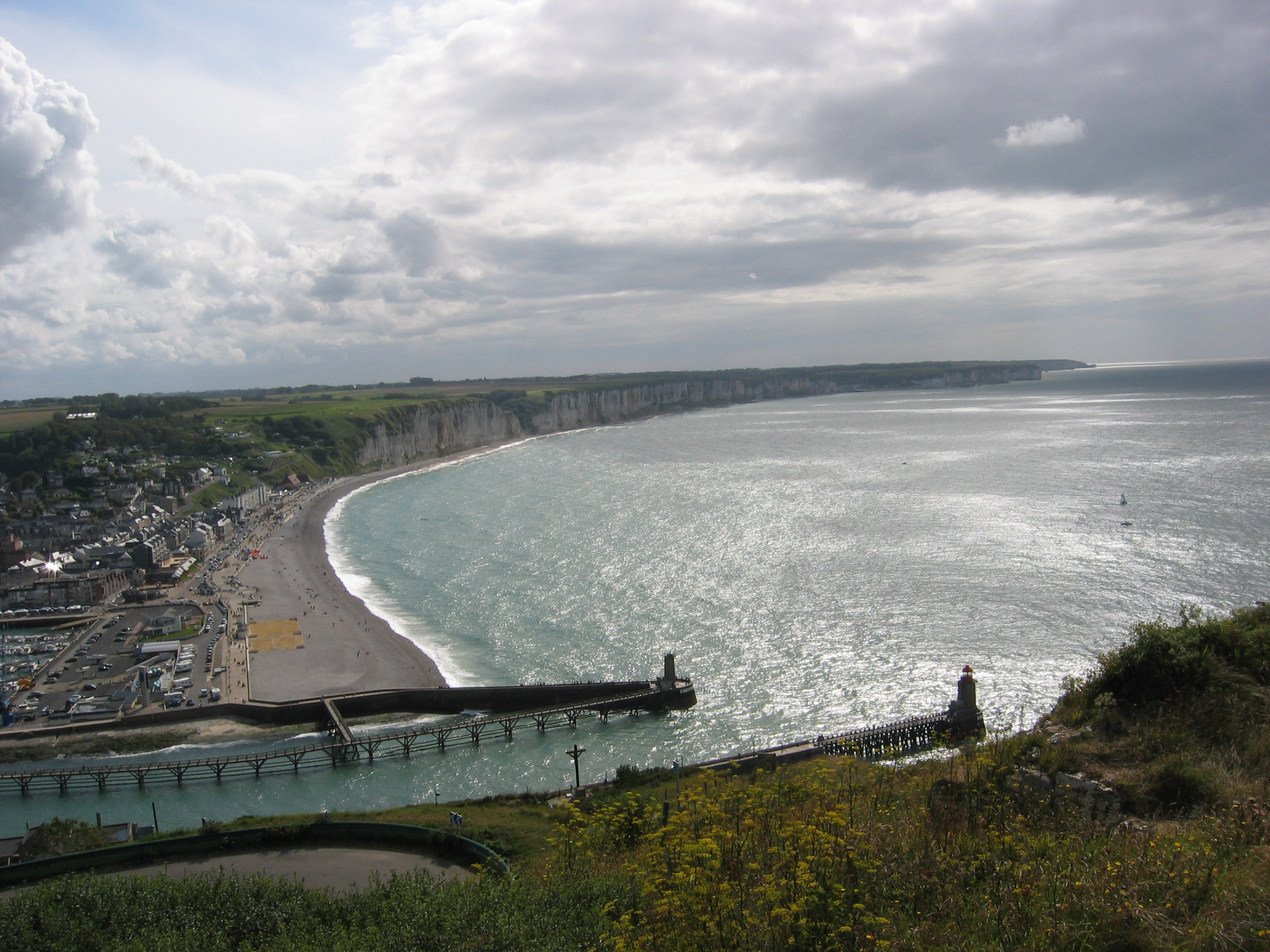
The sea, from Notre-Dame-de-Salut

- Municipal Museum: Earthenware, glassware, 18th and 19th century paintings, archeology, religious art and maritime folklore.
- Benedictine Palace Museum: Objects of religious art from the 12th – 18th century (some of the collection originates from the former abbey); 14th – 18th century metalwork; Benedictine liquor manufacturing equipment for distillation etc.
- Museum of Arts et de l'Enfance: Gallo-Roman objects found in the 19th century explaining man's beginnings in Fécamp.
- Museum Terre-Neuvas et de la Pêche (Newfoundland and Fishing): Museum of Fécamp's glorious maritime past, inaugurated in 1988 but closed in 2012 to be integrated in the new "Musée des Pêcheries". The adventures of the cod-fishermen that left for long months in the icy waters of Newfoundland (boats, models, equipment), construction and naval repair, architectural model of the city, audio-visual events and exhibitions of painting (annual display of naval painting)
- Musée du chocolat: Chocolate discovery museum
- Visits to the watercress beds
- Maison du patrimoine (Heritage house) Built and furnished as in the 16th century. Since 2005, the municipal archives have been stored here
- Villa Émilie, Art Nouveau style house from the end of the 19th century
- Musée des Pêcheries (inaugurated in December 2017) : Museum that gathers together the municipal collections. It includes: art and history items, ethnographic items linked to fishing and sailors, and the Doctor Dufour's childhood collection. The museum occupies a historical building, a former fish factory which have been partly transformed to welcome the collections. It has been completed with a roof extension that gives a 360 view on Fécamp's port.

== Sites ==
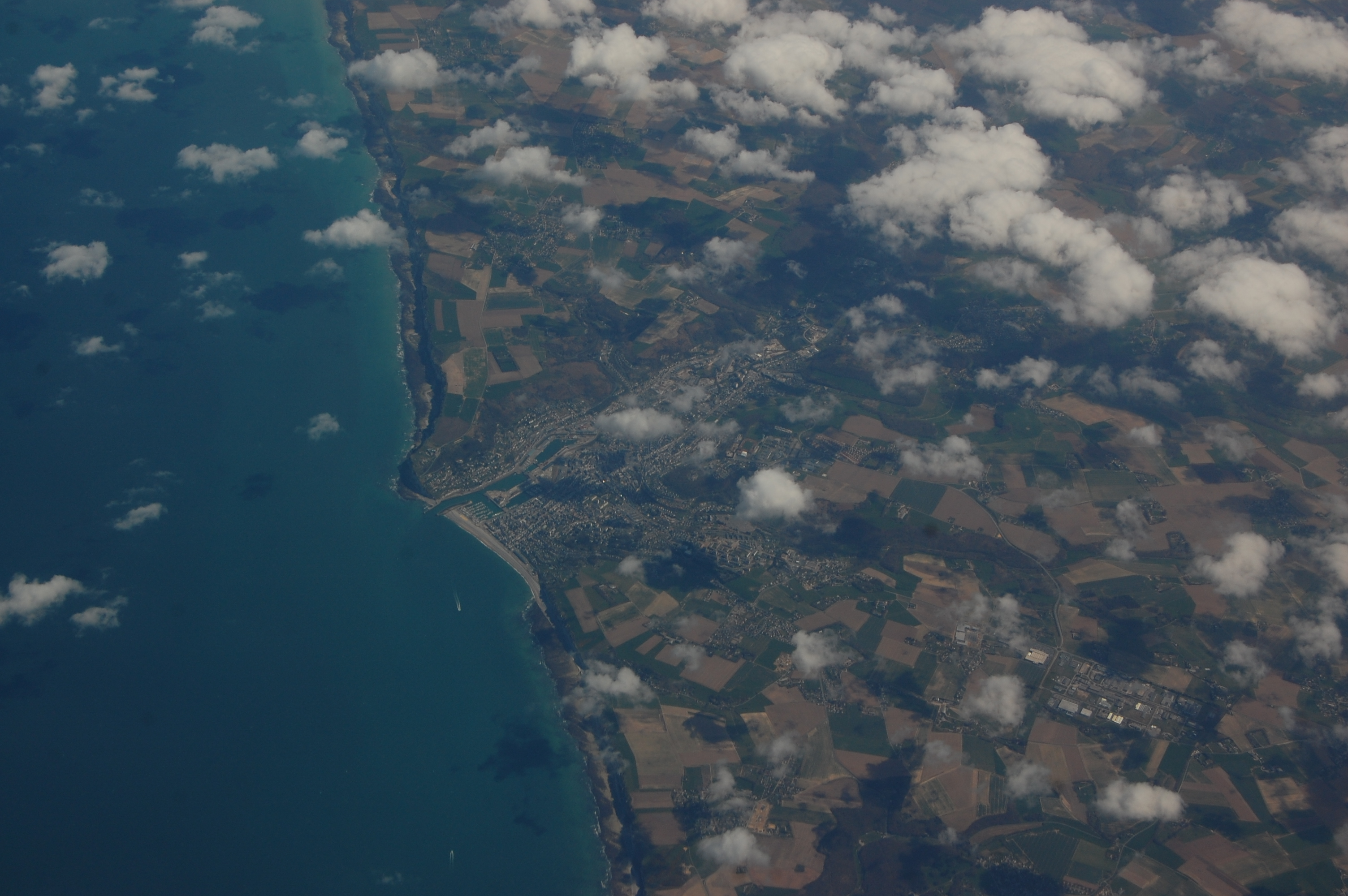
Fécamp from the air

- Panorama from Notre-Dame-de-Salut: Orientation table
- Pebble beach
- Cliffs

== People associated with Fécamp ==
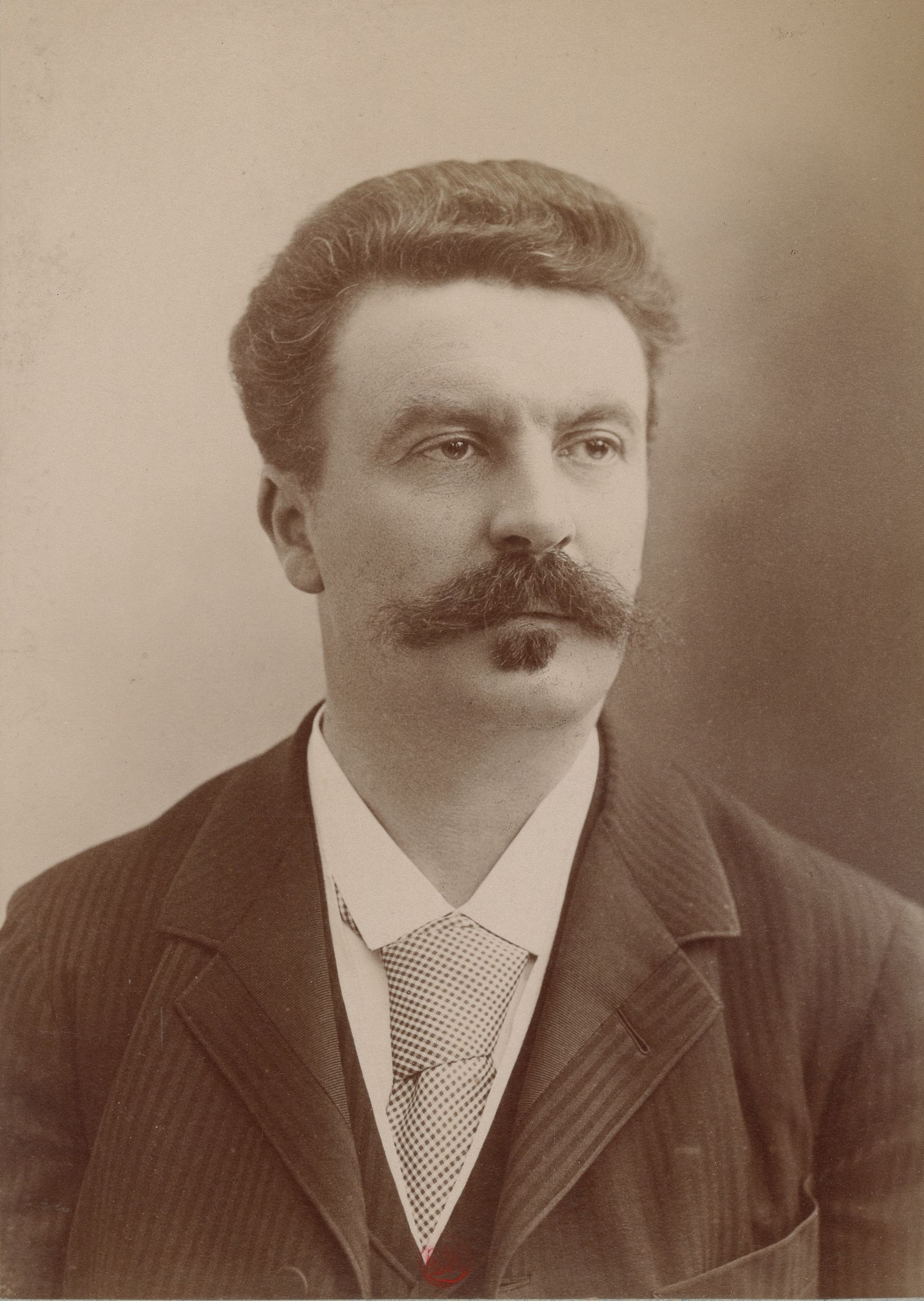
Guy de Maupassant

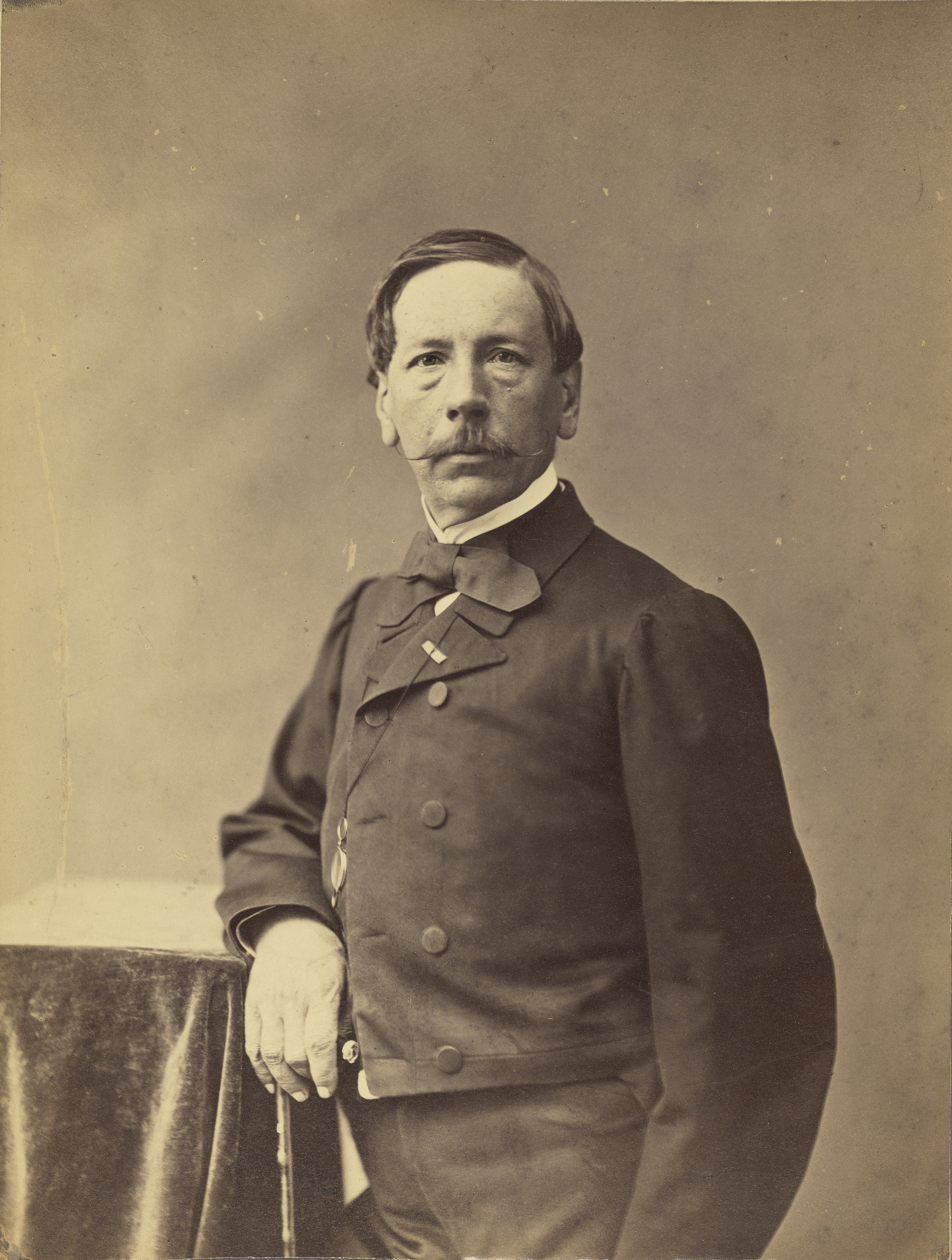
Eugène Lepoittevin

- Jean Accart, World War II fighter pilot – born in Fécamp
- David Belle (1973), creator of Parkour
- Pierre Carron (1932), sculptor and painter
- Louis-Armand Chardin (1755–1793), baritone and composer
- Étienne Chicot, comedian, born in Fécamp
- Remigius de Fécamp, first bishop of Lincoln
- Raoul Dufy (1877–1953), Fauvist painter
- Guy Dupré (born 1928), writer - born in Fécamp
- Edward the Confessor, exiled to Fécamp.
- Gustave Lambert, explorer
- Alexandre Legrand, industrialist, “rediscovered” Bénédictine
- René Legros, inventor, born in Fécamp
- Eugène Lepoittevin, painter
- Louis Levacher (1934–1983), sculptor and painter
- Jean Lorrain, writer was born in Fécamp (9 August 1855)
- Jacques Mazoyhie, ship owner
- Guy de Maupassant, once lived in Fécamp.
- Tony Parker, French basketball player (played one year with Fécamp)
- Bella Pochez, resistance member, murdered in Auschwitz
- Philippe Porée-Kurrer (1954), writer
- Richard I of Normandy (933-996)
- Paul Vasselin, politician
- Wace, writer – stayed in Fécamp.
- William of Volpiano, religious reformer - buried in Fécamp in 1031

== Twin towns and sister cities ==
- Mouscron, Belgium
- Putnok, Hungary
- Rheinfelden, Germany
- Vale of Glamorgan, Wales, United Kingdom

== See also ==
- Sébastien et la Mary-Morgane
