= Battle of Valmont =

Battle during the Hundred Years' War

- Part of the Hundred Years' War (Lancastrian phase)
| Date | 9 and 11 March 1416 |
| Location | around Valmont and Harfleur 49°44′38″N 0°30′52″E |
| Result | Inconclusive; see result |

Belligerents
| Kingdom of England | Kingdom of France |

Commanders and leaders
| Thomas Beaufort | Bernard of Armagnac |

Strength
| Beaufort: 1,000; Harfleur garrison: 1,200 | 4,000 |

Casualties and losses
| 160 (on the first day) | 1,000 |

The Battle of Valmont is the name given to two connected actions which took place between 9 and 11 March 1416 in the area of the towns of Valmont and Harfleur in Normandy. A raiding force under Thomas Beaufort, Earl of Dorset, was confronted by a larger French army under Bernard VII, Count of Armagnac at Valmont. The initial action went against the English, who lost their horses and baggage. They managed to rally and withdraw in good order to Harfleur, only to find the French had cut them off. A second action now took place, during which the French army was defeated with the aid of a sally from the English garrison of Harfleur.

== The forces engaged ==
=== English ===
In January 1416, 900 men-at-arms and 1500 archers arrived to reinforce the garrison at Harfleur, which had been captured in the previous September following a siege. Dorset took 1000–1100 of these men on his raid. The force consisted of both men-at-arms and archers.

=== French ===
D'Armagnac had brought a force of 2,000 men-at-arms and 1,000 archers with him from Gascony in January 1416. He could also call upon local garrisons and militias. Rouen sent him 600 men-at-arms and 50 crossbowmen. His overall force at Valmont was approximately 4,000 men.

== The initial action near Valmont ==
Dorset marched out on his raid on 9 March. He looted and burnt several villages, reaching as far as Cany-Barville. The English then turned for home. They were intercepted near Valmont by the French. The English had time to form a fighting line, placing their horses and baggage to the rear, before the French launched a mounted attack. The French cavalry broke through the thin English line but, instead of turning to finish the English, charged on to loot the baggage and steal horses. This allowed Dorset, who had been wounded, to rally his men and lead them to a small hedged garden nearby, which they defended till nightfall. The French withdrew to Valmont for the night, rather than stay in the field, and this allowed Dorset to lead his men off under the cover of darkness to take shelter in woods at Les Loges. English casualties at this stage of the battle were estimated at 160 killed.

== The second action near Harfleur ==
The following day, the English struck out for the coast. They moved down onto the beach and began the long march across the shingle to Harfleur. However, as they neared Harfleur, they saw that a French force was awaiting them on the cliffs above. The English deployed in line and the French attacked down the steep slope. The French were disordered by the descent and were defeated, leaving many dead. As the English looted the corpses, the main French army came up. This force did not attack, instead forming up on the high ground, forcing the English to attack. This they successfully did, forcing the French back. The retreating French then found themselves attacked in the flank by the sallying garrison of Harfleur and retreat turned to rout. The French are said to have lost 200 men killed and 800 captured in this action. D'Armagnac later had a further 50 hanged for fleeing from the battle.

== An act of defiance ==
The battle of Valmont was remembered afterwards by English chroniclers for an act of defiance. At some point in the battle (Burne places it when the English were defending the garden, Strickland before the initial battle) D'Armangnac is said to have offered Dorset terms of surrender. Men-at-arms would be made prisoner but archers would have their right hands cut off. Dorset is said to have replied to the French herald "Tell your master that Englishmen do not surrender".

== Result ==
Unsurprisingly, chroniclers were divided in their view of who actually won the Battle of Valmont and modern historians are no more unanimous. Alfred Burne spoke of the "achievement of this devoted little band of English soldiers" as "epic" and his view is echoed by Matthew Strickland. Newhall, however, felt the overall result was "satisfying" to the French and Juliet Barker describes it as a "disastrous occasion" for the English. Perhaps the most balanced summary is given by Wylie:

"It is true that the Earl of Dorset had extricated himself from a deadly trap with wonderful nerve and pluck, yet his foolhardy adventure had cost him immensely dear in men, horses and material".

== See also ==
- Reign of King Henry V told by John Strecche, Canon of Kenilworth
