= Valmont, Seine-Maritime =

Valmont
- Commune
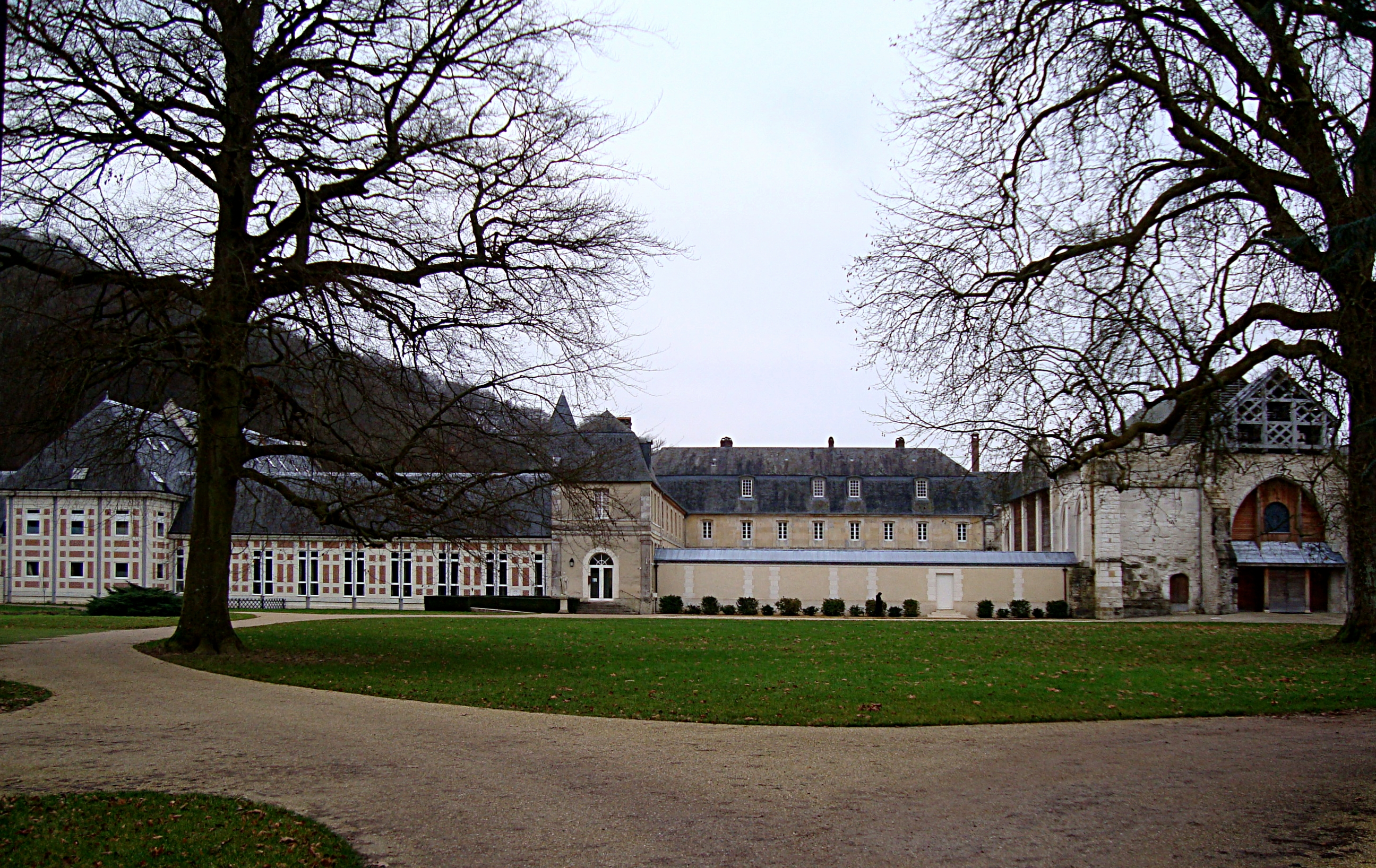
- Valmont Abbey

- Coat of arms
- Location of Valmont
- Location within France Location within Normandy
- Coordinates: 49°44′38″N 0°30′52″E
- Country: France
- Region: Normandy
- Department: Seine-Maritime
- Arrondissement: Le Havre
- Canton: Fécamp
- Intercommunality: CA Fécamp Caux Littoral

Government
  - Mayor (2026–32): Jean-Louis Navarre
- Area^{1}: 5.55 km^{2} (2.14 sq mi)
- Elevation: 37 m (121 ft)
- Highest elevation: 123 m (404 ft)
- Lowest elevation: 35 m (115 ft)
- Population (2023): 849
  - Density: 153/km^{2} (396/sq mi)
- Time zone: UTC+01:00 (CET)
  - Summer (DST): UTC+02:00 (CEST)
- INSEE/Postal code: 76719 /76540
- ^{1} French Land Register data, which excludes lakes, ponds, glaciers > 1 km^{2} (0.386 sq mi or 247 acres) and river estuaries.

Valmont (French pronunciation: [valmɔ̃]) is a commune in the Seine-Maritime department in the Normandy region in northern France.

== Geography ==
A farming village in the Pays de Caux, situated some 32 miles (51 km) northeast of Le Havre, at the junction of the D10, D17, D28 and D69 roads. The village is surrounded by woodland. Just outside the village, at Le Vivier, is the source of the river Valmont.

== History ==
The commune was created in 1822 and 1825 by the merger of four former parishes of Valmont, Saint-Ouen-au-Bosc, Rouxmesnil and Le Bec-au-Cauchois.
In 1169, the abbey of Notre-Dame-du-Pre was founded here by Nicolas of Estouteville. It was devastated during the Hundred Years' War but was repaired and became a nunnery. In 1416 the Battle of Valmont took place near the town, as part of the Hundred Years' War.

== Population ==
Historical population
Year	Pop.	±% p.a.
1968	818	—
1975	868	+0.85%
1982	860	−0.13%
1990	875	+0.22%
1999	1,010	+1.61%
2007	989	−0.26%
2012	976	−0.26%
2017	847	−2.80%
2023	849	+0.04%
Source: INSEE

== Places of interest ==
- The ruins of Notre-Dame abbey, dating from the twelfth century.
- The church of St. Nicolas.
- The chateau of Estouteville, dating from the eleventh century with a donjon and a large public park.
- Les Petites Dalles, a seaside resort

== People ==
- The naturalist Georges Cuvier was a tutor and secretary from 1791 to 1794 at Fiquainville chateau.
- Eugène Delacroix, artist, spent some time at Valmont. Here he painted the Ruines de l'abbaye de Valmont, which nowadays hangs in the Louvre.

== See also ==
- Communes of the Seine-Maritime department
