= Pays de Caux =

Area in Normandy

Coordinates: 49°40′N 00°30′E

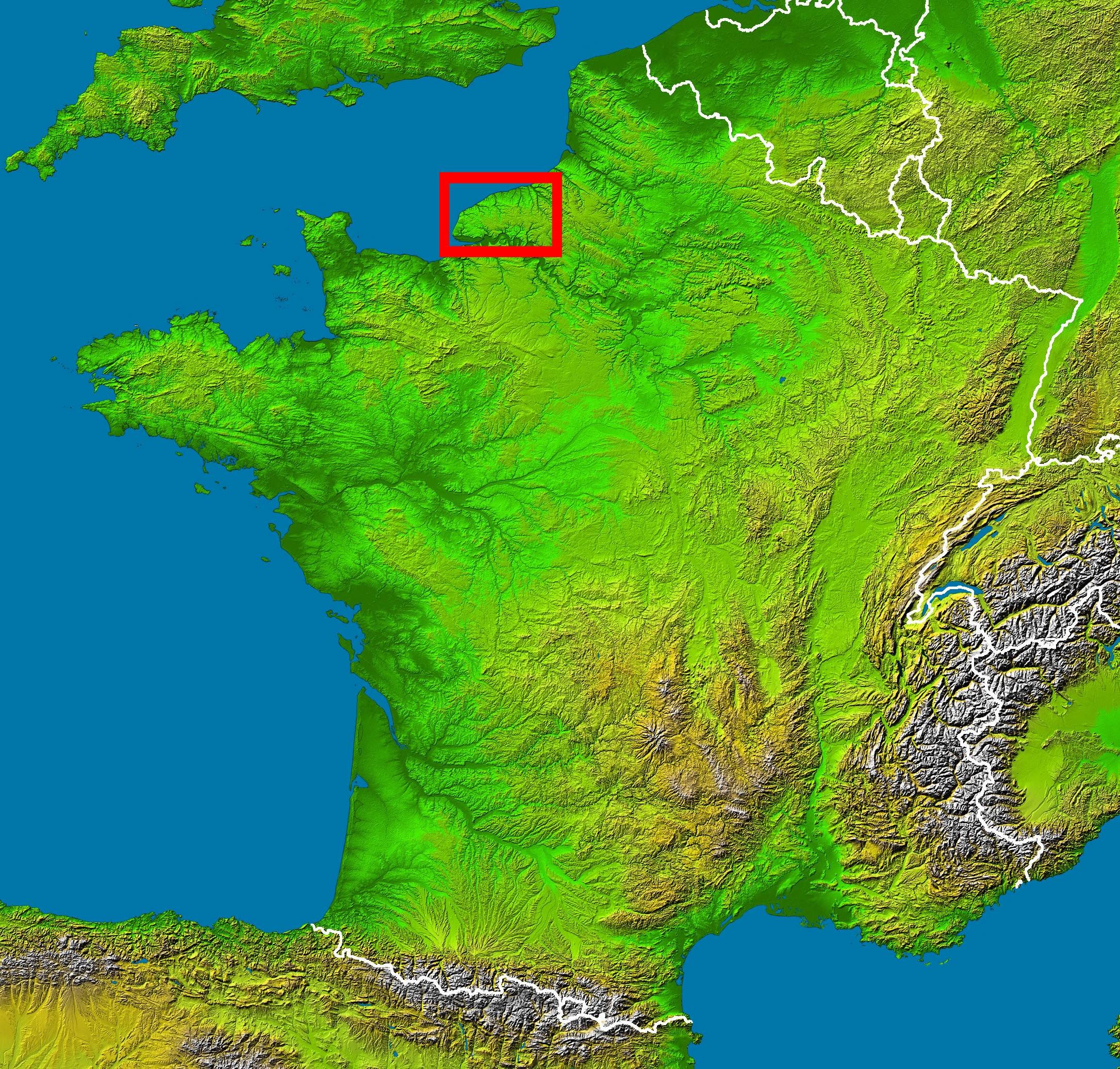
Location within France

The Pays de Caux (/ˈpeɪ də koʊ/, French pronunciation: [pei də ko], literally Land of Caux) is an area in Normandy occupying the greater part of the French département of Seine Maritime in Normandy. It is a chalk plateau to the north of the Seine Estuary and extending to the cliffs on the English Channel coast; its coastline is known as the Côte d'Albâtre. In the east, it borders on the Pays de Bray where the strata below the chalk show through.

Cauchois is a notable dialect of the Norman language. The Pays de Caux is one of the remaining strongholds of the Norman language outside the Cotentin (or Cherbourg) peninsula.

The principal communities are Le Havre, Dieppe, Fécamp, Yvetot, and Étretat.

== Etymology ==
In the Norman language caux means lime, calcium carbonate. In French, for comparison, the word is chaux (the French 'ch' being pronounced as an English 'sh'. Example: Caux dialect candelle, English candle, French chandelle). The name of the neighbouring Pays de Bray comes from an Old French word of Gaulish origin for mud. They appear to be so named as their soils distinguish them; the one of sticky clay, the other on dry chalk, but that is only a legend. In fact, according to something common in the former Gaul, the name derives from the Celtic tribe that lived here in ancient time: the Caletes (or Caleti. It means "the hard or the courageous people", Breton kaled hard, Welsh caled hard) and this land was their territory. They are sometimes considered as Belgae or as Armoricans. The word Caletes shifted to *Caltes, then *Calz, Cauz, to be spelled "Caux" in modern time.

== Geography ==
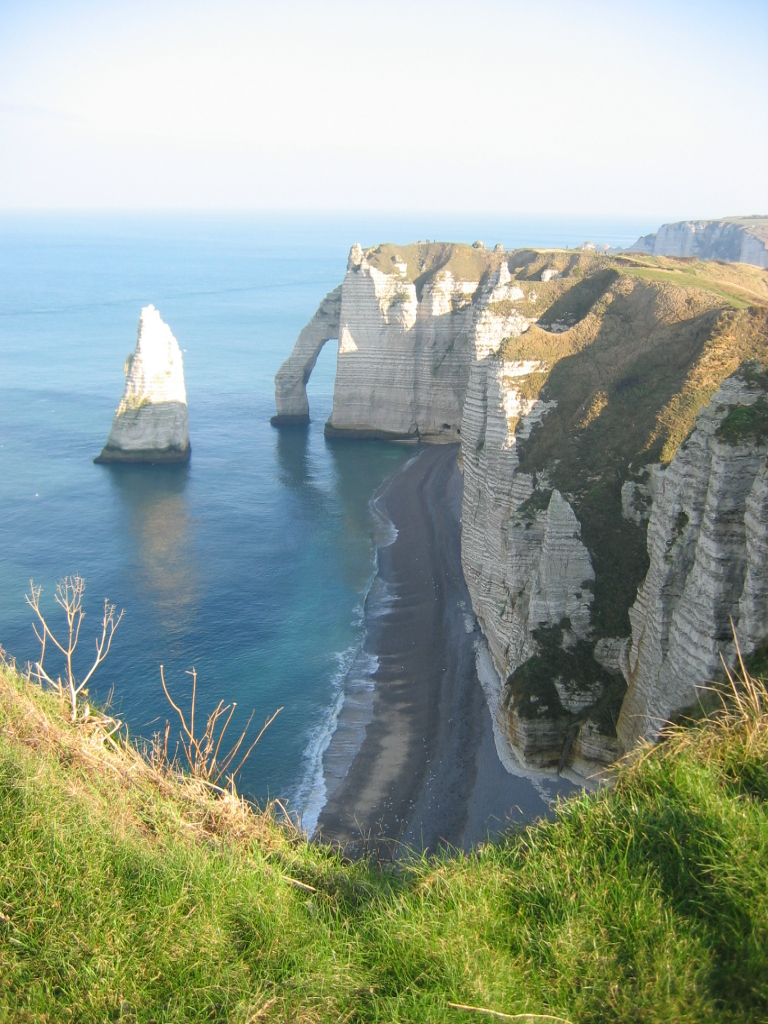
Étretat, falaise d'aval and the needle

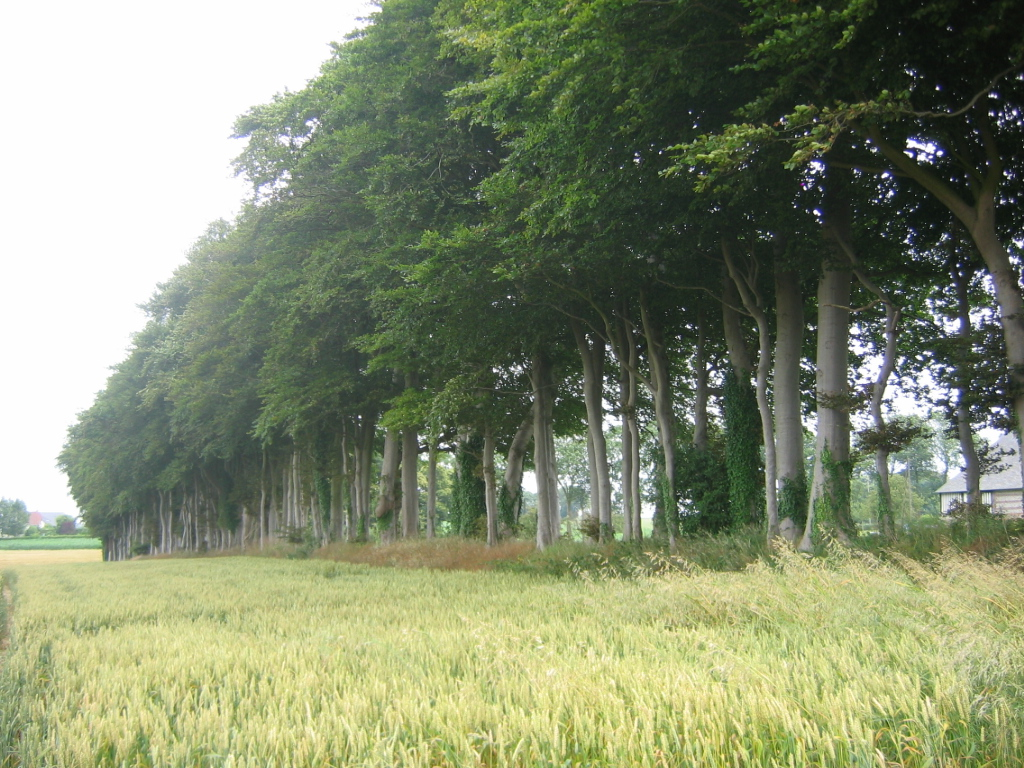
Beeches grown as a wind break around a now derelict farm on the Pays de Caux plateau.

The Pays de Caux is a plateau of Upper Cretaceous chalk, like that which forms the North and South Downs in southern England. Its surface is an undulating plateau but the seaward side has been eroded by the waves so that the coast is formed of high white cliffs. The small valleys that inland form the undulations, are truncated here, leaving what are known locally as valleuses, steep-sided notches in the face of the cliff. They are more or less deeply cut, and some form the sites of small towns such as Étretat. The formations left in the eroded cliff there have long attracted artists. See the photograph where Étretat lies to the right, in the valleuse beyond the first ridge.

The main towns in the north, Fécamp and Étretat, are on the coast. Dieppe, is towards the margin of the region, lying as it does on the same geological fault as formed the Pays de Bray. This fault gave rise to the deep harbour which the Northmen found when they arrived. (The Swedish for deep is djup.) The towns on the plateau are generally small. Of these, the larger, such as Yvetot, Bolbec and Lillebonne are towards the south, on the Rouen-Le Havre axis. The site of Le Havre was once part of the Pays de Caux but the town has developed into an entity with a separate nature.

The population density of the Pays de Caux is a little above the French average. Its traditional industries are fisheries, on the coast, and flax growing and weaving, on the plateau. Once hostilities between the Normans and the French had been settled with Paris, the estuarine ports to the south developed trade up-river towards Rouen. In more recent times, urbanization has spread from Le Havre and, more recently still, from the new industrial polder in the Seine Estuary.

The plateau's exposure to the winds of the sea may account for one of the features of the rural architecture of the region: the plain, unadorned farmhouses in farmsteads, typically enclosed by high earth banks, walls, and a sheltering square of trees. (see also Architecture of Normandy).

=== Neighbouring natural regions ===
- Pays de Bray to the East
- Vexin normand to the South-east
- Lower Seine valley to the South

== History ==
=== Independent Gaul ===
Julius Caesar's account of his military campaigns (Bellum Gallicum, The Gallic War) gives details of the Caletes, partly ancestors of the Cauchois (see Book II, 4, 9; Book VII, 75, 3–4, Book VIII, 7, 4)

=== Roman Gaul ===
Rescue archaeology undertaken on the line of the A29 autoroute revealed several Gallo-Roman villas. One of the most important is that of Sainte-Marguerite-sur-Mer, on the coast to the west of Dieppe. The archaeologists found a complex of several rooms, organised around a square court. Several of the rooms had been furnished with mosaics. To the north, the baths and other rooms were heated by hypocausts. The materials used were pisé (clay and grit well mixed and rammed down to form a wall), cob (a similar mixture of earth of a buttery consistency or marl, chopped straw and perhaps gravel) and timber framing, typical materials of Normandy's later building tradition.

Lillebonne is on the site of the main town of the Caletes, the Gaulish tribe of the region. The Gallo-Roman town was established with the name Juliobona, under Caesar Augustus and is famous for its Roman theatre. According to a common use in Roman Gaul, the bona (Gaulish word for "foundation, town") was dedicated to the Roman emperor, like Augustodunum (Autun), Augustonemetum (Clermont-Ferrand) or Augustodurum (Bayeux), etc. The phonetic evolution from the element Julio- to Lille- can be explained by the analogy with the French word for island: île, with the article agglutination l' = the, that makes sense with the word bona > bonne, which means "good" in French, so "l'île bonne" = the good island. Their original main oppidum could have been Caudebec-en-Caux or Fécamp, according to the archeological excavations and the numerous Gaulish artefacts, that were discovered in both towns.

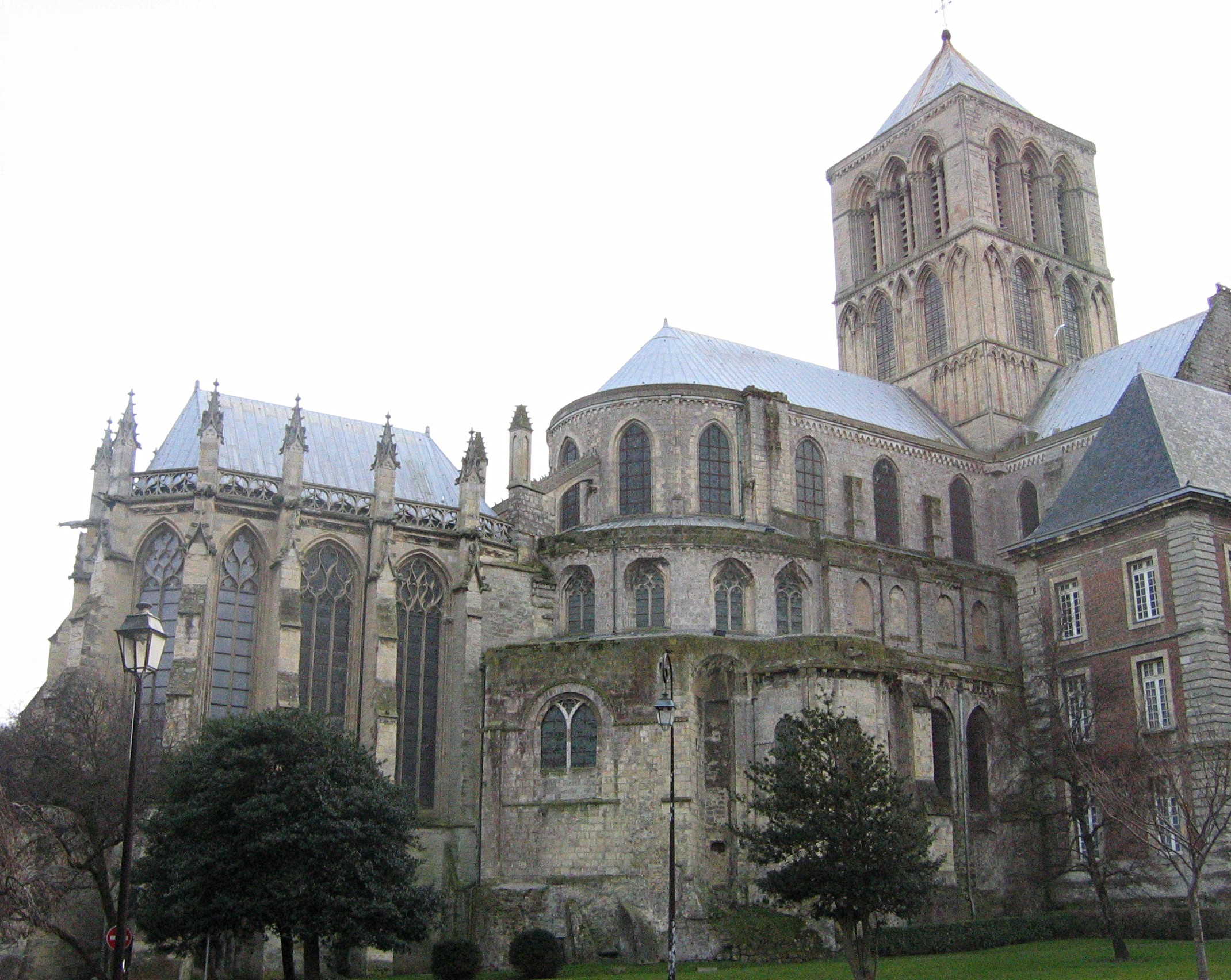
The abbey of Fécamp

=== Medieval ===
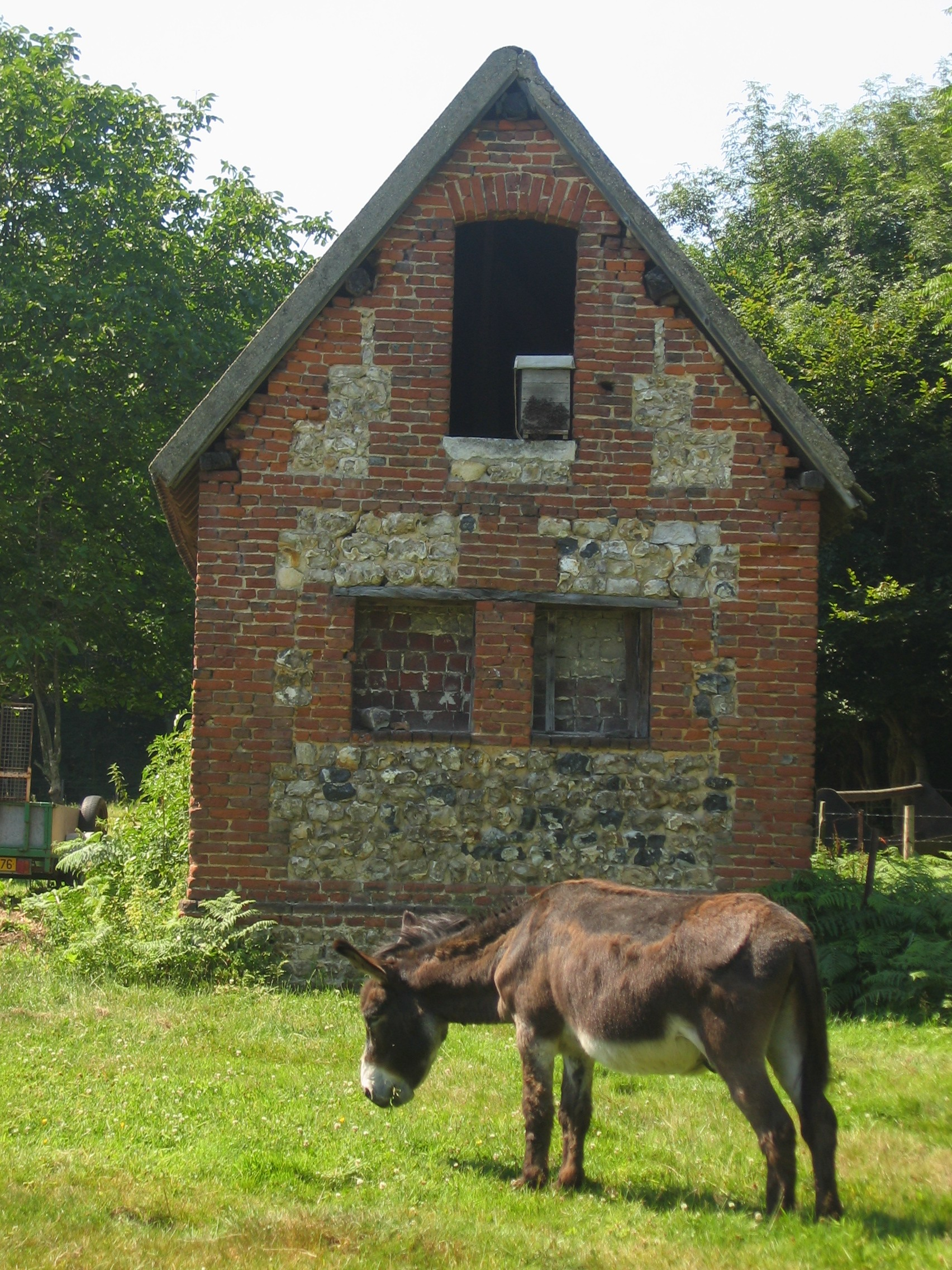
Pays de Caux: a small building in brick, flint and clunch

In the Merovingian period, the Pays de Caux became distinct from Talou: the ancient city of the Caletes separated into entities or 'countries' in the sense of the Latin pagus.

From the creation of the county of Rouen and of the Duchy of Normandy in 911, the Vikings settled a great number of people in the region and left an enduring legacy in the Cauchois dialect but also in the ethnic makeup of the Cauchois Normans.

=== Manoirs and châteaux of the 15th and 16th centuries ===
A manoir (manor house) is in principle, the residence of a seigniorial lord though, in practice, the term now includes country houses of the gentry. As a rule, they are not fortified. Since the Hundred Years' War, country houses have not had ramparts and towers. Artillery has rendered them obsolete. The peace and prosperity which were recovered following 1450, offered the option of reconstructing country houses and local materials such as flint and limestone were used. The owners could allow themselves to follow Renaissance style.

Most Norman manoirs have a dovecote in the courtyard. A study by historians revealed 635 dove cotes in the three arrondissements of Dieppe, Le Havre and Rouen. Most are round and are permanent structures. The rarities are polygonal and timber-framed. A few to be noted are:

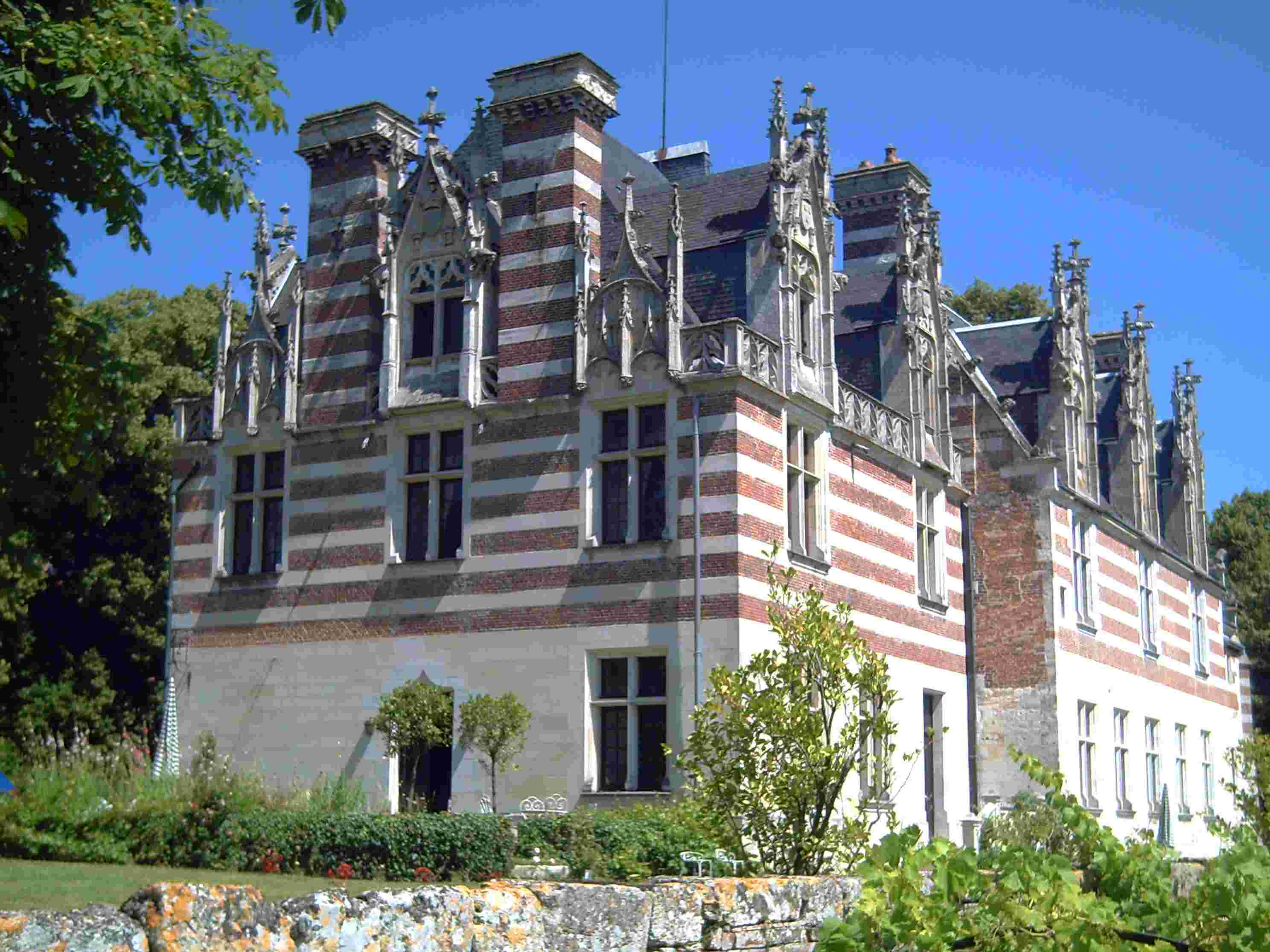
Chateau d'Ételan

- Château d'Ételan, Saint-Maurice-d'Ételan, 1494
- Manoir de la Bouteillerie, Rouelles, Le Havre, 1531, dovecote of 1631
- Manoir Dubocage de Bléville, Dollemard, Le Havre, 1516
- Manoir d'Harquebosc, Harfleur-Beaulieu
- Manoir de Reauté, between Octeville and Montivilliers, takes its name from a family of the 16th century. Contemporary with Francis I of France and Henry VIII of England.
- Château d'Epremesnil, Epremesnil, 1596, dovecote (note that the fief of Epremenil appears in the list of 1503 but the house, which was bombed in 1944 dates from the 19th century. (There must have been an earlier house and perhaps even a fief primitif (low Middle Ages) near the mill of Tauvais )
- Manoir du Grand Clos, 16th century.
- Manoir de Séntitot, Bévilliers, 1528: manoir in brick and stone, with Renaissance sculpture. The fief of Bevilliers was held by Louis de Richebourg and Jehanne Viennens. In 1624, a Protestant chapel (called in France a temple) was built behind the house.
- Manoir du Petit col Moulins, 16th century, dovecote.
- Manoir de Vitanval, Sainte-Addresse, early 15th century, with a 16th-century dovecote. It is a manoir of timber-frame construction with a staircase in an external turret. In 1563, the constable de Montmorency stayed there.
- Manoir d'Estouteville, with loggias, built in the 15th century by Guillaume d'Estouteville, archbishop of Rouen in 1453.

== Literary connections ==
=== The coast: la côte d'Albâtre ===
Guy de Maupassant, Le saut du berger (The Shepherd's Leap). Originally published in Gil Blas of 9 March 1882:

From Dieppe to Le Havre the coast presents an uninterrupted cliff, about a hundred metres high and straight as a wall. Here and there that great line of white rocks drops sharply and a little, narrow valley, with steep slopes, shaved turf and maritime rushes, comes down from the cultivated plateau towards a beach of shingle where it ends with a ravine like the bed of a torrent. Nature has made these valleys; the rains of storms have ended with them in the shape of these ravines, trimming what was left of the cliff, excavating down to the sea, the bed of waters which acts as a passage for mankind. Sometimes, a village is snuggled into these valleys, where the wind of the open sea is devoured.

Guy de Maupassant, Pierre et Jean, chapter 6

The cool air, where the smell of the coast and of the gorse, the clover and the grasses, the briny scent of the uncovered rocks, stirred him still as it gently intoxicated him and he made his mind up, a little at each step, each second, each glance thrown at the alert outline of the young woman; he decided not to hesitate in telling her that he loved her and that he wanted to marry her. He would use the peach to induce their tête-à-tête; and besides, it would be a pretty frame, a pretty place for speaking of love, feet in a pool, of limpid water, watching as the long beards of the shrimps fled under the bladder-wrack. When they reached the end of the little valley on the edge of the abyss, they noticed a little path which went down along the cliff, and below them, between the sea and the foot of the mountain, about half way up the slope, a surprising chaos of huge rocks, collapsed, turned upside down, piled together, one on another in a sort of turbulent grassy plain which ran as far as the eye could see towards the south, formed by old landslides. On that long strip of undergrowth and shaken turf, one might have said by the stirring of a volcano, the fallen rocks looked like the ruins of a great vanished city which once looked out onto the ocean, itself dominated by the white, endless wall of the cliff.

=== Inland: the plateau ===
Guy de Maupassant admirably describes the rural feeling of the Pays de Caux in his novels. For example: drawn from Miss Harriet, published in Le Gaulois of 9 July 1883, under the title Miss Hastings, then, in the compendium Miss Harriet; Maupassant describes a journey by public coach from Etretat to Tancarville:

It was Autumn. From the two sides of the way the stripped fields extended, yellowed by the short stubble of the harvested oats and wheat which covered the ground like an ill-shaven beard. The misty land seemed to be smoking. The skylarks were singing in the air, other birds piped in the bushes. The sun finally rose before us, all red on the edge of the horizon; and as it climbed, lighter from minute to minute, the countryside seemed to be waking, to smile, shake itself and throw off, like a girl rising from her bed, its shift of white vapour. The Comte d'Etraille, on the seat, cried; "Look, a hare" pointing to the left towards a patch of clover. The animal darted away, almost hidden in the field, showing only its long ears; then it bolted over some plough-land, stopped, set off again in a mad race, changed direction, stopped again, troubled, listening for any danger, undecided which way to go; then started to run again with big bounds of his hindquarters, and he disappeared in a wide square of beet. All the men marvelled, following the creature's progress and gait.

=== Two writers from Rouen ===
- Gustave Flaubert
- Maurice Leblanc

== Artistic connections ==
The rugged scenery of the Pays de Caux, within a comparatively short distance from Paris, encouraged artists, including Claude Monet and Gustave Courbet to travel there to paint.

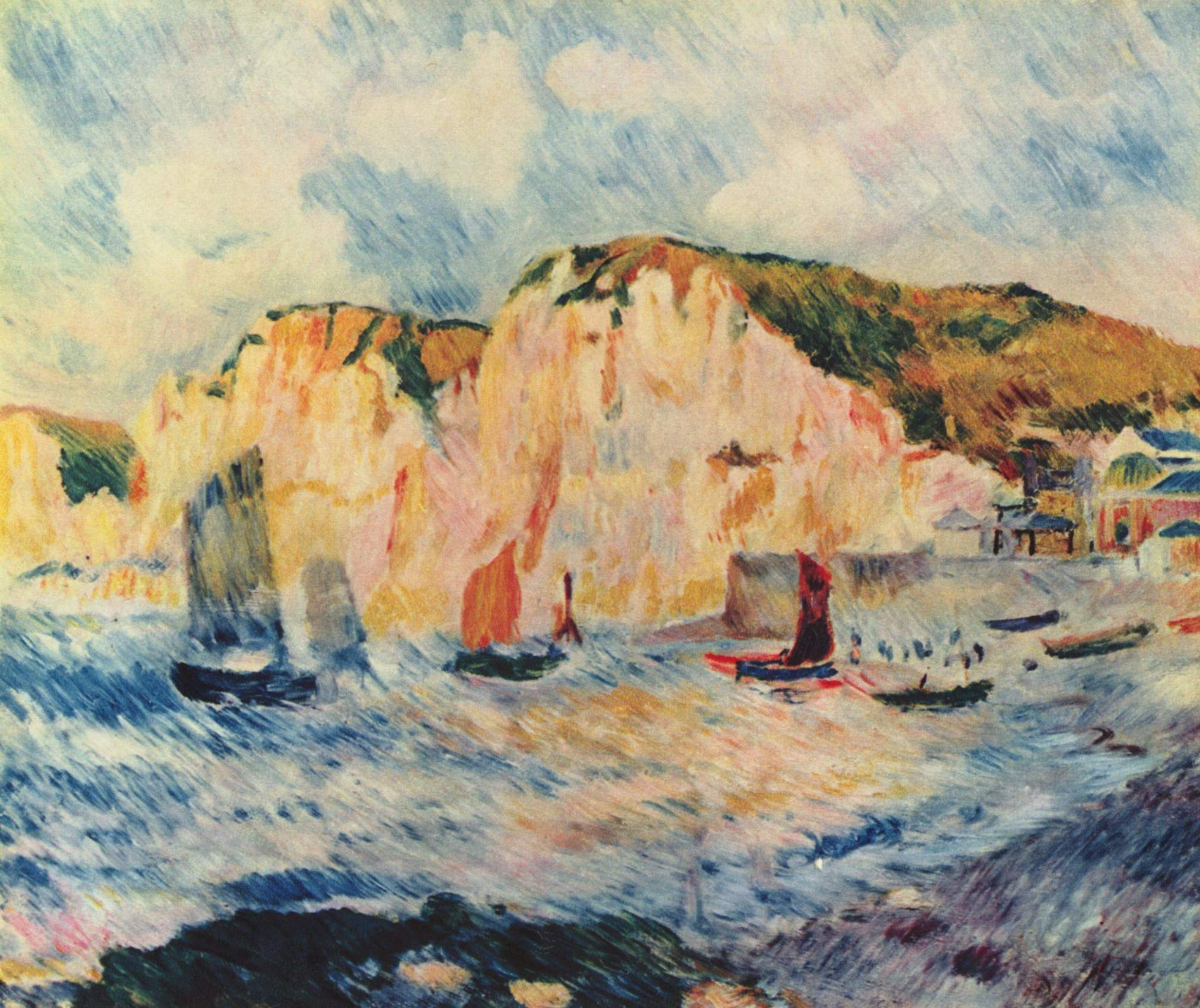
Pierre-Auguste Renoir, Mer et bateaux, 1883, Metropolitan Museum of Art, New York. Note the Valleuses, one containing a village.

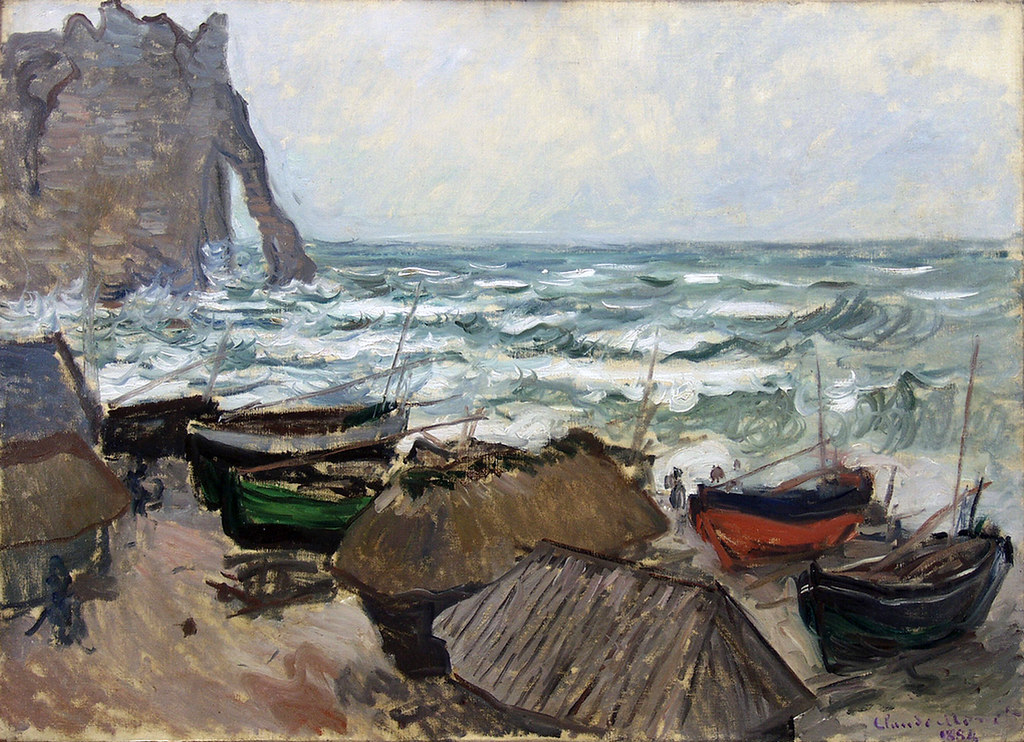
Monet

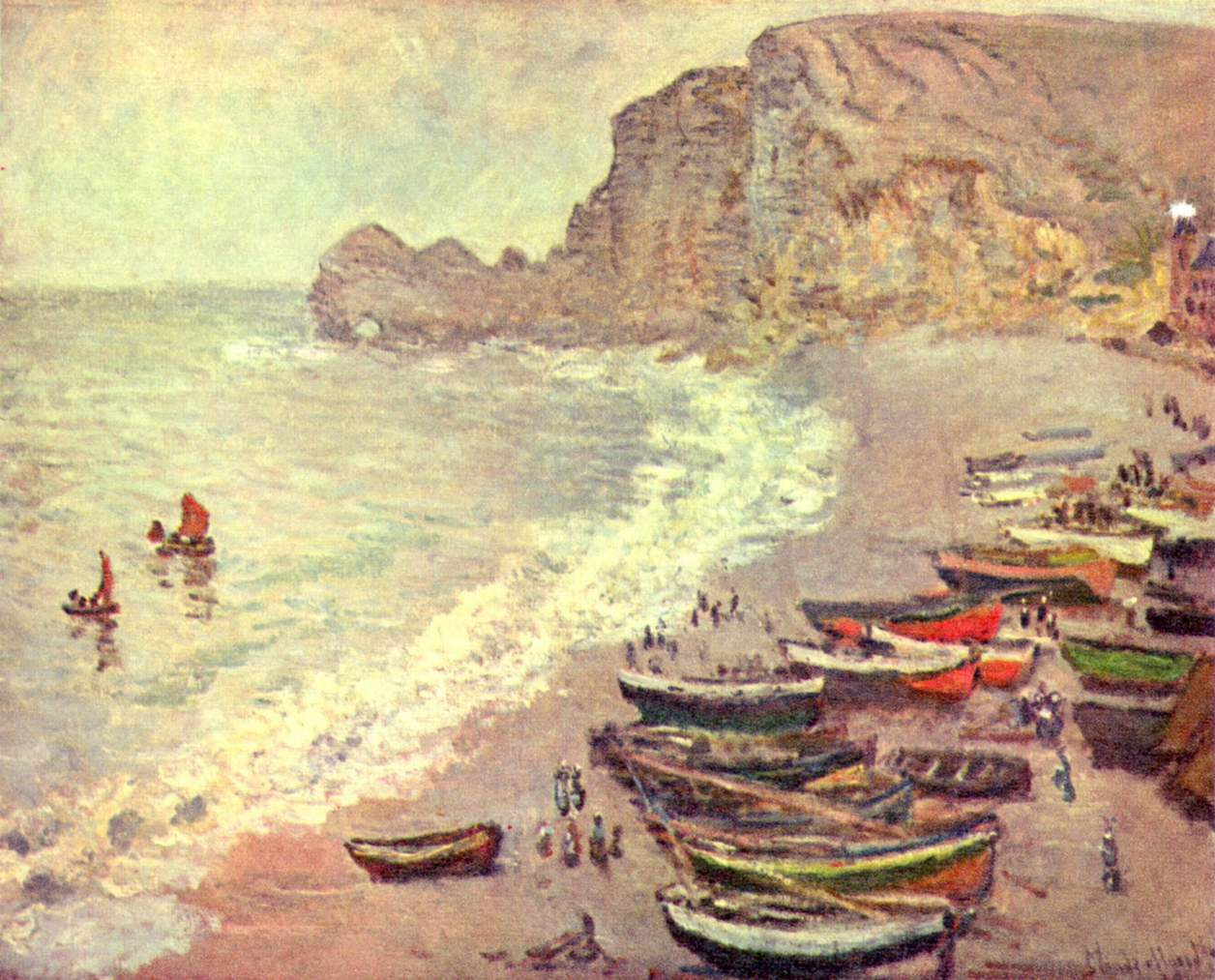
Monet

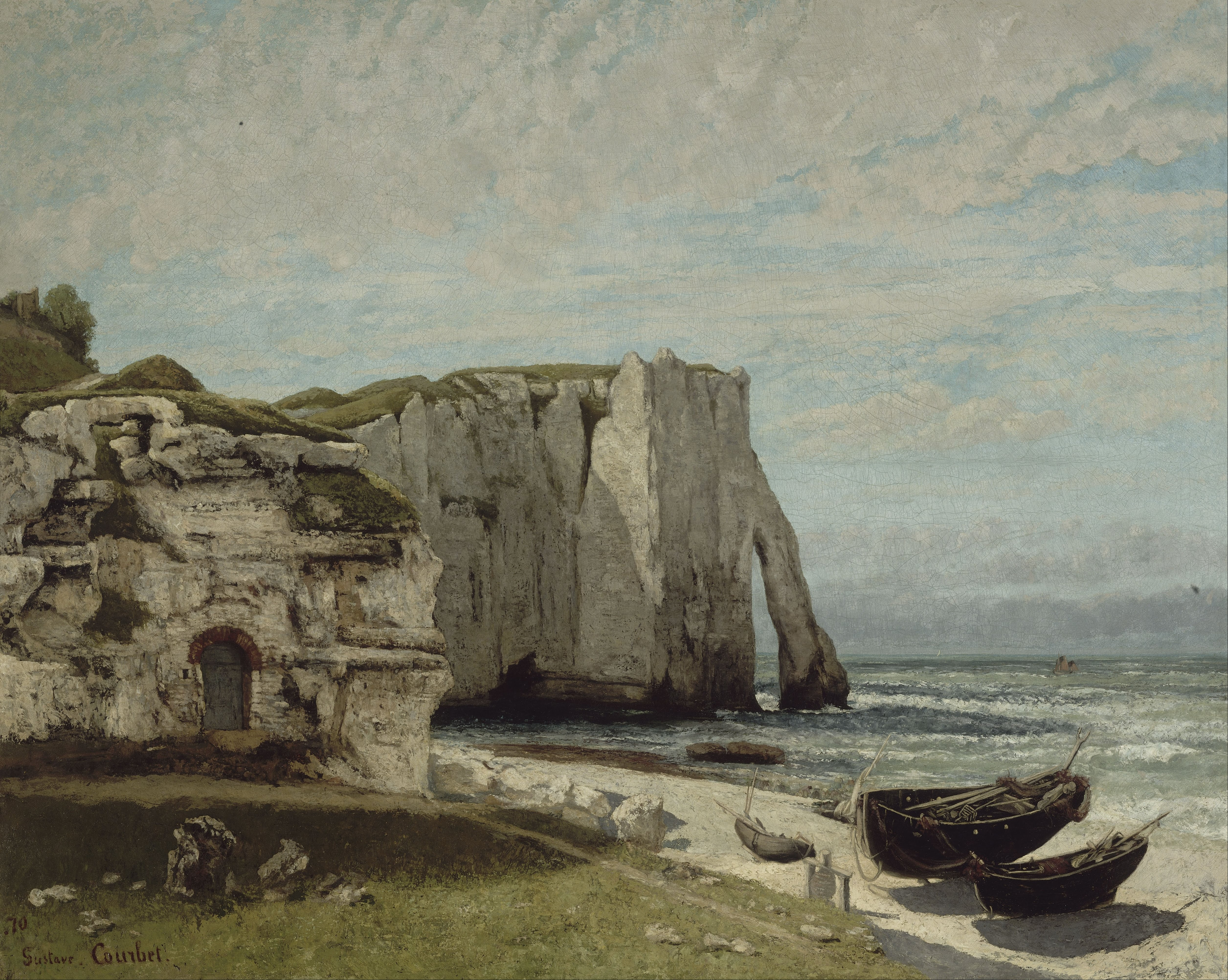
Courbet

== Bibliography ==
- Michel LECUREUR, Manoirs du pays de Caux, éditions Charles Corlet, Condé-sur-Noireau, 1992; ISBN 2-85480-357-4
