= Eu–Mers-les-Bains / Le Tréport tramway =

French tramway

Eu – Mers-les-Bains / Le Tréport line
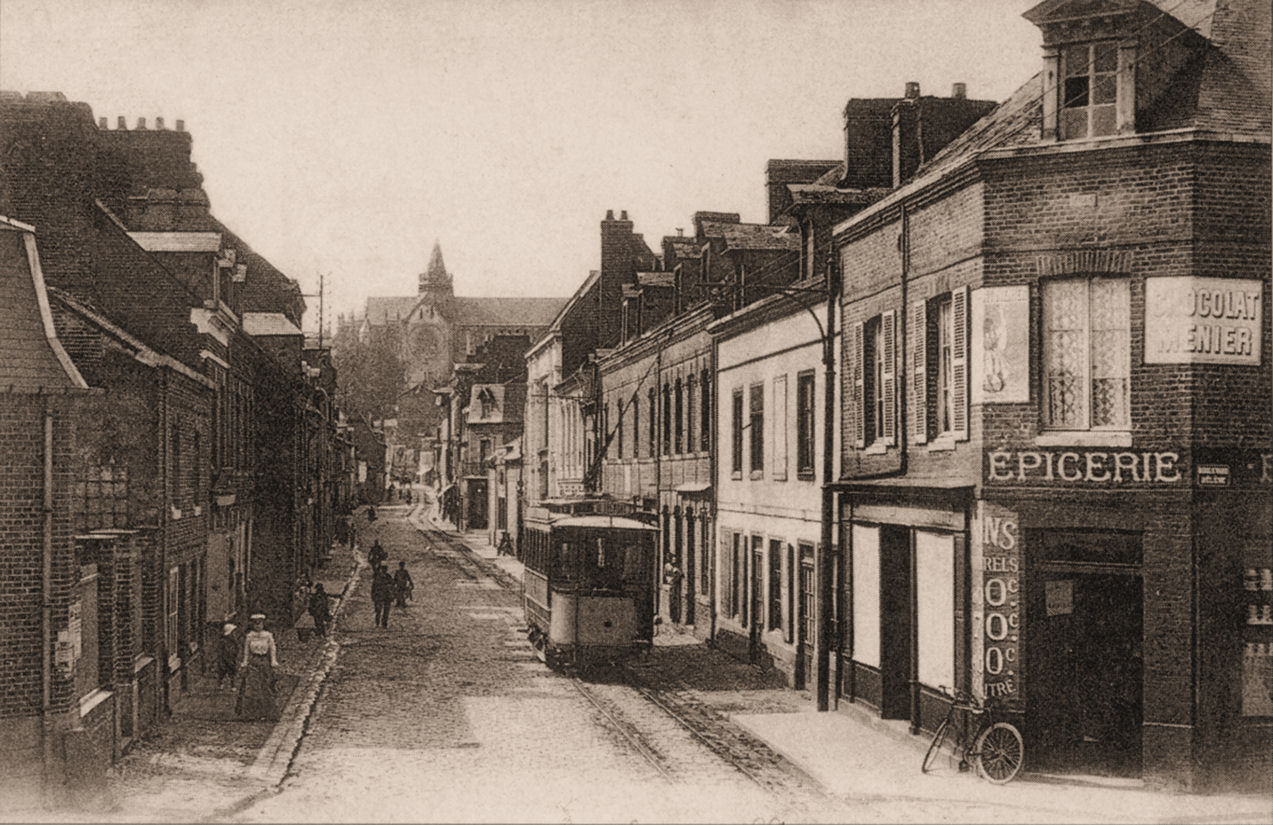
- The tramway in Eu, chaussée de Picardie.

Service
- Operator(s): Electric tramway company from Eu to Tréport
- Depot(s): Le Tréport
- Daily ridership: 500,000 before the First World War

History
- Opened: 1902
- Last extension: 1909
- Closed: 1934

Technical
- Line length: 6.3 km (3.9 mi)
- Track gauge: Metric

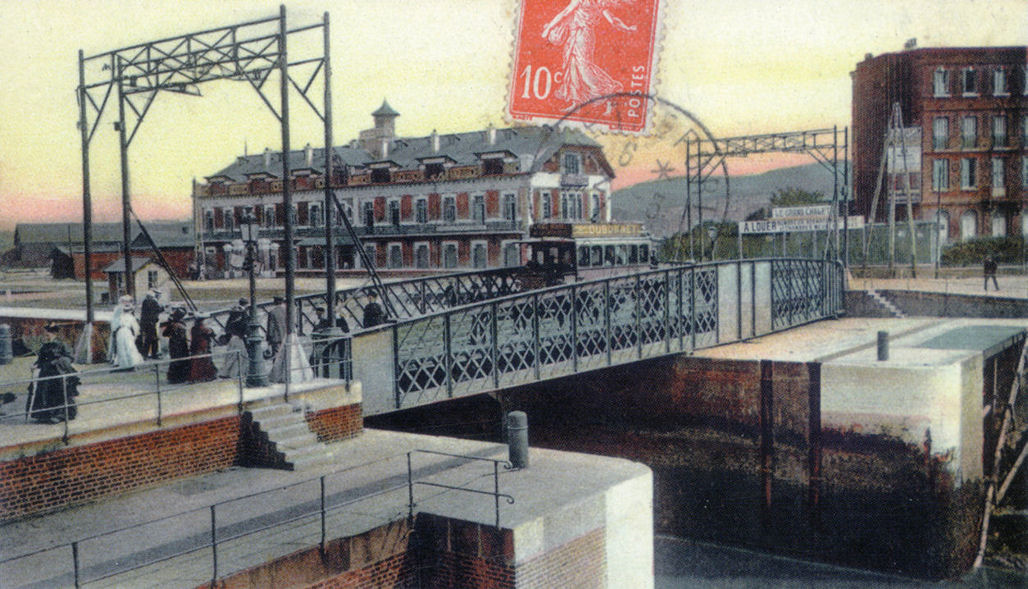
The tramway on the swing bridge at Le Tréport.

The Eu–Mers-les-Bains / Le Tréport line was a metre-gauge tramway that began operation in 1902, serving the border area between the departments of Seine-Inférieure (now Seine-Maritime) and Somme. It provided transportation for both residents and tourists among the towns of Eu, Mers-les-Bains, and Le Tréport for over thirty years. Before World War I, the line was a popular mode of transport, carrying nearly 500,000 passengers annually. Proposals were made to extend the line to additional destinations along the Alabaster Coast, though these were not implemented.

The decline in tramway traffic during the 1920s and early 1930s was attributed to the impact of World War I, a lack of modernization, and growing competition from automobiles and buses. The line ceased operations at the end of 1934.

== Construction ==
Located at the border between Normandy and Picardy, the conurbation formed by the towns of Eu, Le Tréport, and Mers-les-Bains—known collectively as the "three sister towns"—had a population of approximately 10,000 at the end of the 19th century. The area is organized around the estuary of the Bresle River, at the mouth of a valley with an established glassmaking industry. Eu, situated in Seine-Inférieure (now Seine-Maritime), is a bourgeois town centered around its château, which served as a residence of King Louis-Philippe I between 1830 and 1848. Le Tréport, also in Seine-Inférieure, developed as both a port and a seaside resort. Mers-les-Bains, located in the Somme department, also embraced sea bathing, a practice popularized on the English Channel coast from the 1820s onward.

The "three sister towns" formed a sufficiently populated agglomeration to justify the development of an electric tramway network, as indicated by a traffic survey conducted in July and August 1893. On July 16, 1897, the Compagnie Générale de Traction applied to construct and operate a tramway line between Eu and Le Tréport (Note: A disagreement with the municipality of Mers, which demanded a complete Eu-Le Tréport-Mers loop, meant that the line did not serve the Picardy town until later.) without public subsidies. Following a public inquiry, during which an initial proposed route was rejected due to objections from the Compagnie des Eaux and residents, the project was granted public utility status on July 24, 1899.

The approved route was as follows: The metre-gauge tramway, operating on 550-volt direct current, began at the station square of Eu-La Chaussée, which was connected to the Northern Railway Company network (serving Le Tréport, Abbeville, Paris via Beauvais and Abancourt) and the Western Railway Company network (serving Dieppe). The tramway route followed the sidewalk opposite the station building and terminated at Battery Square in Le Tréport, near the seafront. It passed through the main districts of Eu via Chaussée de Picardie, Rue de l’Abbaye, and Place Carnot, and through Le Tréport along the quays and Place de la Poissonnerie, near the beach. Between the two towns, the line ran along the right-hand side of the national road, passing the wall of the Château d’Eu park, owned by the Duke of Orléans. In Le Tréport, near the Pont des Chasses, a 752-meter branch diverged toward Mers-les-Bains. This branch passed in front of the Tréport-Mers station, a terminus for leisure trains, and ended just before the Picardy town boundary. The depot and power station supplying electricity to the line were located near the midpoint of the route, at the junction of the municipal territories of Eu and Le Tréport.

== Early years of operation ==
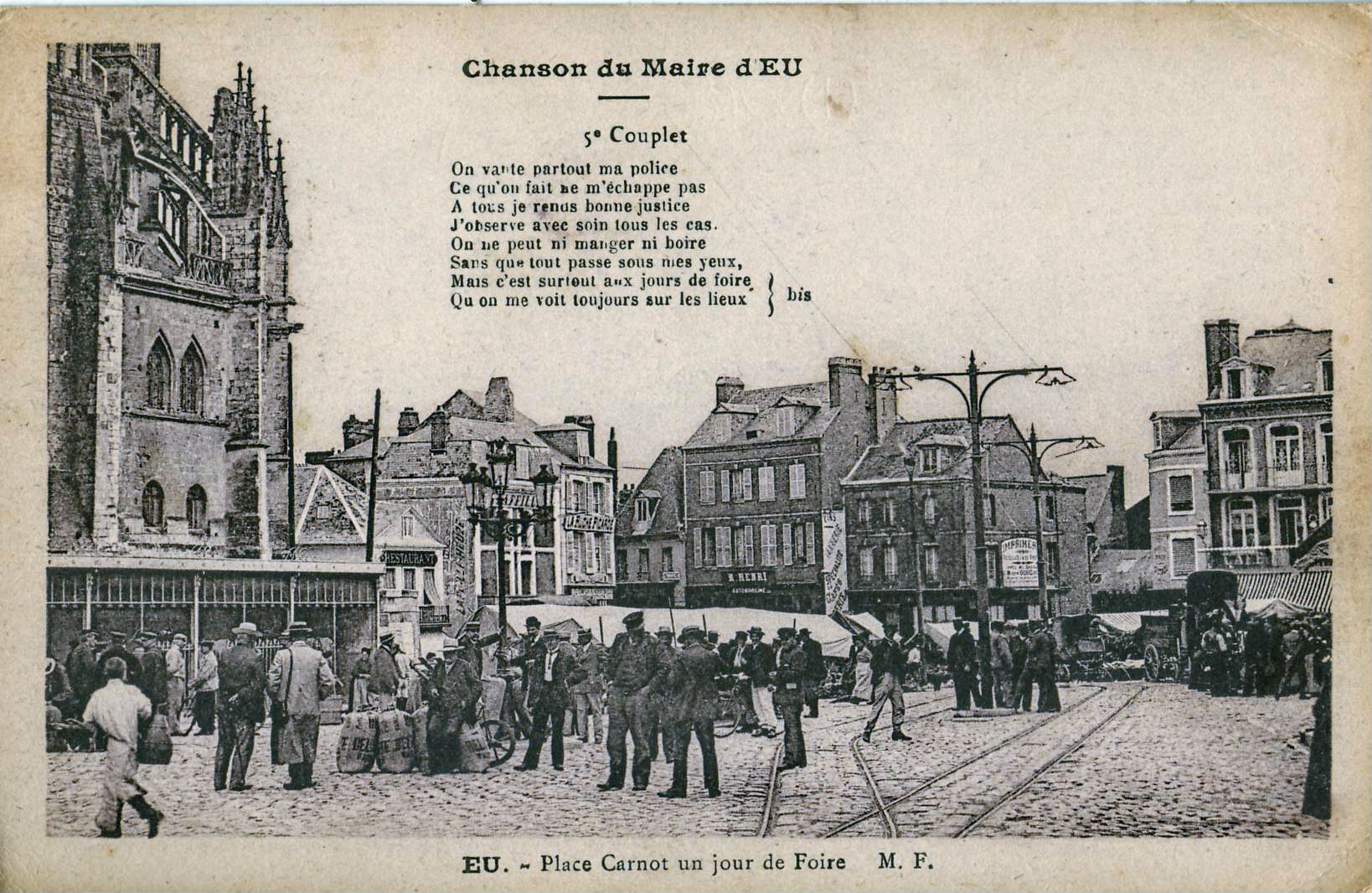
The Collégiale d'Eu bypass in postcard.

Construction of the tramway began in April 1900, nearly six months behind schedule. The Compagnie Générale de Traction cited the poor quality of the local water supply, used for the boilers, as a factor in the delays. Testing of the tram engines took place in early 1902, and the line, excluding the Mers branch, was inaugurated on May 31, 1902 with a formal ceremony attended by local officials, including Paul Bignon, the deputy and mayor of Eu. Public service began the following day, June 1, 1902, and saw high ridership, with over 4,000 passengers and operations continuing until midnight. The line was operated by the Electric Tramway Company from Eu to Tréport, a subsidiary of the Compagnie Générale de Traction. Initially offering hourly service, the frequency increased to every 30 minutes from 15 June. The journey between Le Tréport and Place Carnot in Eu took 20 minutes, and 25 minutes to the Eu-La Chaussée station, covering a total distance of 5,138 meters. The timetable offered consistent service year-round, with summer hours from 7:00 a.m. to 10:00 p.m. and winter hours from 8:00 a.m. to 8:00 p.m. The line included 18 stops, and the discontinuation of on-demand stops shortly after opening often resulted in delays.

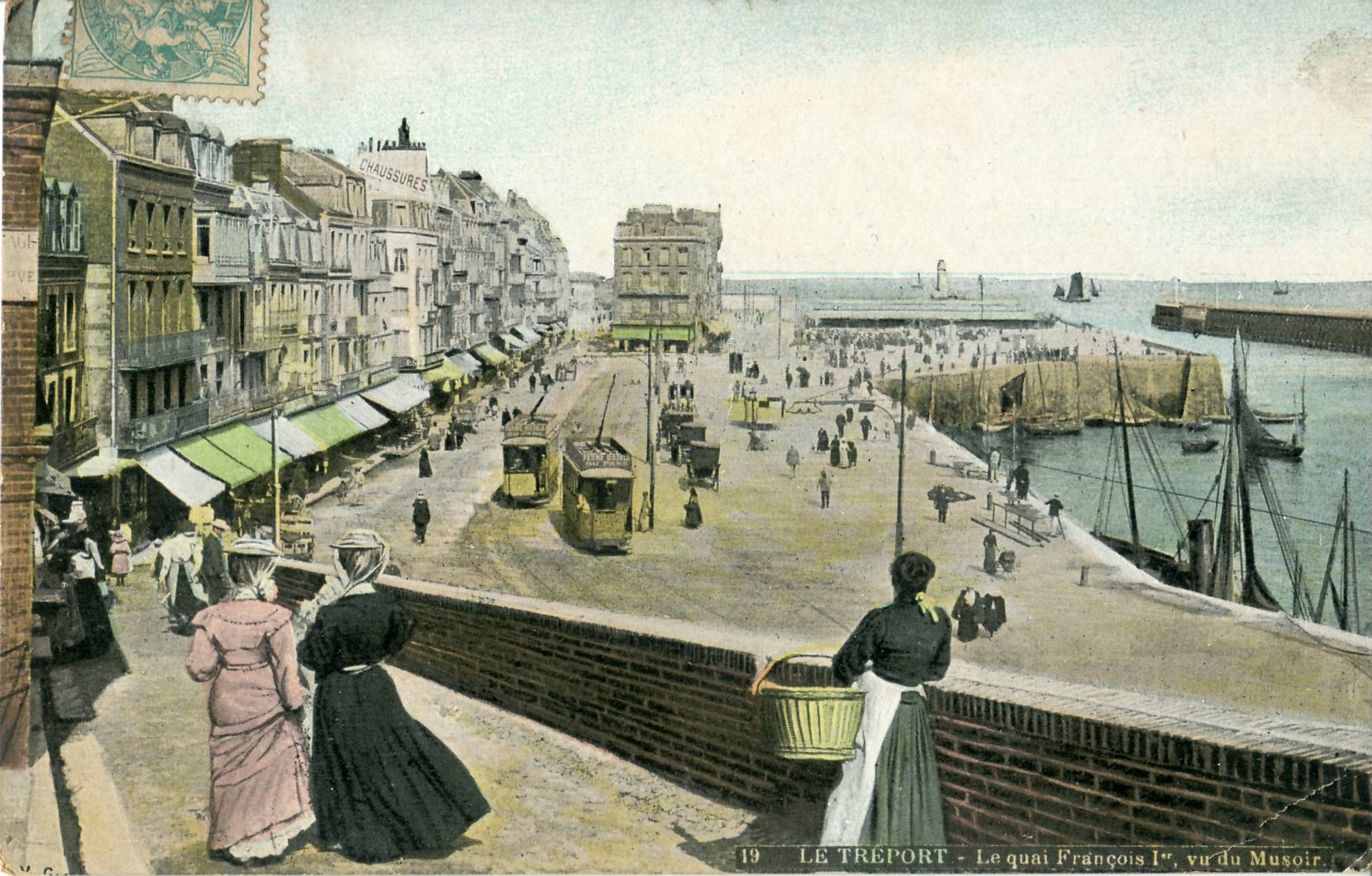
The tramway on the quays of Le Tréport.

The branch line to Mers was opened to traffic on July 10, 1904. An initial commissioning took place on June 26. However, service was suspended the following day after a three-masted ship damaged the overhead wire supports on the swing bridge connecting the outer harbor to the floating dock at Le Tréport. The extension added over 750 meters to the network and was initially operated only during the summer season. Further negotiations with the municipal authorities of Mers led to an extension to La Prairie, in the town center, which opened on July 2, 1909. This additional 400-meter section brought the total network length to 6,290 meters. Service on the branch line was initially provided at 30-minute intervals, later increasing to 20-minute intervals during the summer. Special departures were scheduled to accommodate the end of performances at the Le Tréport casino.

Despite a serious accident on 15 August 1904, two years after the line's opening, in which seventeen people were injured following a collision between two tramcars, one of which had gone out of control, the tramway continued to experience strong public support. Before the First World War, annual ridership reached approximately 500,000 passengers. On certain summer Sundays, traffic peaked at around 4,500 passengers. During these periods of high demand, tramcars were occasionally unable to ascend the steep slopes at Vert-Bocage, requiring some passengers to disembark and walk alongside the vehicles for part of the route.

== From extension plans to closure ==
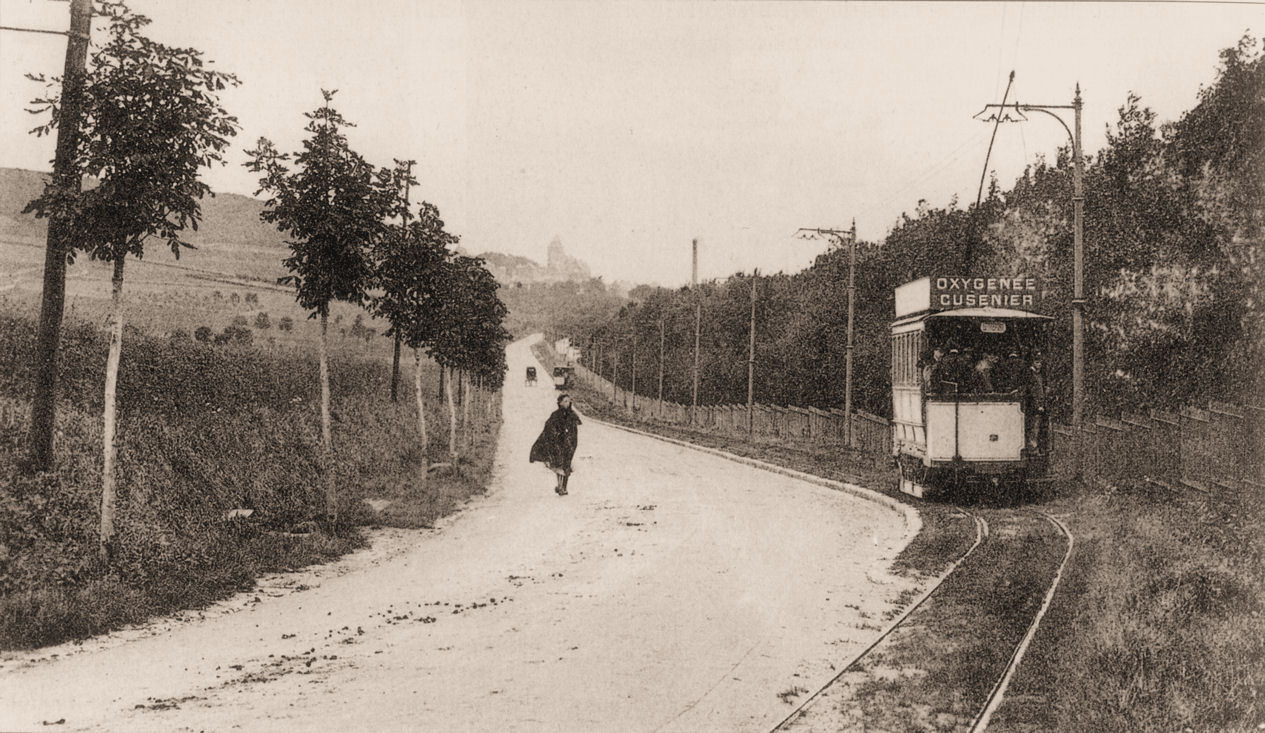
The tramway between Eu and Le Tréport, two locomotives shortly before crossing.

The success of the tramway led to an expansion of the traction fleet and prompted proposals to extend the network.

In 1904, a project was proposed to connect Le Tréport with the seaside resort of Mesnil Val, part of the commune of Criel-sur-Mer, to improve access to the Terrasses area situated on the cliffs west of the port. The proposed 5.5-kilometer route would have ascended the Musoir slope, passed through the Grande Rue, crossed the plateau, and descended into the dry valley where Mesnil Val is located. However, the project faced technical challenges related to steep gradients and concerns about increased costs if the route were altered to avoid them. Opposition also arose from those who feared the development might divert tourism from Le Tréport. The departmental council ultimately rejected the proposal in 1905, citing concerns over speculative real estate interests.

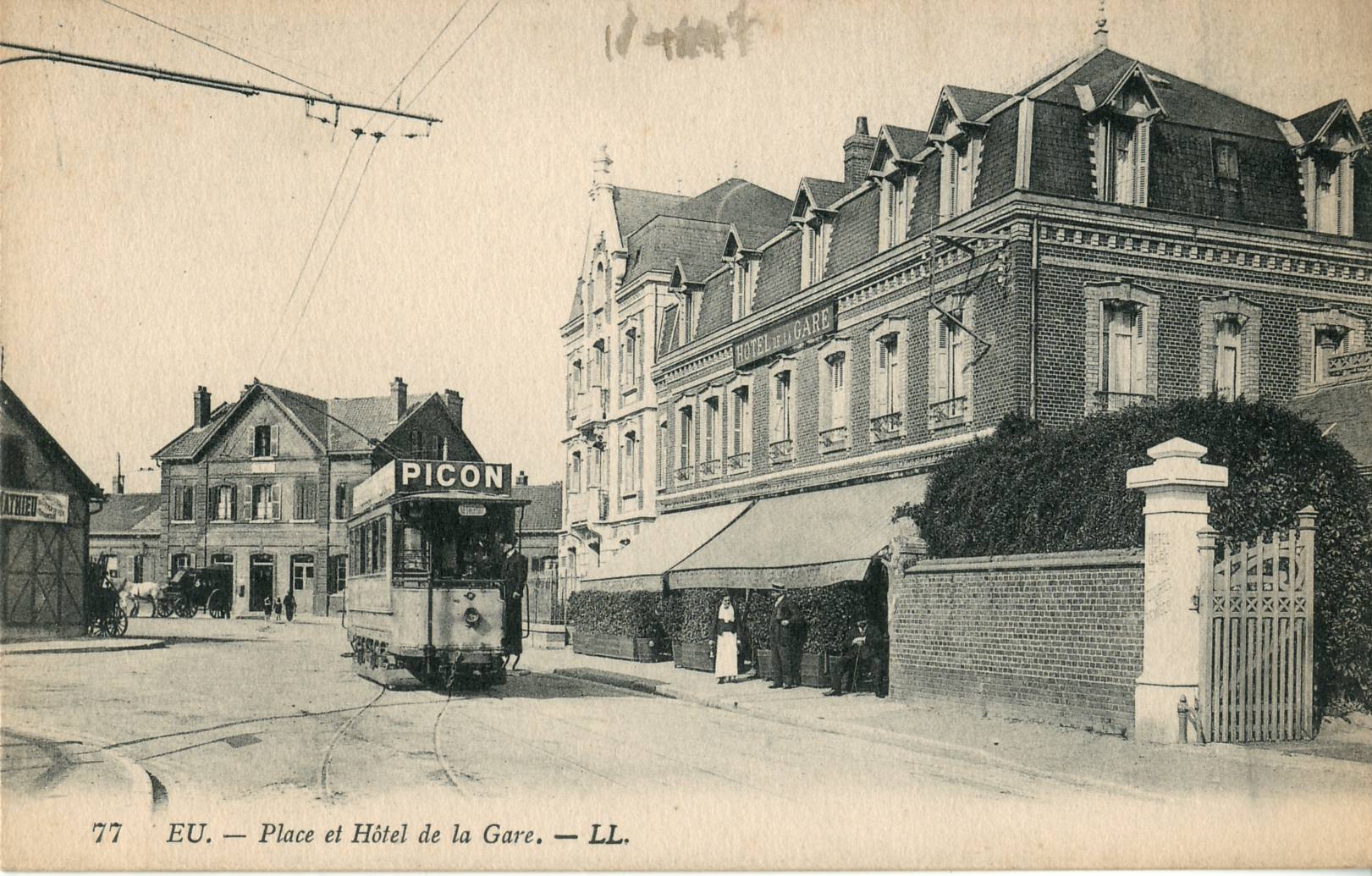
Rame at the Eu terminus, before the closure of its platforms

A second proposed line aimed to connect Eu with Ault, a coastal town located to the east in the Somme department. Preliminary studies began in 1908. (Note: An initial project to serve Ault from Le Tréport - Mers-les-Bains had been presented in 1900 as part of a steam tramway line linking the latter towns to Cayeux-sur-Mer, but this request was shelved.) The route was planned to diverge from the main line shortly after Eu station, then follow main roadways to ascend the Vimeu plateau and reach Ault, running parallel to an existing steam tramway that linked Ault to the Feuquières-en-Vimeu station on the Abbeville–Le Tréport railway, operated by the Compagnie des chemins de fer du Nord. The proposed 7.7-kilometer line was designed as a branch of the existing electric tramway, to be operated with similar electric tramcars powered by the network's central power station. A new shed near Eu station would have housed the vehicles, while maintenance was to be carried out at the main depot. The project was delayed due to opposition from the Compagnie du Nord and the lack of financial guarantees from the concession applicants, despite support from the Electric Tramway Company from Eu to Tréport. The project was ultimately abandoned following the outbreak of the First World War.

The First World War led to a decline in passenger numbers due to service reductions associated with the national context. Following the end of hostilities, traffic recovered; however, rising labor and material costs, combined with the growth of automobile use in the early 1920s, resulted in a gradual decrease in ridership and a reduction in the number of tramway trailers in operation. Passenger numbers dropped to 375,000 in 1927 and 328,000 in 1932, contributing to a growing operational deficit. In 1932, the transition from tramway to bus service began. The company introduced buses, initially replacing tramcars on the Mers line, which had low ridership and high maintenance costs due to damage to the overhead wires from sea air. On the main Eu–Le Tréport line, a single bus was introduced, with the tramway serving as a backup in case of mechanical failure and during peak periods, such as summer weekends. This dual system required a combined timetable, noting: “In the event of a bus breakdown, consult the following tramway schedule.” This arrangement proved inefficient and financially unsustainable. The tramway ceased operation on November 1, 1934, although the closure was formally confirmed by a decree dated 30 August 1939, with retroactive effect.

== Personnel ==
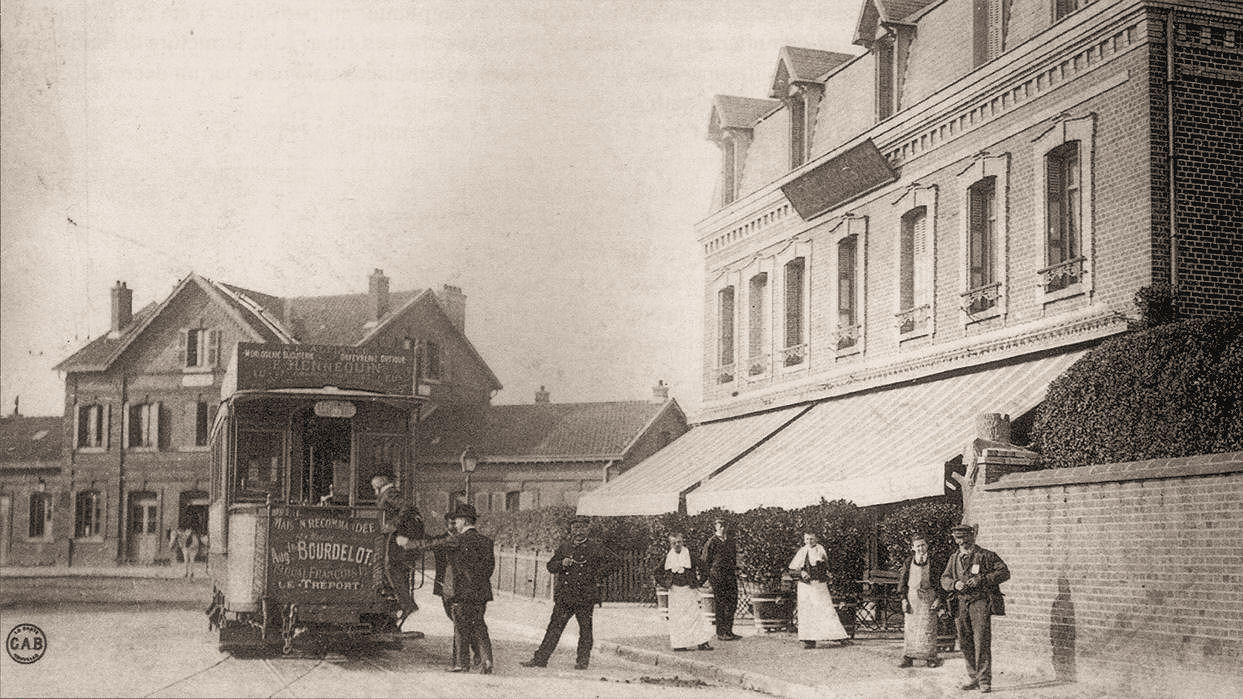
The tramway in front of the Hôtel de la Gare and the Eu-La Chaussée station, the line's terminus.

To minimize operating costs, the number of employees at the Company was kept low. In 1902, at the time of the line’s opening, the workforce (excluding the Company director) consisted of ten staff members:

- Five in the traction department: one depot manager and four drivers or motormen.
- Four in the operations department: four fare collectors.
- One in track maintenance: one trackman.

The number of employees increased gradually, from twelve in 1911 to fourteen by 1927, until the end of operations. This growth was primarily due to changes in labor regulations concerning working hours and the progressive deterioration of the tracks, which required increased maintenance. Staffing figures provided by the company were indicative, as employees often performed multiple functions based on operational requirements.

== Technical description ==
=== Track and buildings ===
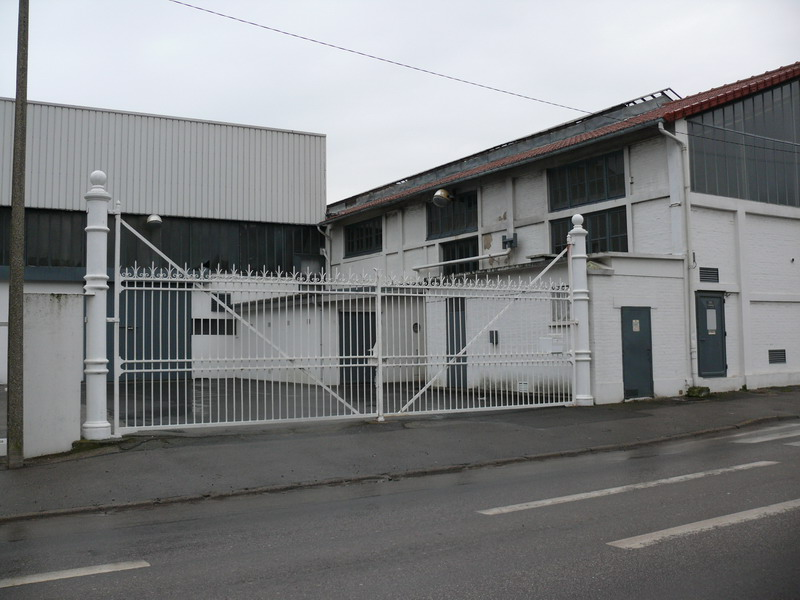
The remains of the tramway depot in 2006.

The line was built as a single track with four passing loops—three on the Eu to Le Tréport route and one on the Mers-les-Bains branch—to allow tramcars to pass. Two types of rails were used: Broca rails (37 kg/m), embedded in the roadway, and Vignole rails (20 kg/m), mounted on sleepers for non-urban sections. While the track profile was relatively mild in the built-up areas of Le Tréport and Mers-les-Bains, gradients in Eu exceeded 60‰, placing significant strain on the rolling stock. One section near Vert-Bocage reached a gradient of 65‰ combined with tight curves.

A single building, located at the boundary between Eu and Le Tréport, served multiple functions: it housed the company’s offices, the depot, the repair workshop for rolling stock, and the power station supplying electricity to the line. Stops were marked by posts, and tickets were sold onboard by tram staff.

=== Rolling stock ===
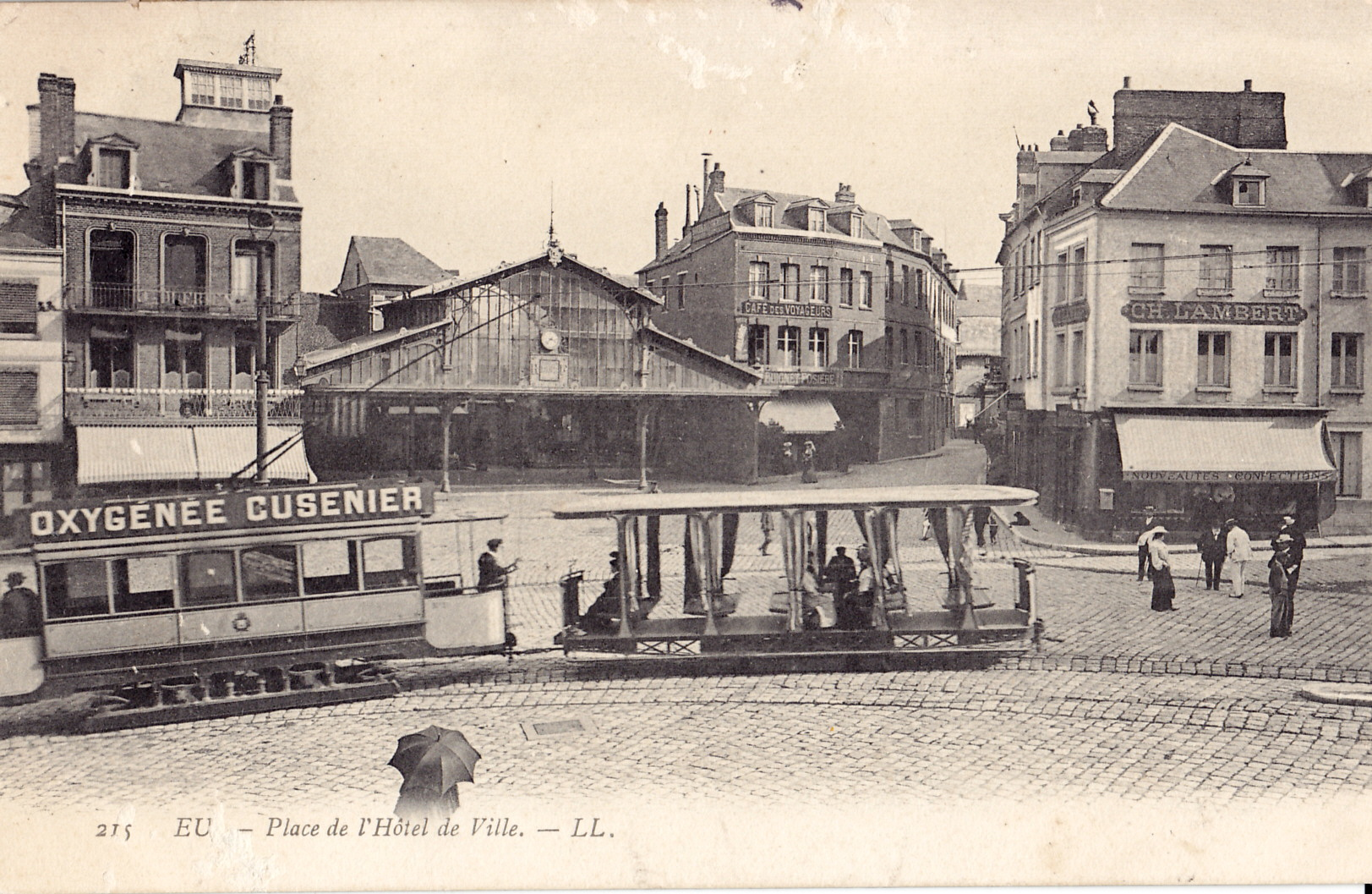
Wanderer and motor, in front of the Eu market hall.

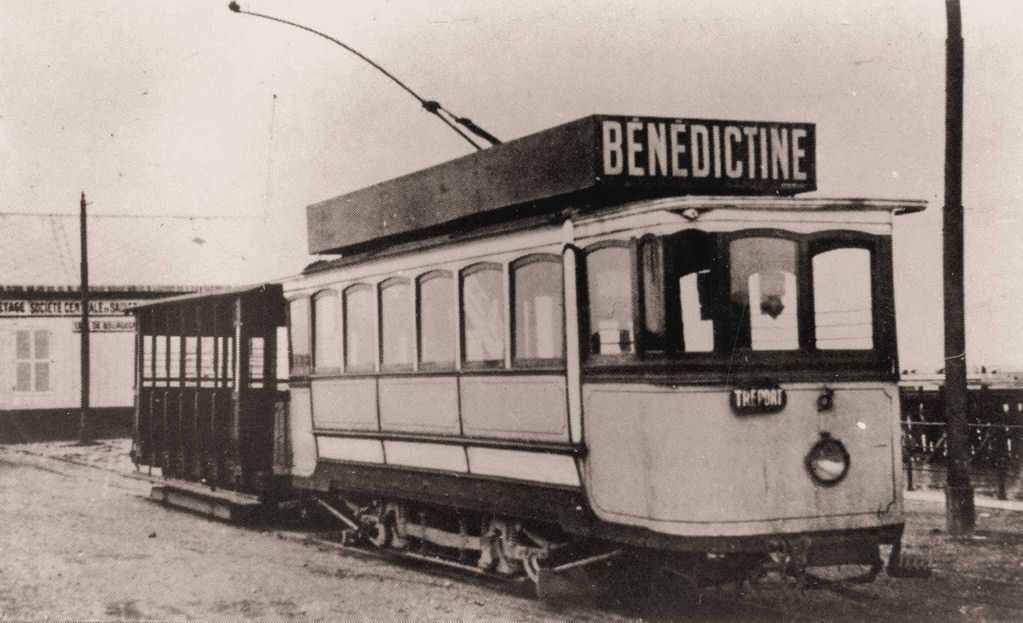
An engine with a closed platform and its “baladeuse” at Le Tréport.

The line was operated using two-axle tramcars of a standard type built by the Compagnie Générale de Construction, each equipped with two 25 hp motors for a total output of 50 hp. The tramcars had open platforms at both ends and could accommodate 44 passengers, with 24 seated on longitudinal benches in two compartments and 20 standing. Some vehicles were later modified with enclosed platforms, a process known as “vestibulage.” Tramcars operated alone or with an open trailer known as a baladeuse, which had side steps and a capacity of 40 passengers. These trailers were used seasonally, primarily in summer, and some were fitted with curtains or glazed partitions for passenger comfort.

At the start of operations, the fleet included four tramcars, four trailers, and one freight wagon for mail and parcels. The fleet was gradually expanded before World War I, reaching six tramcars by 1903 and seven by 1910, with the number of trailers increasing to five in 1904 and six in 1912. This represented the network's peak rolling stock. Following the war and the subsequent decline in traffic, the fleet was reduced, with the withdrawal of at least three trailers and the freight wagon.

== Tramway ride ==
A trip to the Belle Époque on the streetcars of the three sister cities

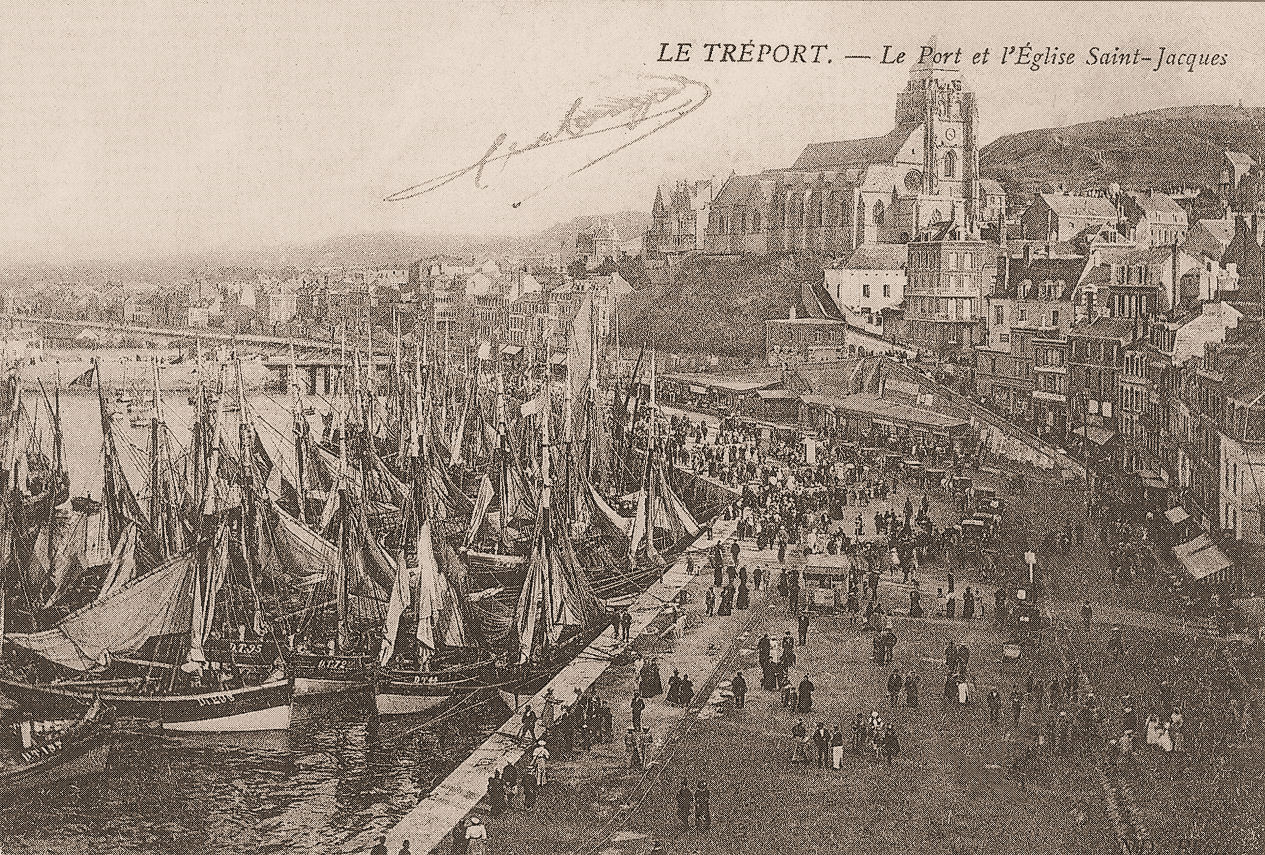
Le Tréport.

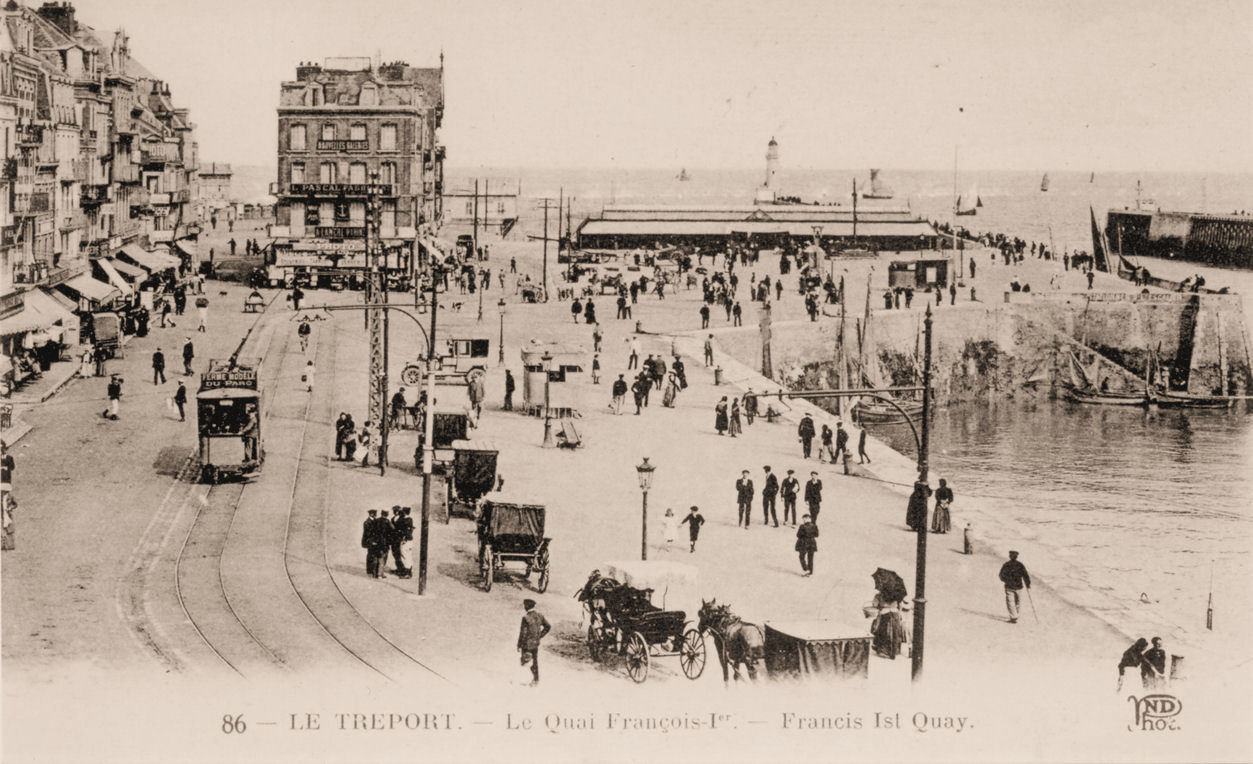
Quai François I.

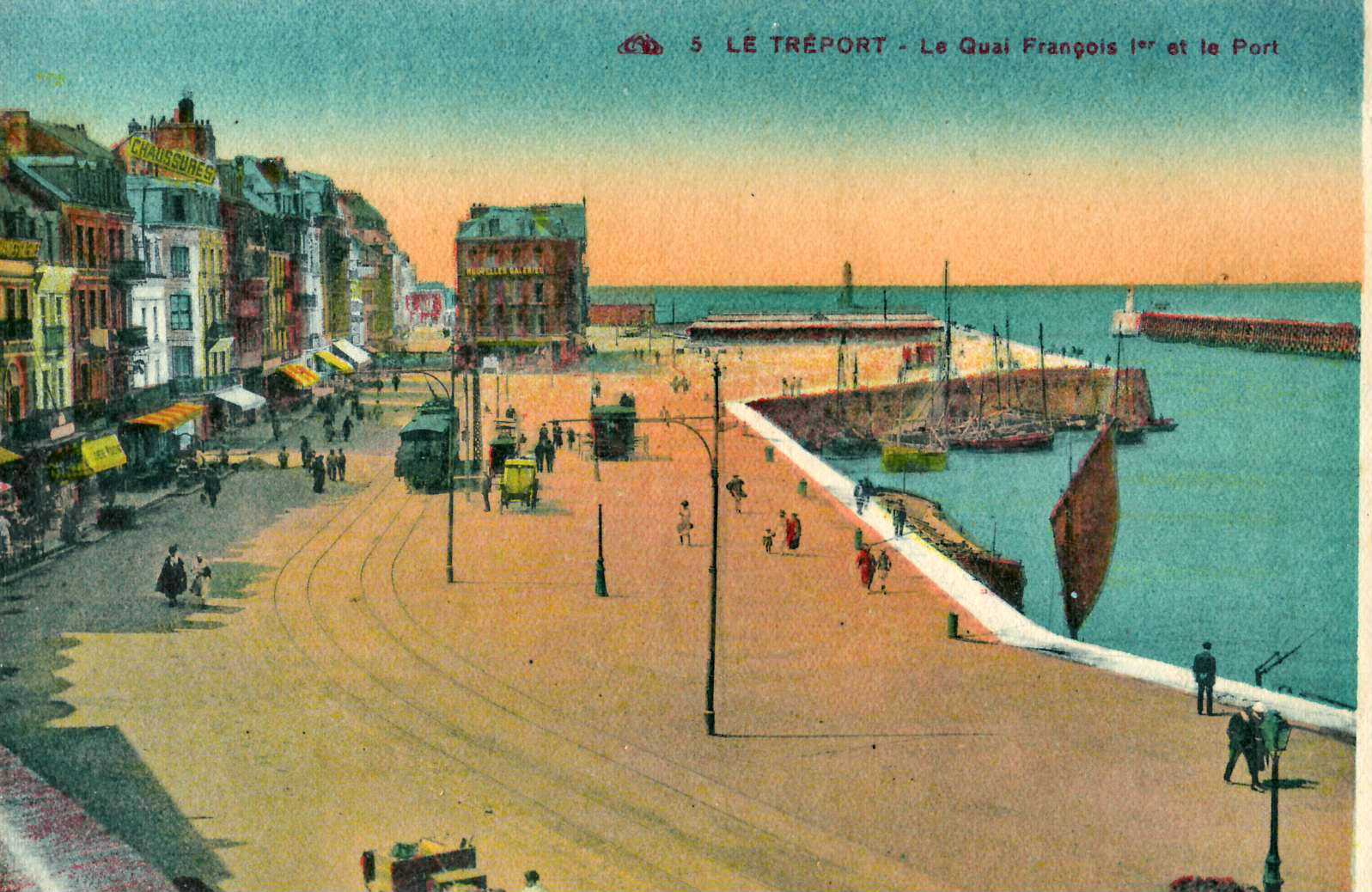
Quai François I.

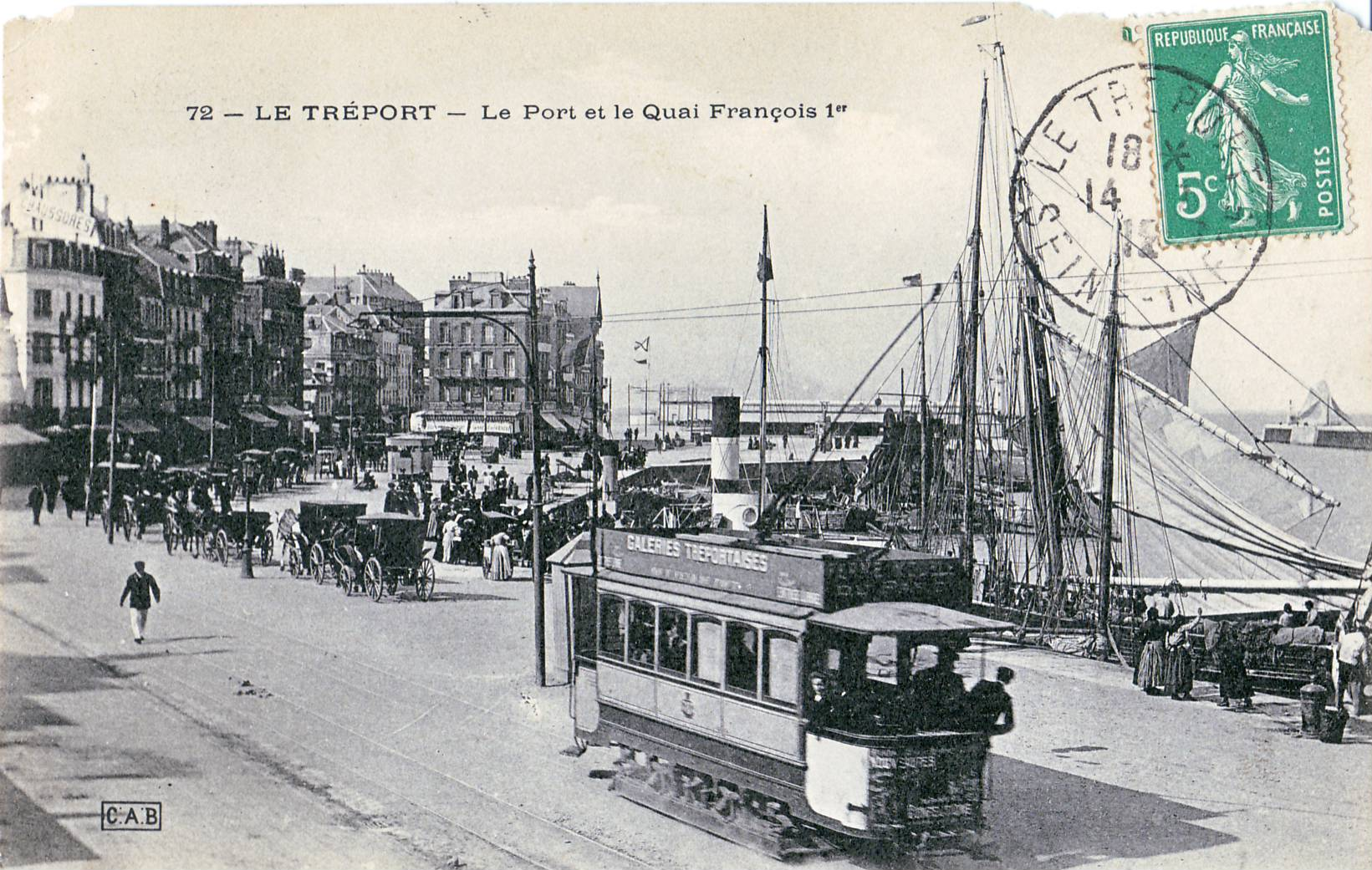
Harbor.

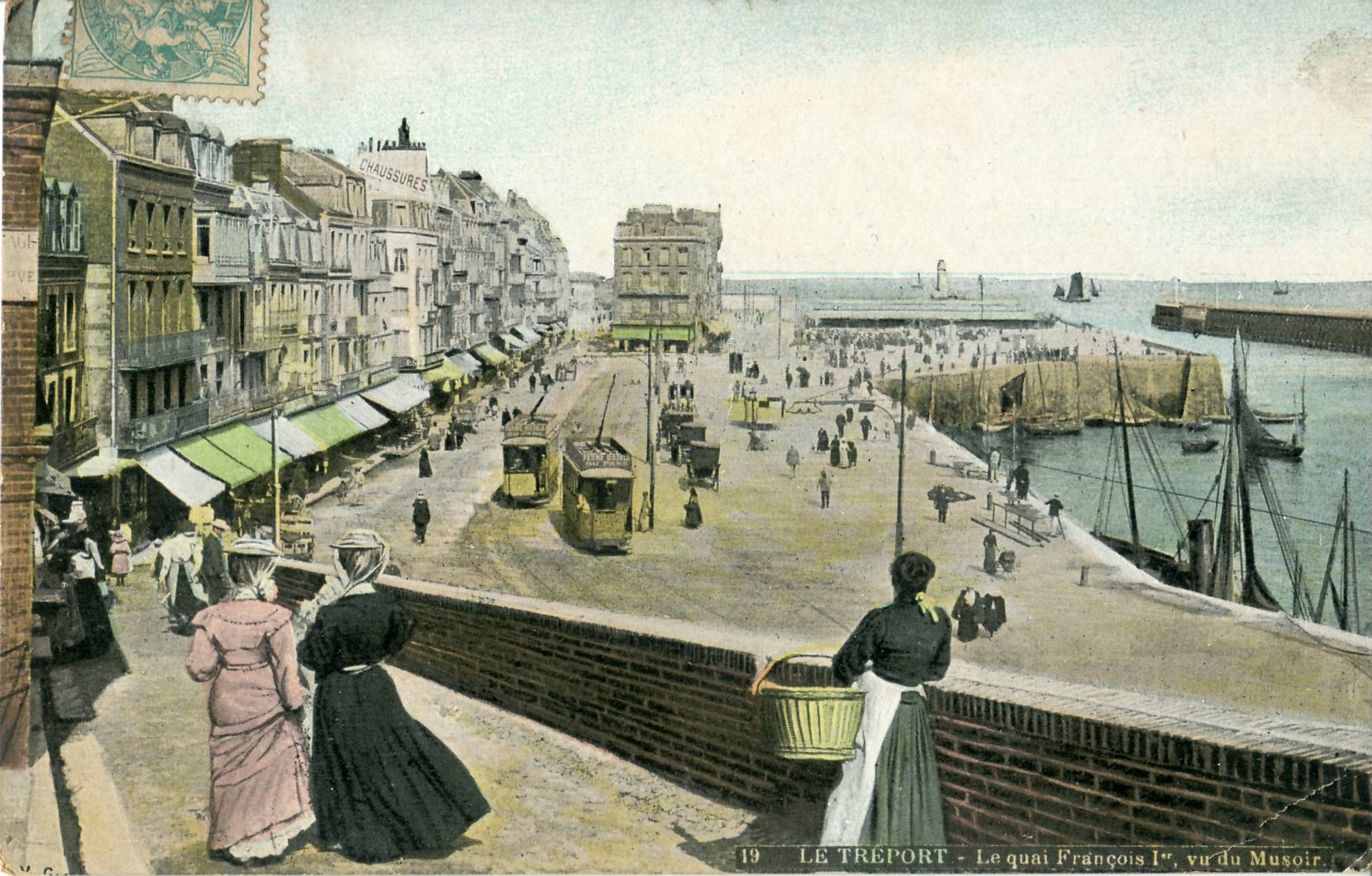
Harbor.

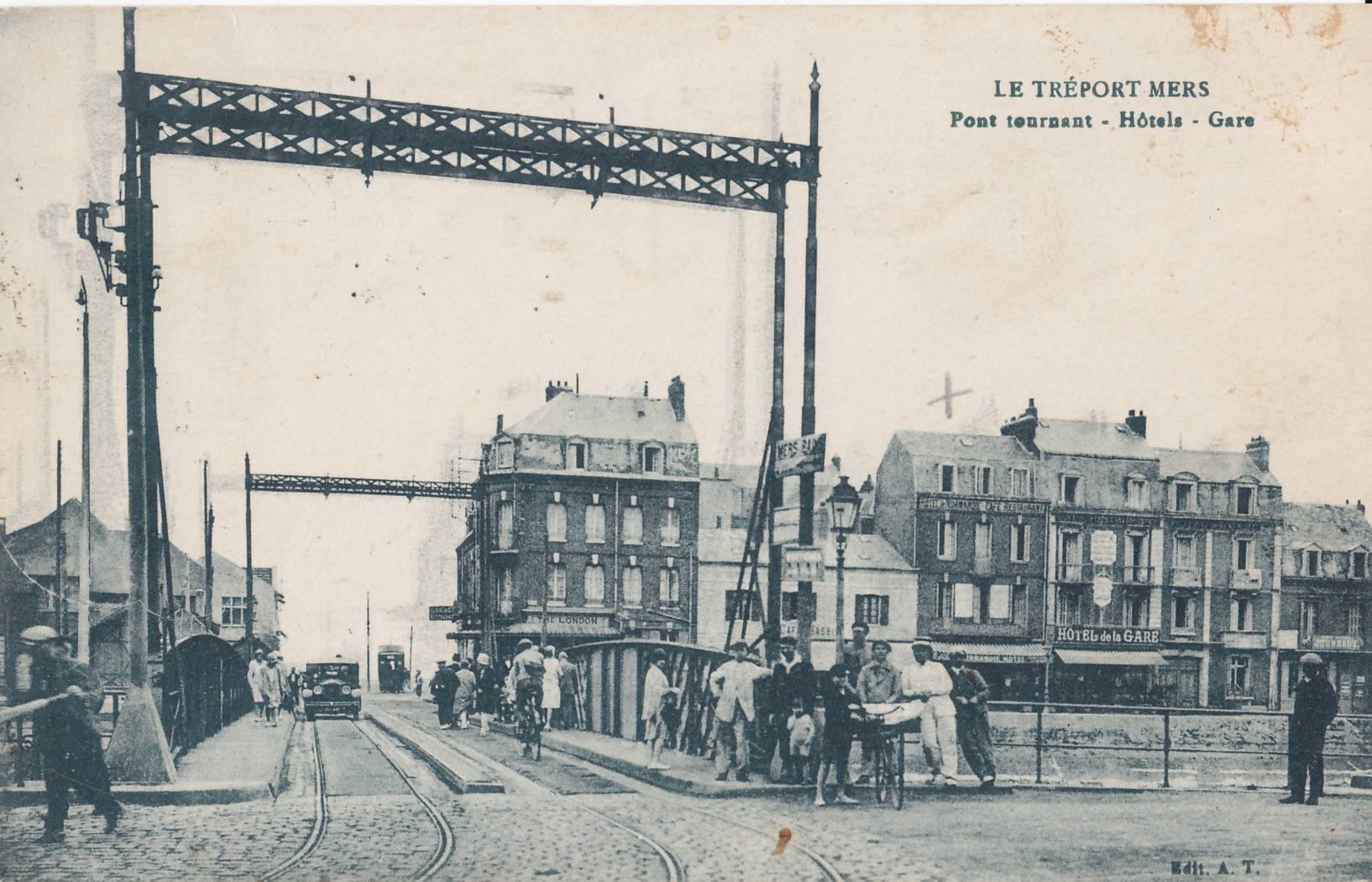
Travelers could reach Mers-les-Bains via the swing bridge, etc.

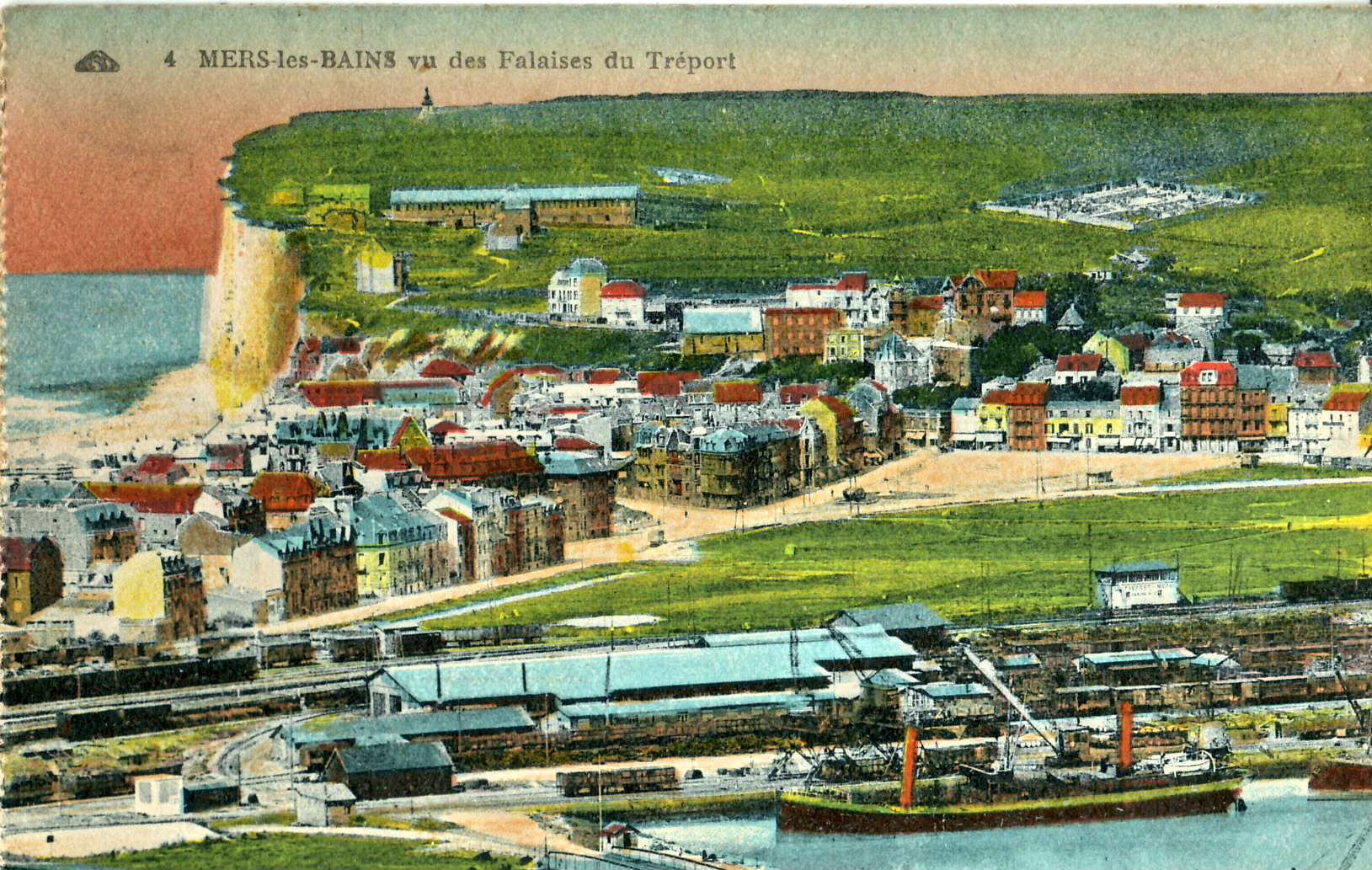
Mers-les-Bains.

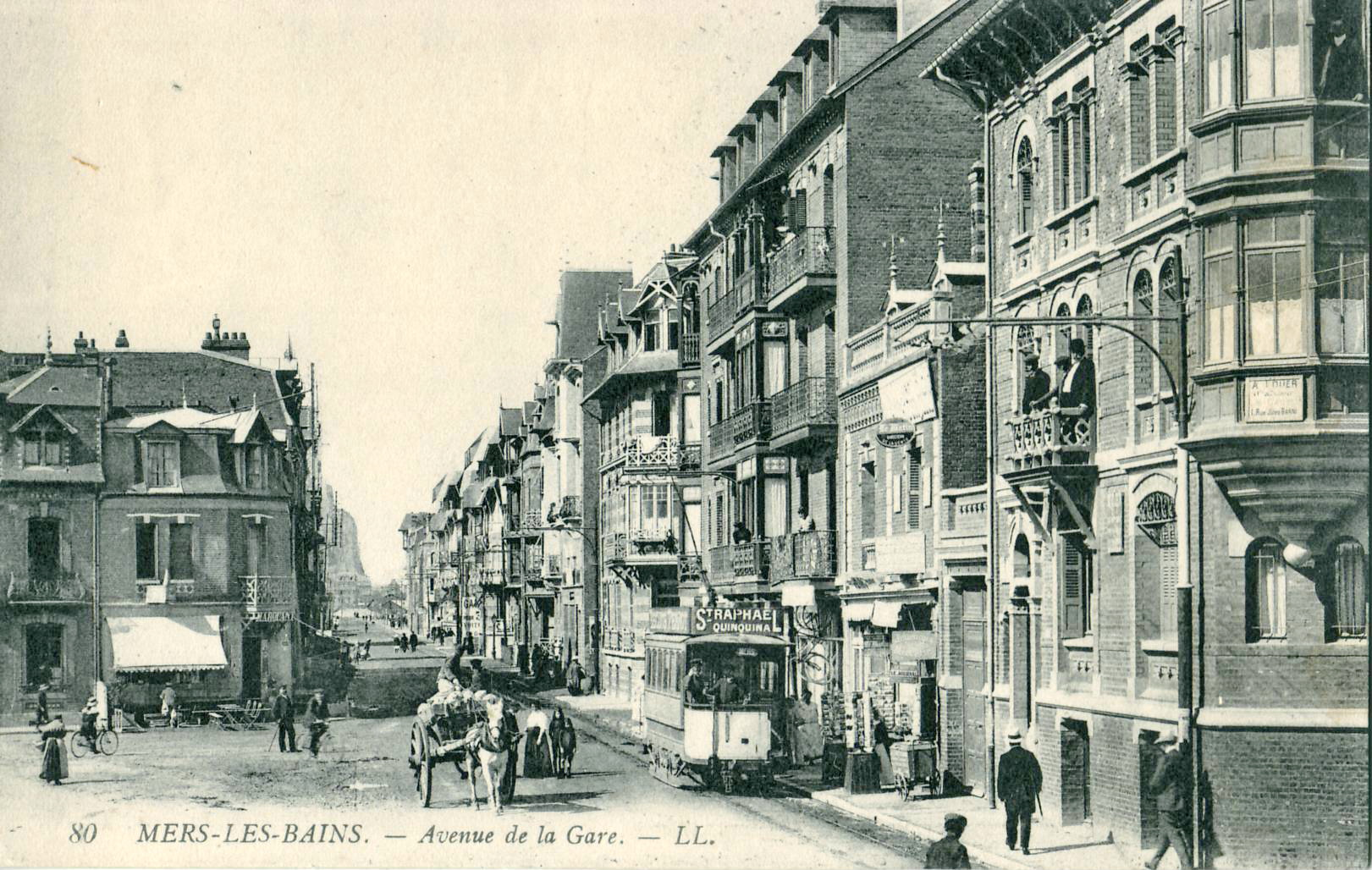
Rue de la Gare.

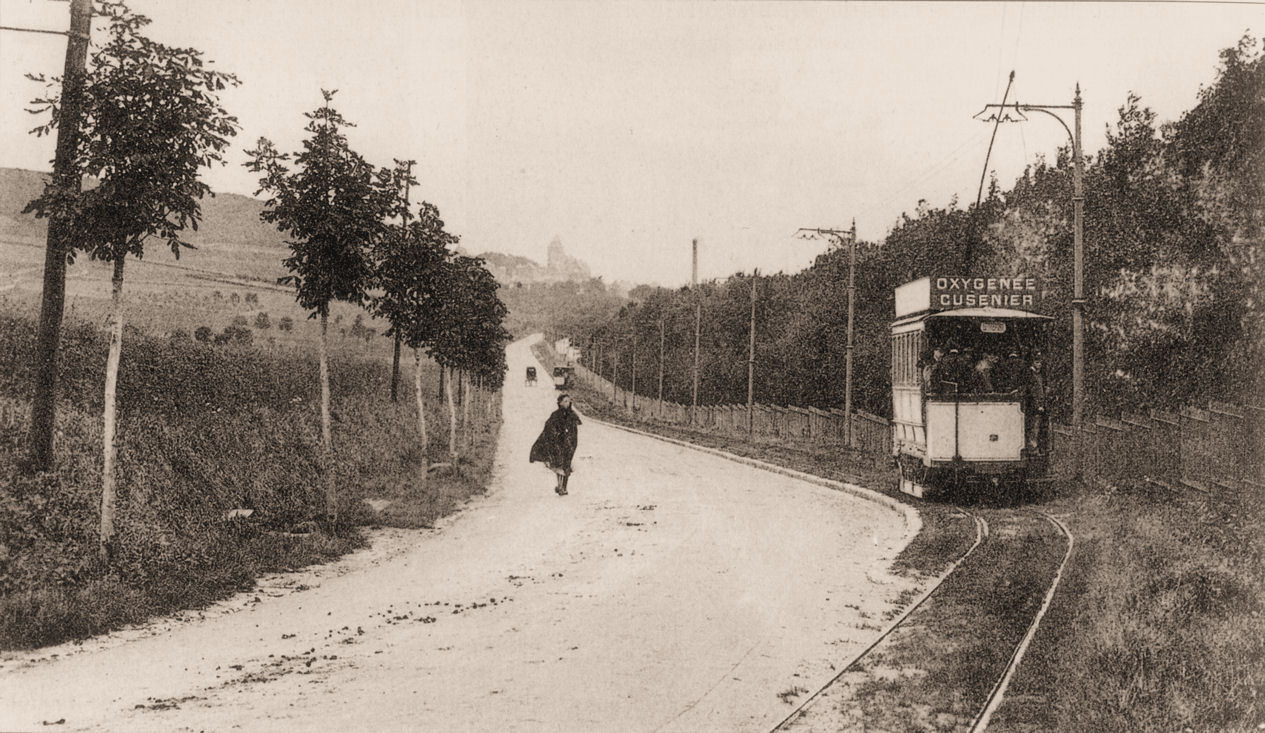
Route d'Eu.

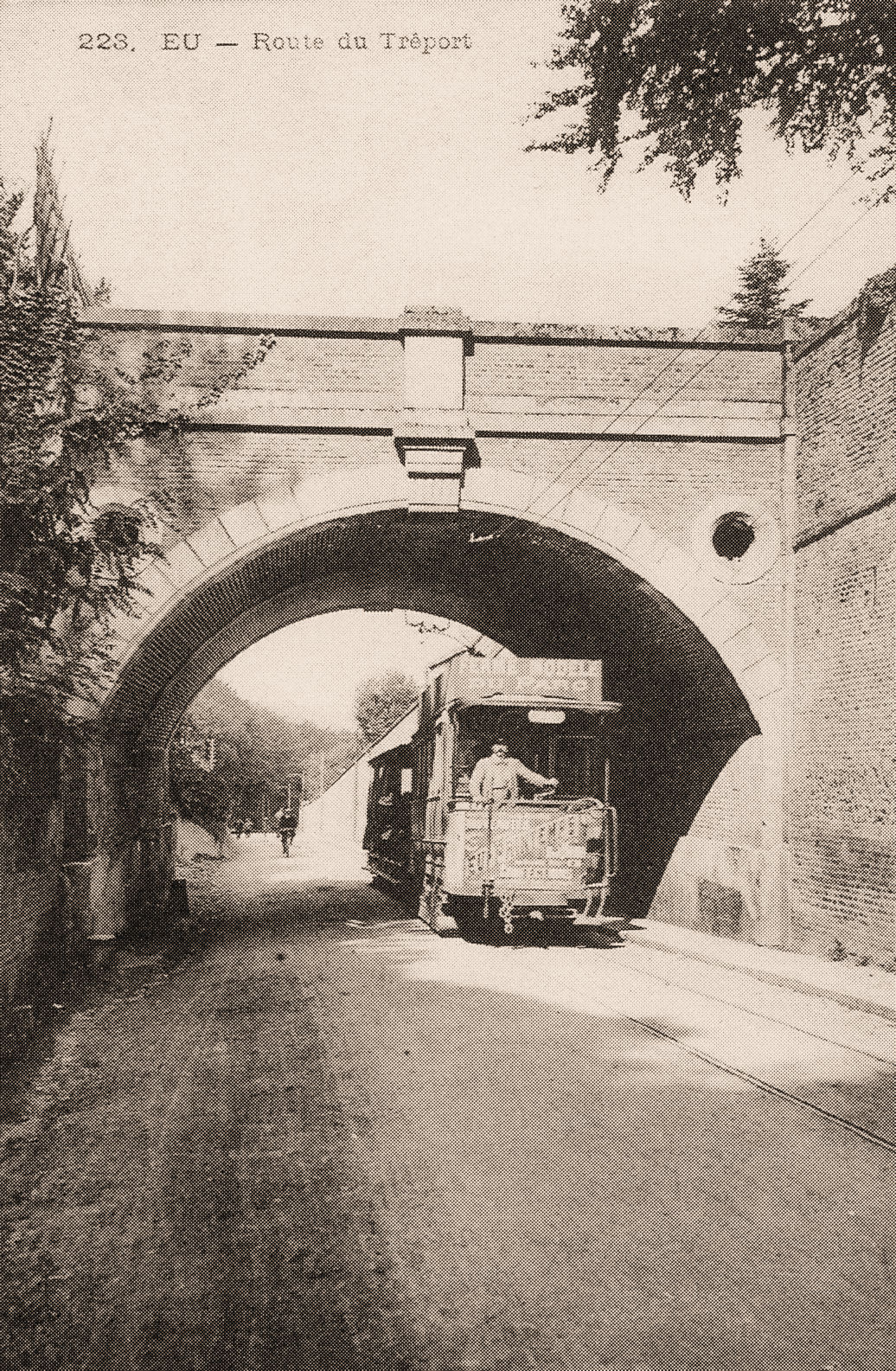
Wall of the Château d'Orléans.

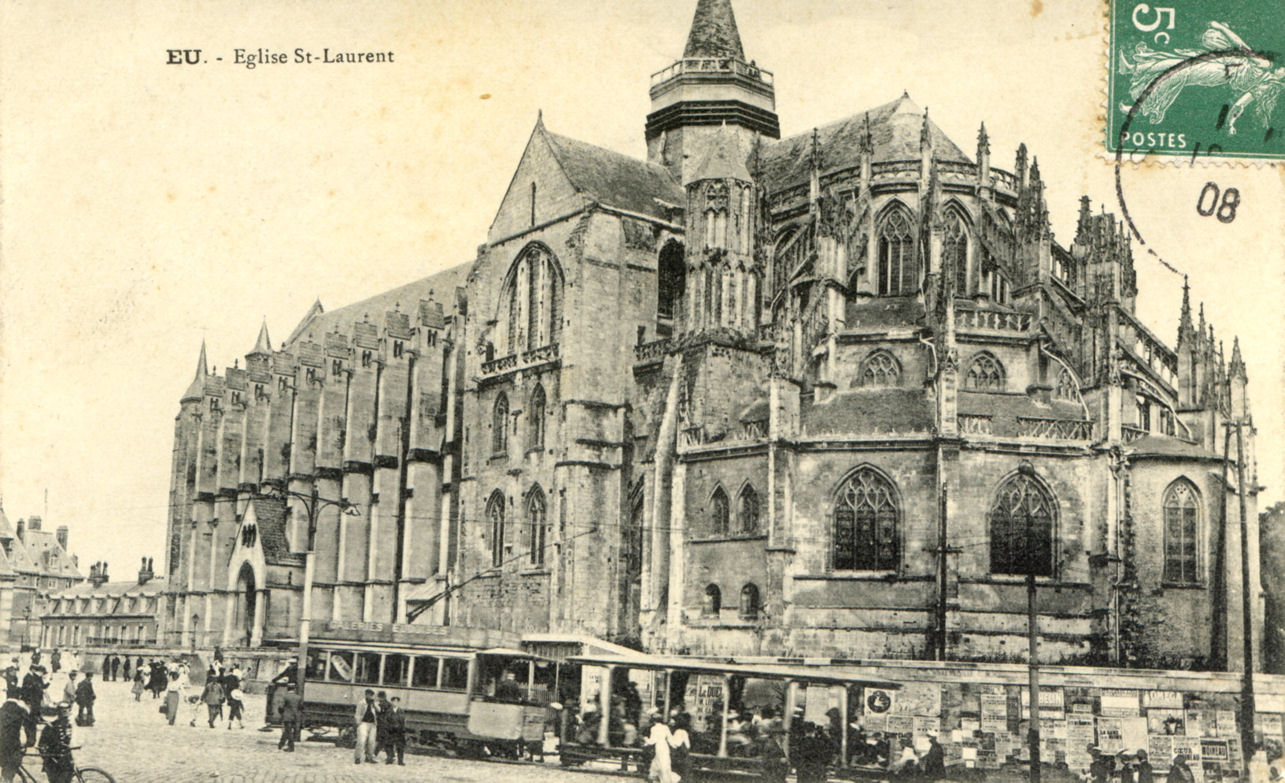
Center of town: the Place Carnot and its Gothic collegiate church.

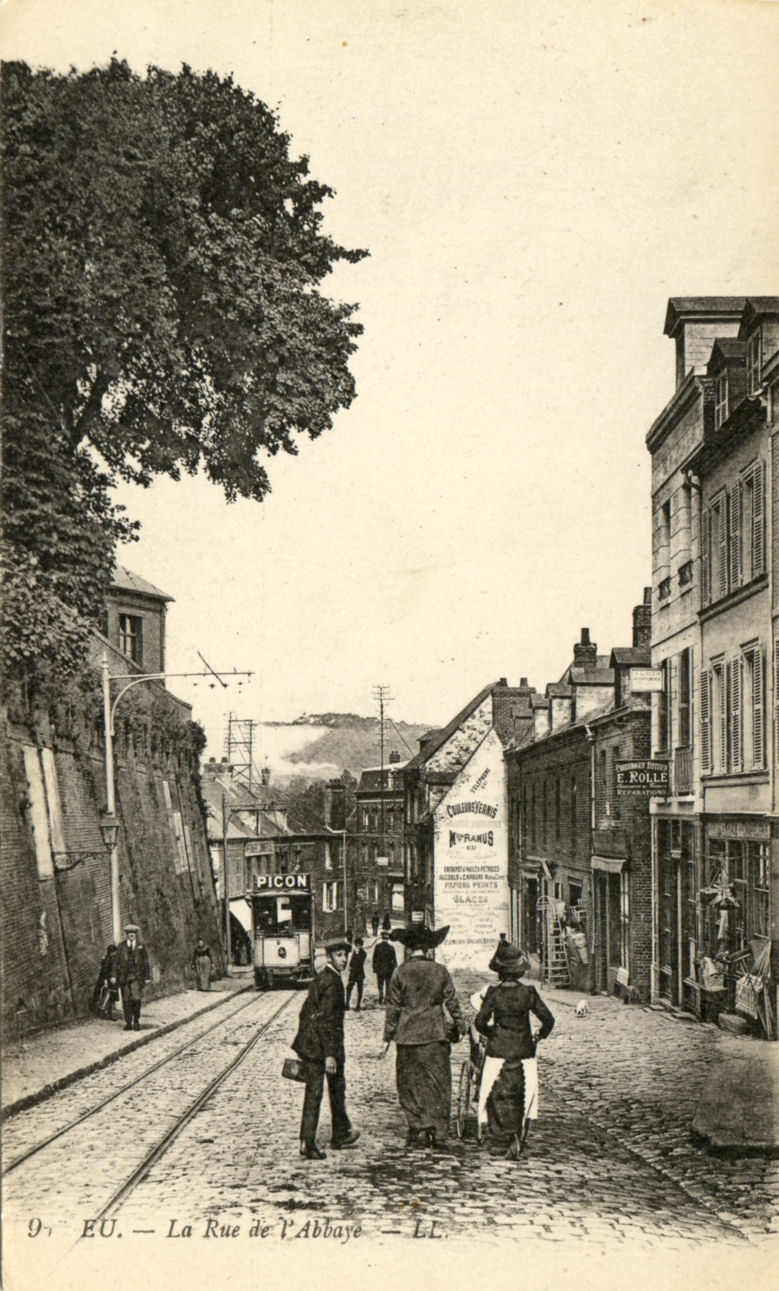
Rue de l'Abbaye, etc.

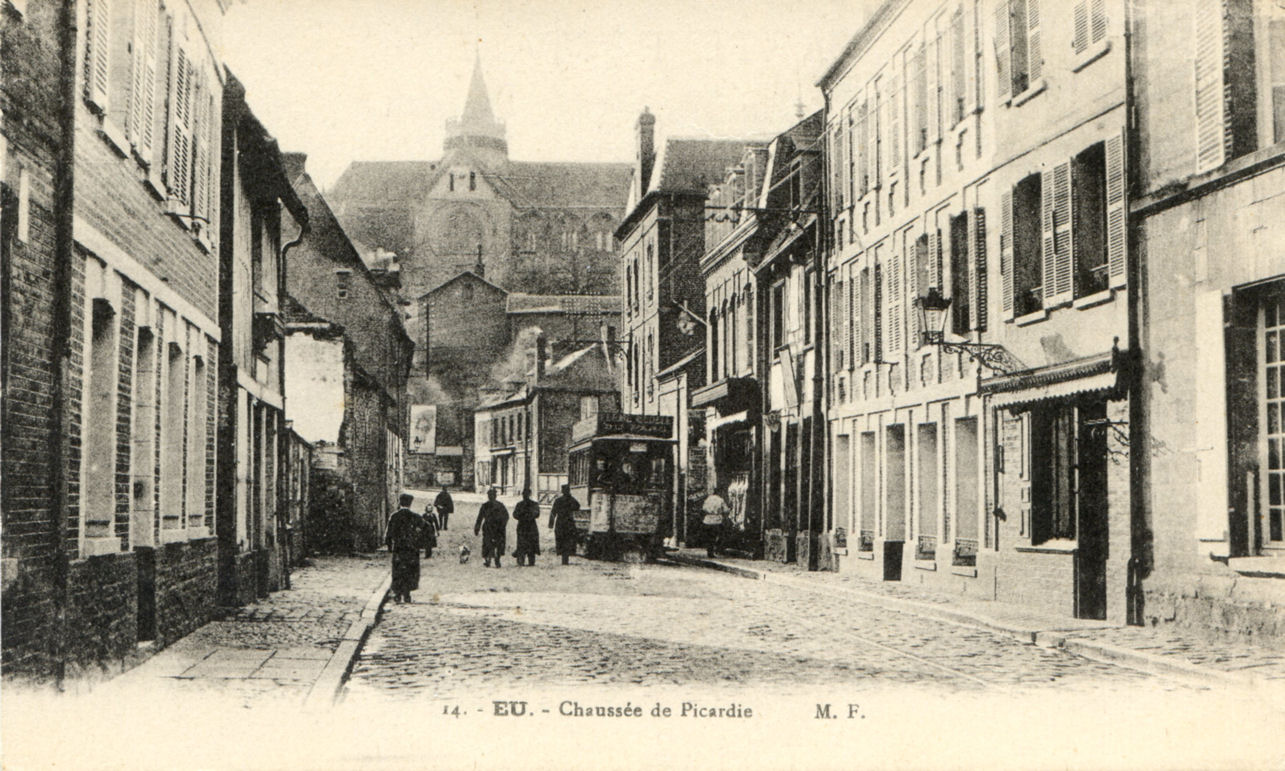
Chaussée de Picardie...

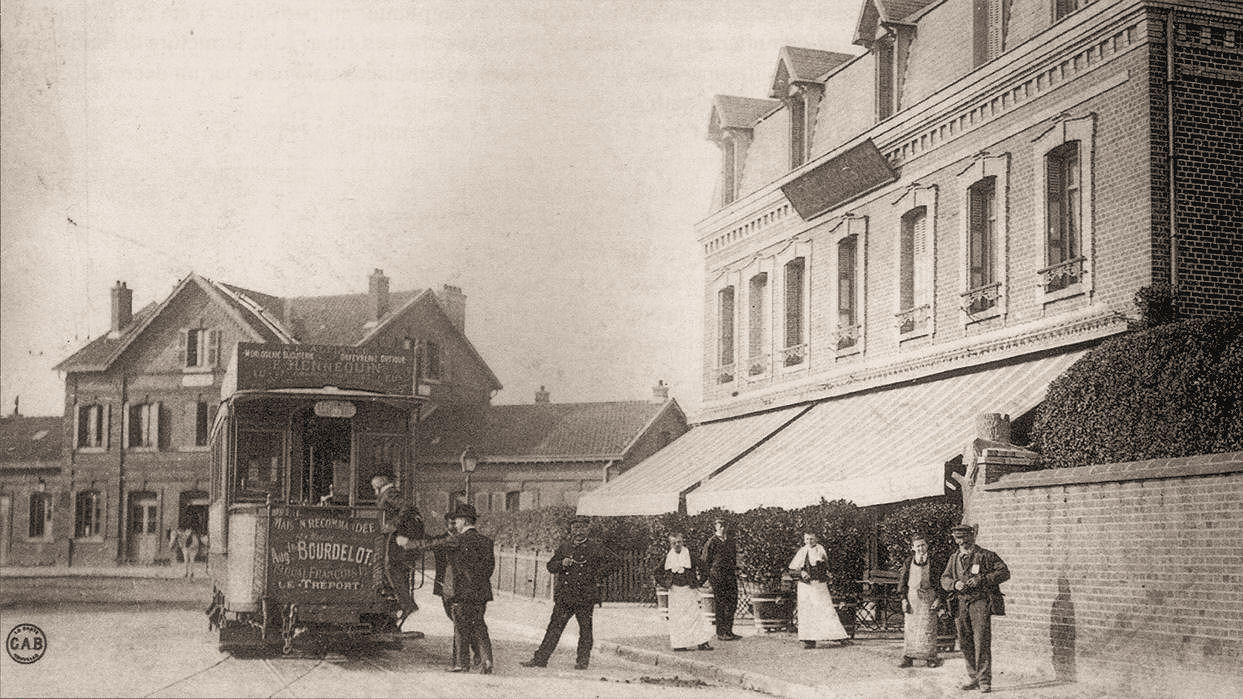
Eu-La Chaussée station, the line's terminus,

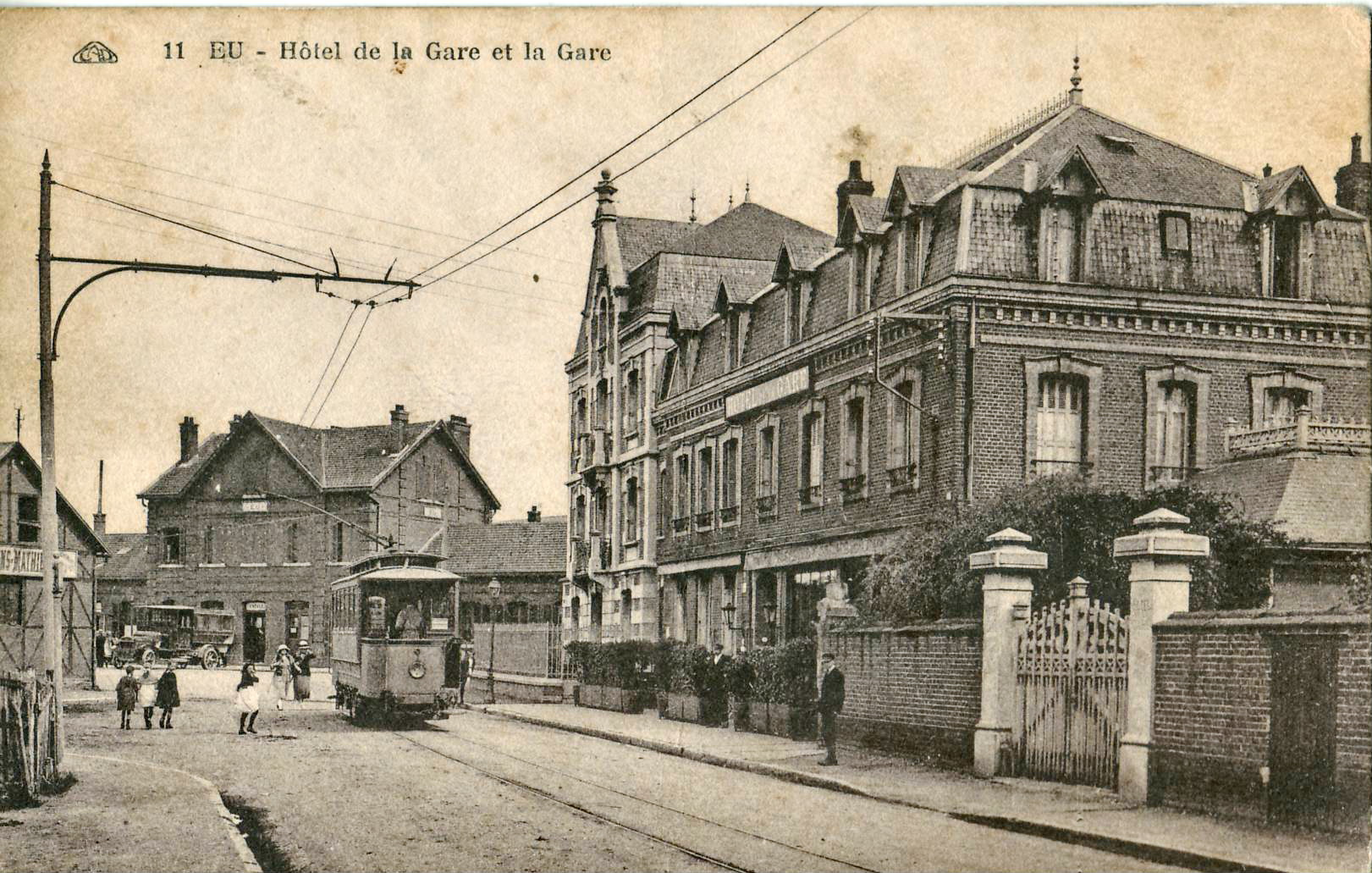
Postcard.

== See also ==
- Tram
- List of town tramway systems in France
- Trams in Rouen
- Le Havre tramway

== Bibliography ==
- Bertin, Hervé (1994). Petits trains et tramways haut-normands [Small trains and streetcars in Upper Normandy] (in French). Le Mans: Cénomane/La Vie du Rail. ISBN 2-905596-48-1.
- Chapuis, Jacques (1976). "Le tramway d'Eu au Tréport et à Mers" [The tramway from Eu to Tréport and Mers]. Chemins de fer régionaux et urbains (in French) (135). ISSN 1141-7447.
- Banaudo, José (2009). Sur les rails de Normandie [On the rails of Normandy] (in French). Breil-sur-Roya: Éditions du Cabri. ISBN 978-2-914603-43-0.
- Courant, René (1982). Le Temps des tramways [Time of the streetcars] (in French). Menton: Éditions du Cabri. ISBN 2-903310-22-X.
- No name (1994). Encyclopédie générale des transports : Chemins de fer [General Encyclopedia of Transportation: Railways] (in French). Vol. 12. Valignat: Éditions de l'Ormet. ISBN 2-906575-13-5.
