= Le Havre tramway =

Tram system in Le Havre, Normandy, France

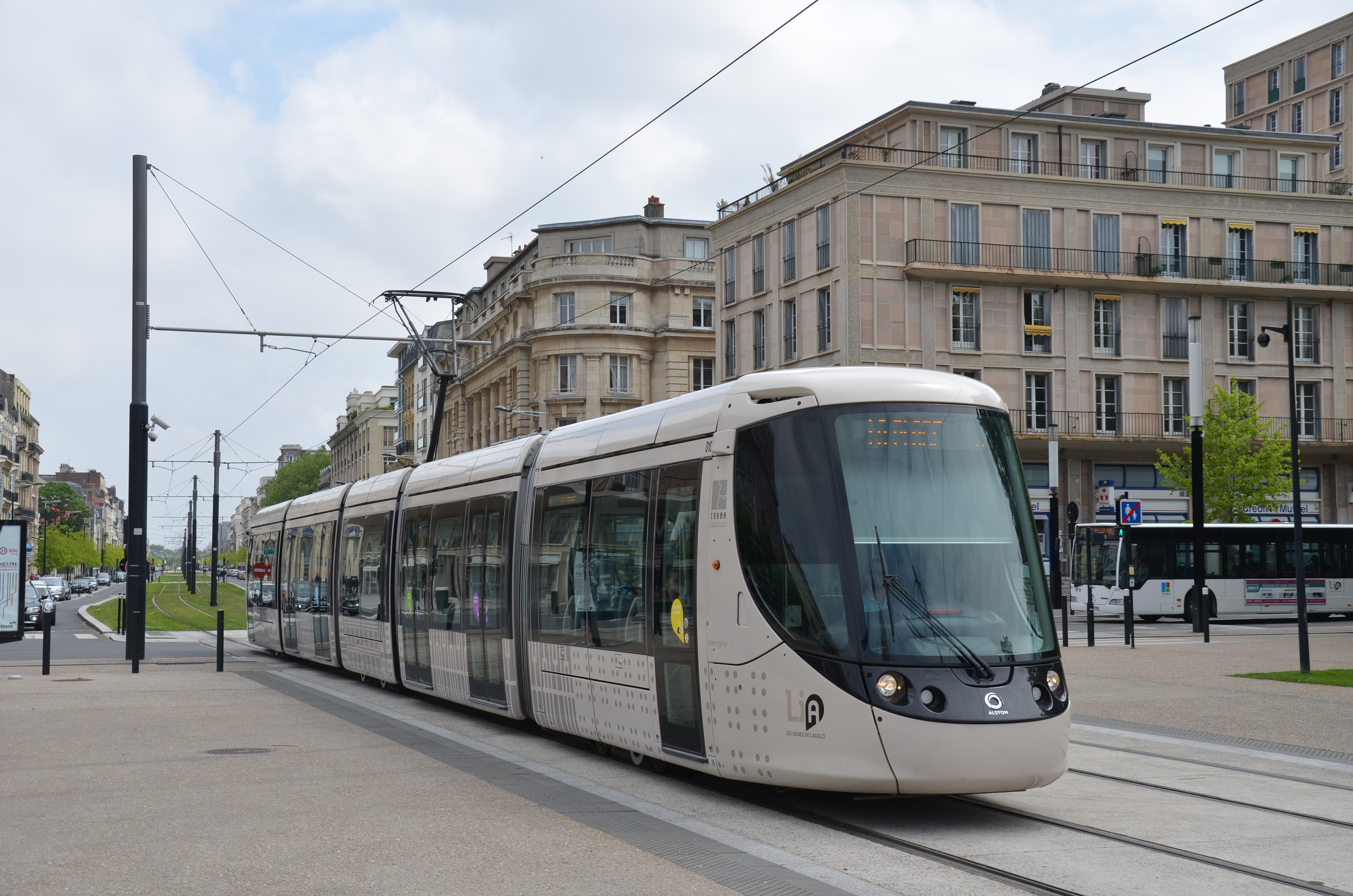
- Tram in the city centre of Le Havre

Overview
- Native name: Tramway du Havre
- Owner: Communauté de l'agglomération havraise
- Locale: Le Havre, Normandy, France
- Transit type: Tram
- Number of lines: 2
- Number of stations: 23
- Website: transports-lia.fr

Operation
- Began operation: 12 December 2012
- Operator: Transdev Le Havre
- Number of vehicles: 22 Alstom Citadis 302

Technical
- System length: 13 km (8.1 mi)
- Average speed: 19 km/h (12 mph)
- Top speed: 70 km/h (43 mph)
System map
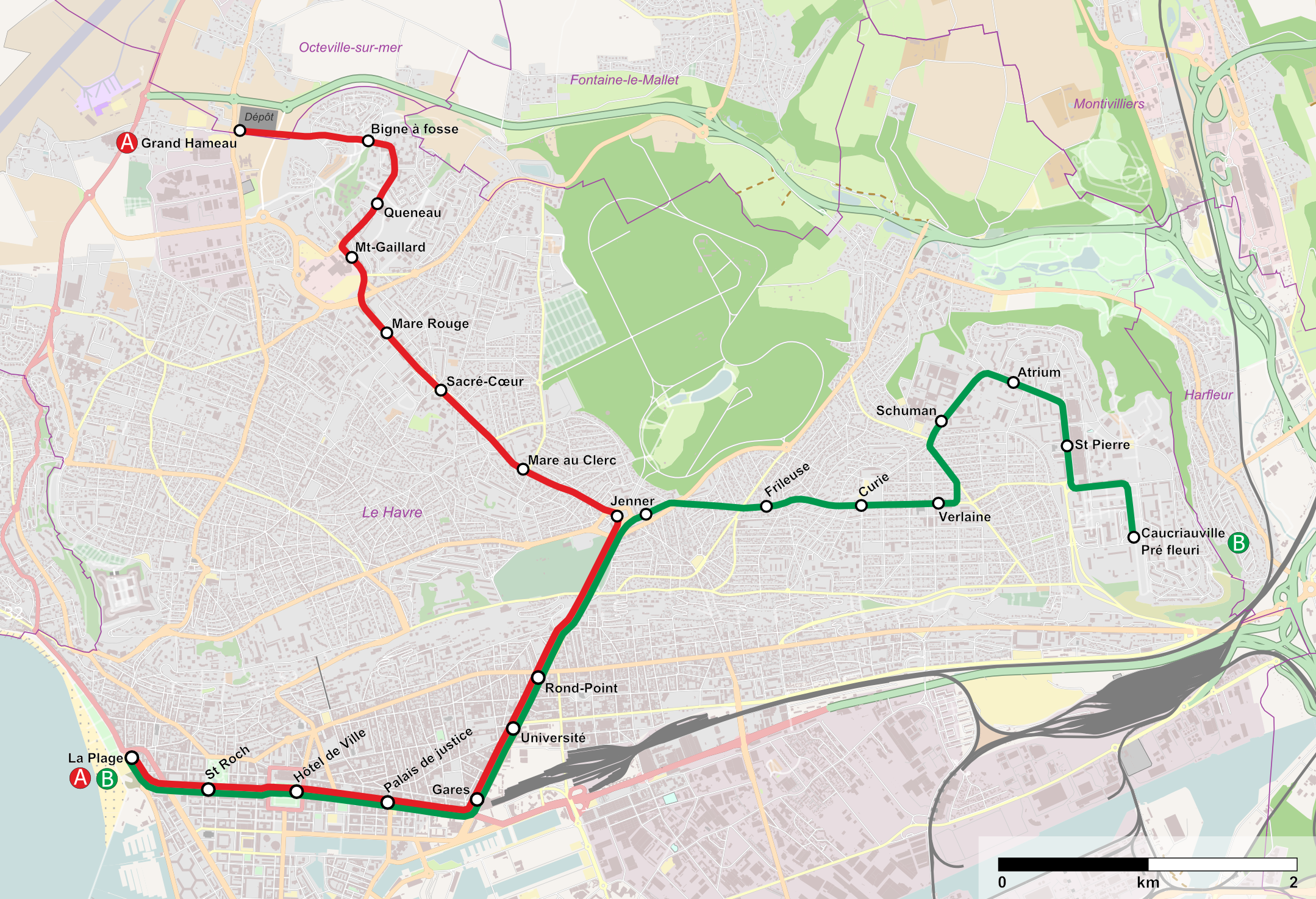
Map of Le Havre tramway

Le Havre tramway (French: Tramway du Havre) is a modern two-line tram system in the city of Le Havre in Normandy, France. The modern tramway opened on 12 December 2012.

Le Havre also had a first-generation tramway that was operated by Compagnie des Tramways Électriques du Havre (Electric Tramways Company of Le Havre), which opened in 1894. This historical tramway closed in 1957, and was replaced by trolleybuses as the main mode of public transport in Le Havre.

== History ==
=== Le Havre's original tramway ===
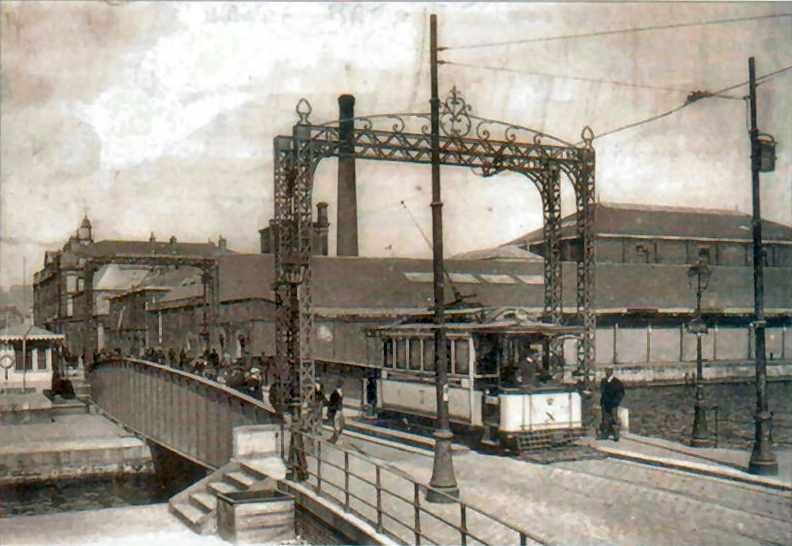
The former tramway of Le Havre

It is in 1832 that the first organised collective service began. An omnibus service between the Musée and the Octroi de Rouen (Boulevard de Graville). By 1860, the town was served by two lines.

In 1872, a Belgian businessman presented a tramway project to the municipal council. After authorisation was given, construction began with the first horse-drawn tramway opening on 1 February 1874 between Musée and the Barrière d’Or (Octroi de Rouen). A second line opened on the 15th of the same month between the town hall and the Rond-Point. Le Havre was the fourth city in France to possess a tramway network after Paris, Lille and Nancy.

The network of lines spread over the city of Le Havre and its neighbouring suburbs. The tramway lines all led to Le Havre Station and the town hall.

The company operated a fleet of single car trams.

Operations were severely disrupted after the bombardments of 1944, but the 7 lines were reopened as soon as the end of 1946.

=== Trolleybuses in Le Havre ===
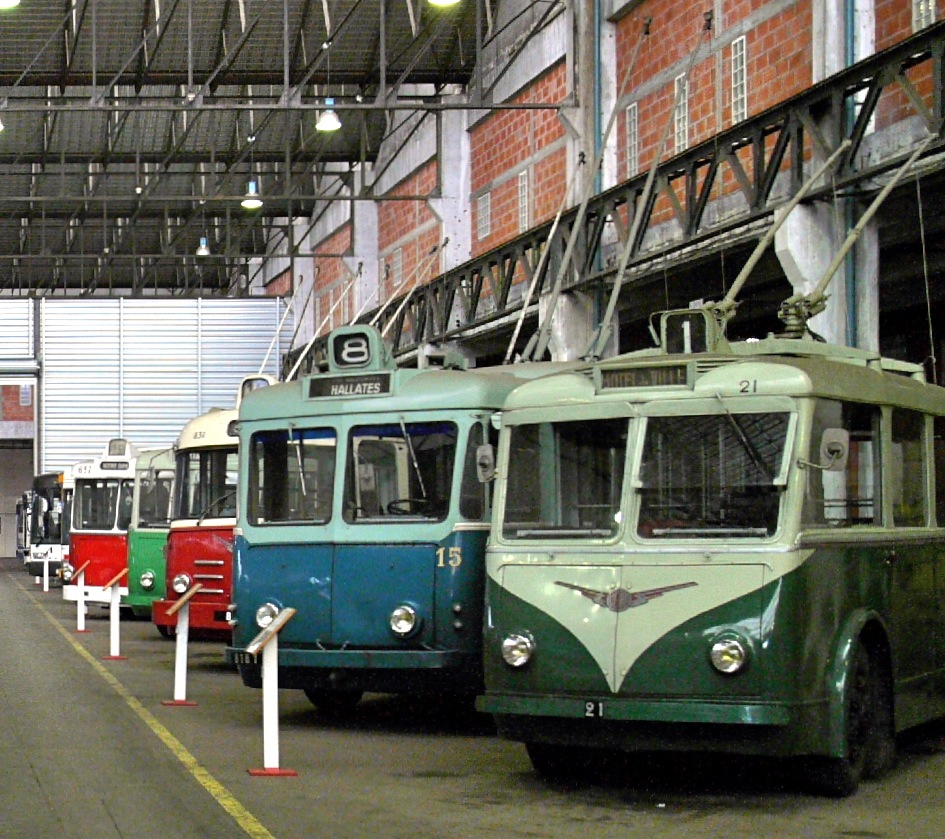
Le Havre trolleybus 15 (in centre), among vehicles from other French cities, preserved at a museum in the Paris area

On 1 August 1947, line 8 (Gare – Hallates) closed to let trolleybus takeover. On 5 May 1951, line 6 (Gare – Bléville), then on 14 August 1957 line 5 (Gare – La Hêtraie) were also converted to trolleybus operation.

Secondhand Vétra CS60 and new VBRh formed the bulk of the trolleybus network. In 1960, four Chausson-Vétra APV trolleybuses were introduced. In the following years, the CGFT acquired more rolling stock from other networks, in Marseille and Strasbourg.

=== Closing of Le Havre's original system ===
In Le Havre as well as in cities across France, increase in car transport encouraged Le Havre city council to set up one-way streets. The tramway and trolleybus operator was faced with a large bill to extend its network further into the suburbs and so decided to replace all its overhead vehicles with motor buses on 28 December 1970.

=== New tramway ===
==== Consultation ====
From mid-November 2006 to the end of the March 2007, a survey of inhabitants living in the Le Havre metropolitan area was conducted about a proposal to construct a new bus lane. Following the survey, an information campaign was launched.

On 13 March 2007, the deliberations of elected representatives from CODAH lead to a consensus on a certain number of key points.

Concerning the infrastructure, the construction of a new tunnel was earmarked to the east of the existing road Tunnel Jenner to guarantee a link between the upper and the lower parts of the city. The layout of the route was designed in a 'Y' shape, with the possibility of moving the terminus of the line to the upper part of the city.

Following the various inquiries, it was apparent that residents wanted a mode of transport that was frequent, efficient, comfortable and large. On 2 May, CODAH launched a call for tenders to construct the new network. On 10 July, the railway option was selected.

==== Structural axis ====
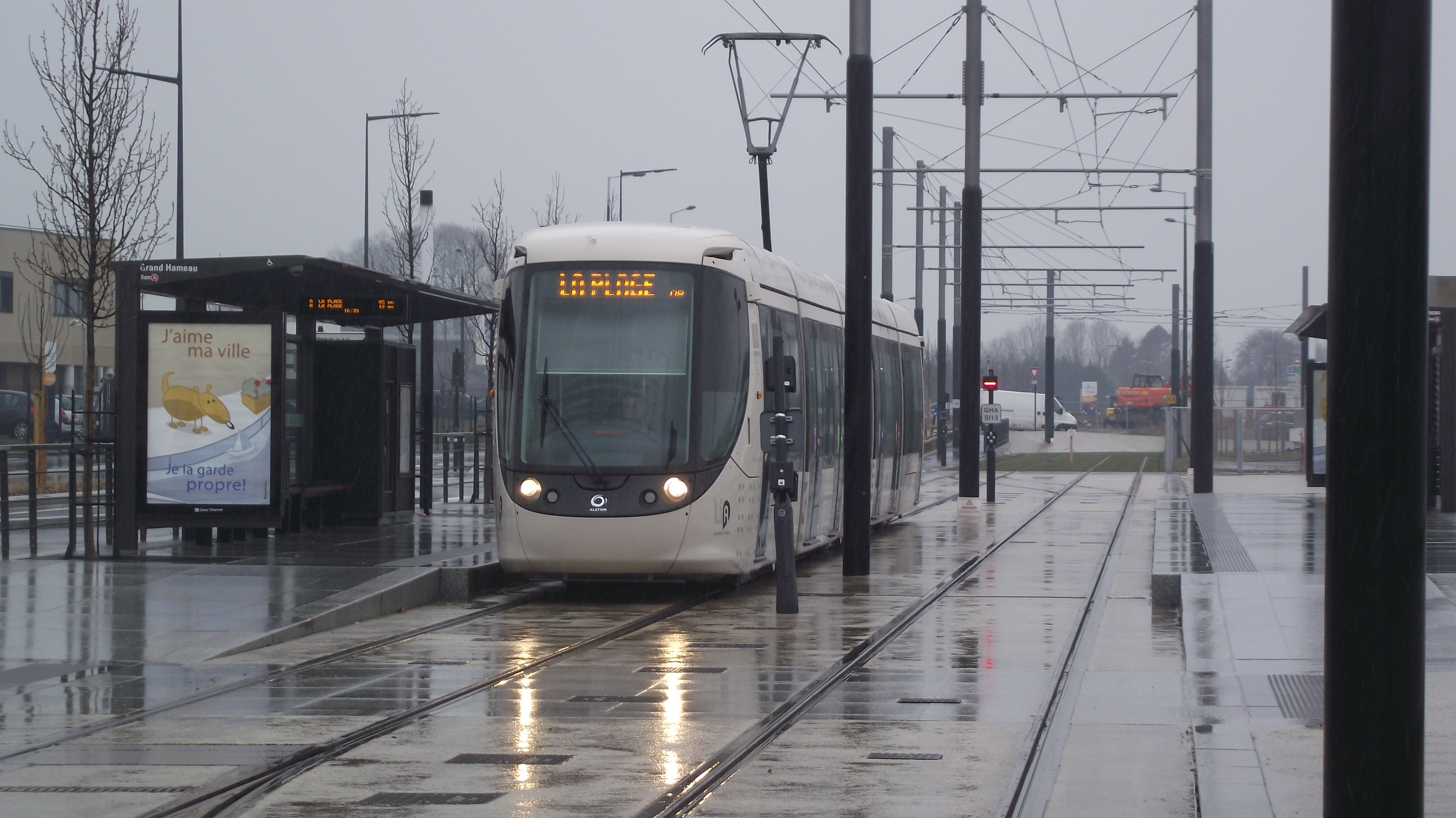
Tramway at the Grand Hameau station

The layout is designed to encompass a large population base. It connects hubs like the beach, the city hall, railway station and major population areas of Caucriauville and Mont Gaillard, in the upper city.

The introduction of the tramway to the suburbs in the upper city coincides with a major redevelopment scheme to deprived areas of the city. In October 2004 the National Agency for Urban Renewal (ANRU) signed with the municipality of Le Havre the first agreement to finance the rehabilitation of these areas. This finance agreement provides more than 340 million euros for the housing estates in the northern districts, where about 41,000 people reside. The development extends the budget for the Grand Projet de Ville (GPV) for the demolition and rebuilding of more than 1,700 homes.

The tramway also plays an important role in linking the upper town with the lower town and offers an alternative form of urban transport. Nearly 90,000 inhabitants live less than five minutes from a station, of which 16,000 are pupils and students. The entire line has been designed logically to allow interconnection with other modes of transport such as the train station or the park and ride at Octeville, as well as with the all existing bus lines run by CODAH (LiA network), and the railway lines to other parts of the Haute-Normandie region such as Yvetot and Rouen, and beyond to Paris.

The entire route is lined with 2,300 trees, 17,000 shrubs and 50,000 various plants.

== Construction ==
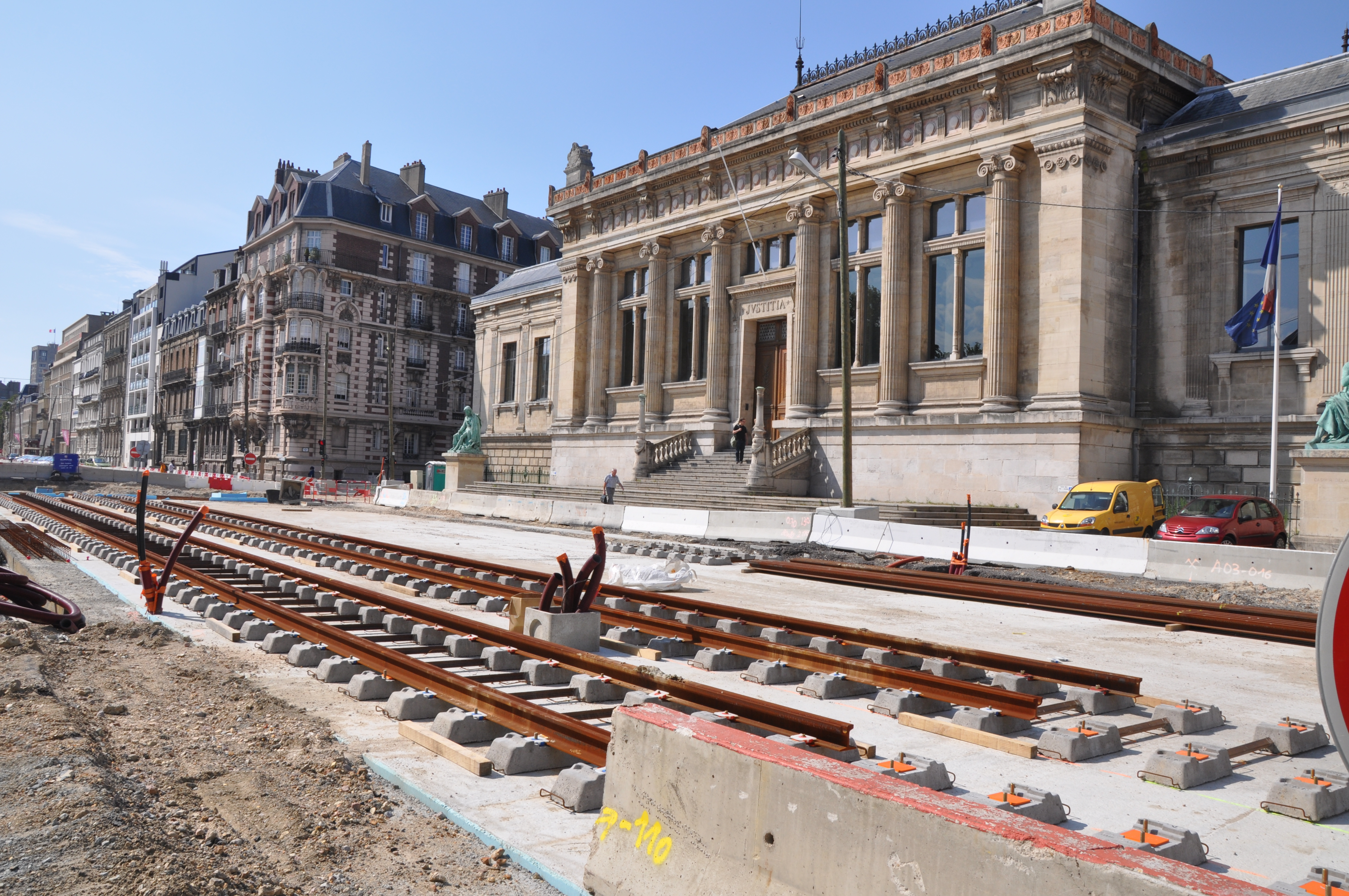
Construction of the new tramway in front of the Palais de Justice

Surveying of the ground began on 1 September 2008. In February 2009, the definitive route of the new tramway was known, as well as the plans for the proposed layout. In 2010, the first preparatory works began, diverting gas and water pipes. The estimated date that the tramway would start operating was December 2012. Meanwhile, the bus network was restructured to offer a better service to the areas not provided by the new tramway.

In October, a new website was launched, providing updates on the progress of the project, and included a virtual journey.

A team of 8 tramway ambassadors was put together in order to reassure and update residents and shopkeepers on the progress of the construction.

=== Changes to road routes ===
In order to ensure the best circulation of traffic during the construction of the tramway lines, changes were made between June and September 2009 to the layout of the route from the Boulevard Francois I to the Chaussée Georges Pompidou. The changes included: the installation of traffic lights; the removal of the roundabout at the junction of Boulevard Francois I and Chaussée Kennedy; the widening of lanes on the Quai de Southampton, Quai de l'Île and the Quai de Casimir Delavigne and a one-way layout on the Chausée Georges Pompidou. In addition, cycle lanes and pedestrian crossings were added.

=== The new tunnel ===
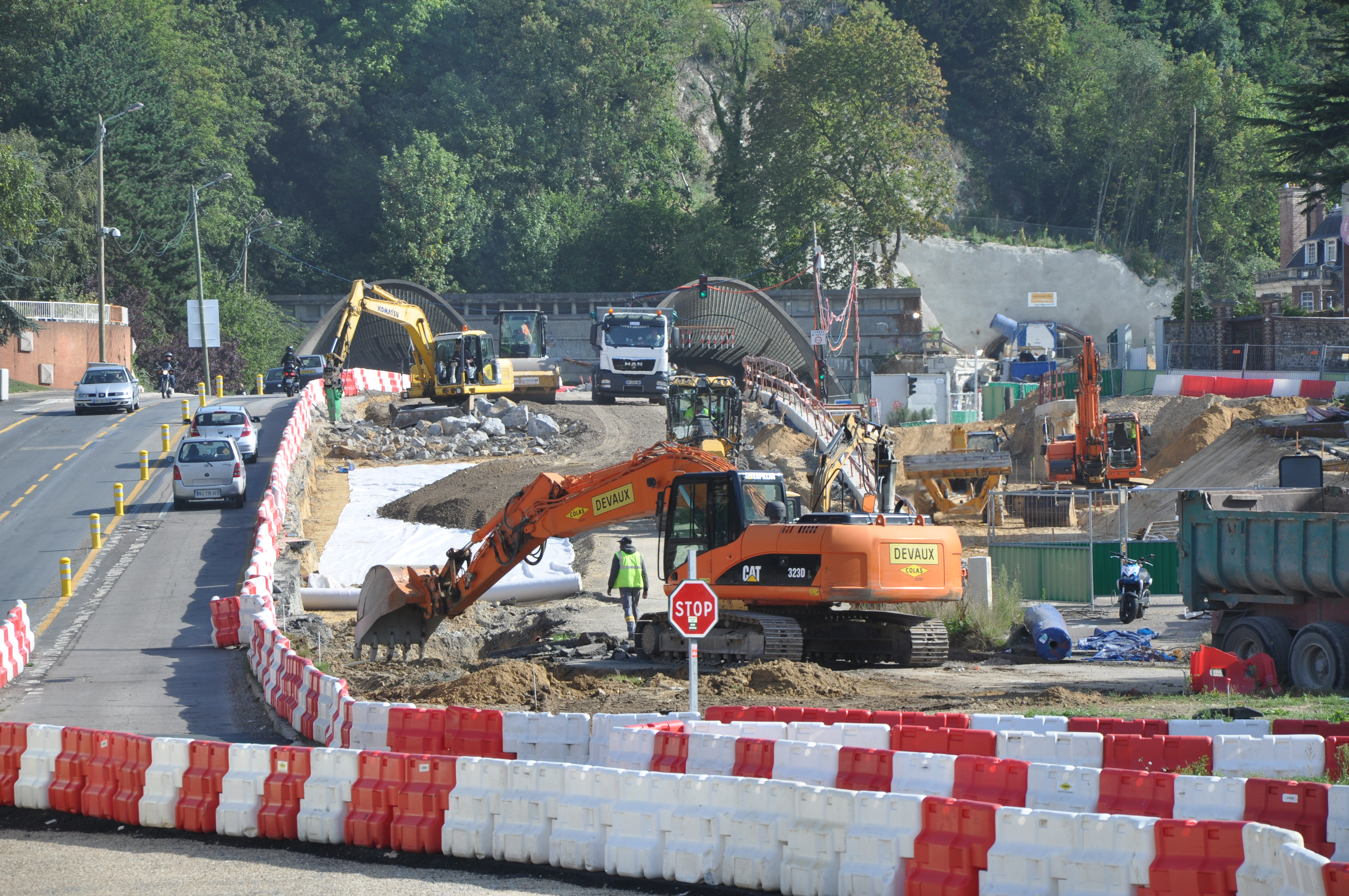
Drilling of the new tunnel, to the right of the existing tunnel

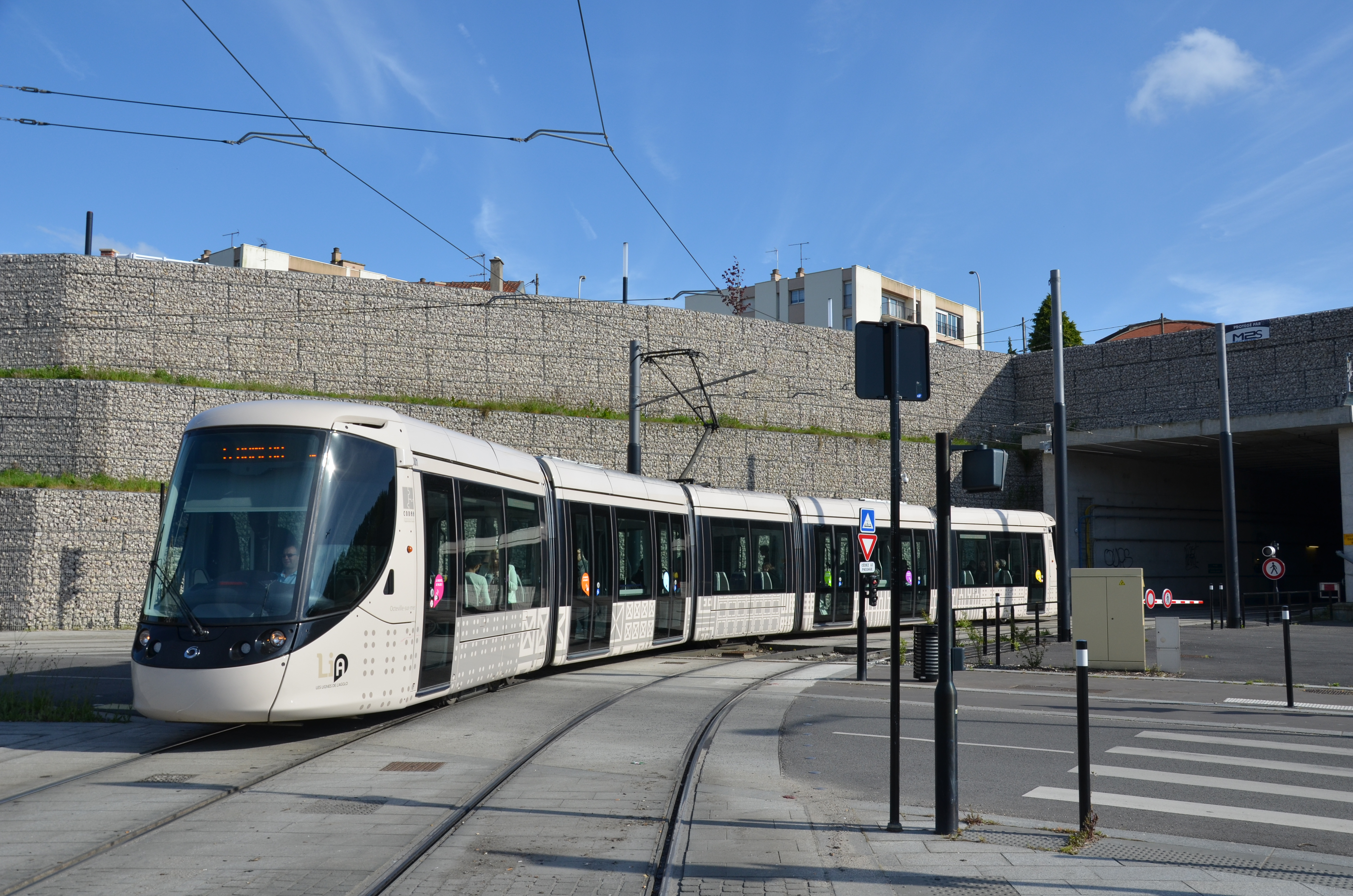
A tram exiting the new tunnel at Place Jenner

The main project of the construction of the new tramway was the tunnel. It is more than 500 metres long, built east of the existing tunnel Jenner and entirely reserved for the new tramway. The drilling was completed in November 2011.

The mairie of Le Havre was responsible for all planning work necessary: layout of the road and surrounding area; diversion of underground networks; and access to the new tunnel.

=== Stations ===
The construction of the stations began in May 2012. The installation was carried out by Clear Channel Communications. Over three days, it took place in several stages. The construction of the platforms was specially designed to meet the demands of disabled people (with wheelchair access) and the visually impaired with the installation of tactile paving.

=== Costs ===
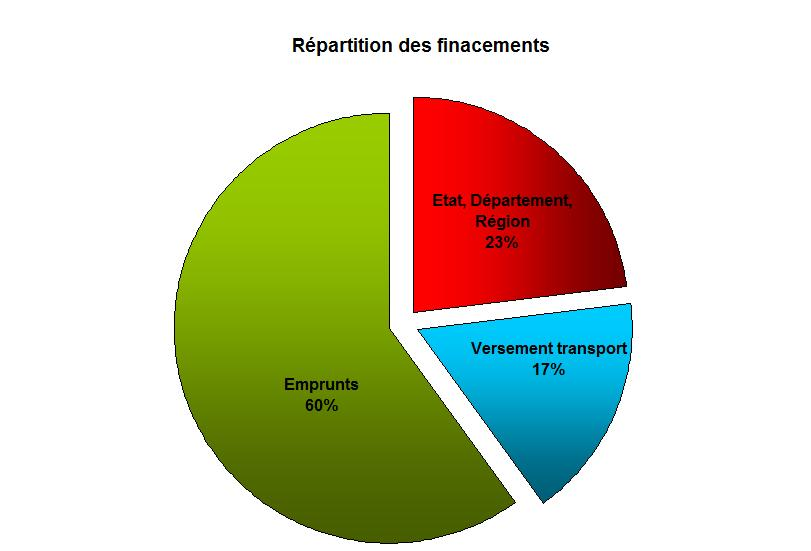
Distribution of the funds

The total cost of the construction of the tramway was €395 million. Funding came from three sources: CODAH provided €237 million; state and local authorities from the region Haute-Normandie and the département Seine-Maritime provided €90.85 million; business in the Le Havre metropolitan area, through a transport tax, provided €67.15 million.

== Network ==
The network consists of two standard gauge lines of a total length of 13 km and 23 stations. It is electrified through an overhead contact line of 750 V. The tram runs on a flat piece of land surrounded by grass on the Avenue Foch, the Boulevard de Strasbourg and the Avenue Bois au Coq.

=== The Lines ===
Route of the Le Havre tramway

The section shared by lines A and B part depart from the beach towards the train station, along the Boulevard de Strasbourg, the Hôtel de Ville, the Sous-préfecture et the Palais de Justice, then along the Cours de la République and the new tunnel. The line then splits in two:

- Line A towards Mont-Gaillard (near the airport and the new hospital);
- Line B towards Caucriauville (replacing the former bus route 8 which used bendy buses).

List of stations
Shared section A/B (La Plage – Jenner)	Line A branch (Jenner – Grand Hameau)	Line B branch (Jenner – Caucriauville – Pré fleuri)
La Plage	Place Jenner (west)	Place Jenner (east)
Saint-Roch	Mare au clerc	Frileuse
Hôtel de ville	Sacré-cœur	Curie
Palais de justice	Mare rouge	Verlaine
Gare	Mont-Gaillard	Schuman
Université	Quesneau	Atrium
Rond-point	Bigne à fosse	Saint-Pierre
Tunnel Jenner	Grand Hameau	Caucriauville – Pré fleuri

=== Expansion ===
Even before the first two lines were constructed, in 2008 a third line was envisaged, to serve the south of the city. As with the first two lines, it would coincide with a redevelopment project. The proposed Line C would follow the same route as the bus route 3 from the bus station to Stade Océane. It would connect from Lines A and B via the 'Gares', which also connects the train and bus stations.

== Rolling stock ==
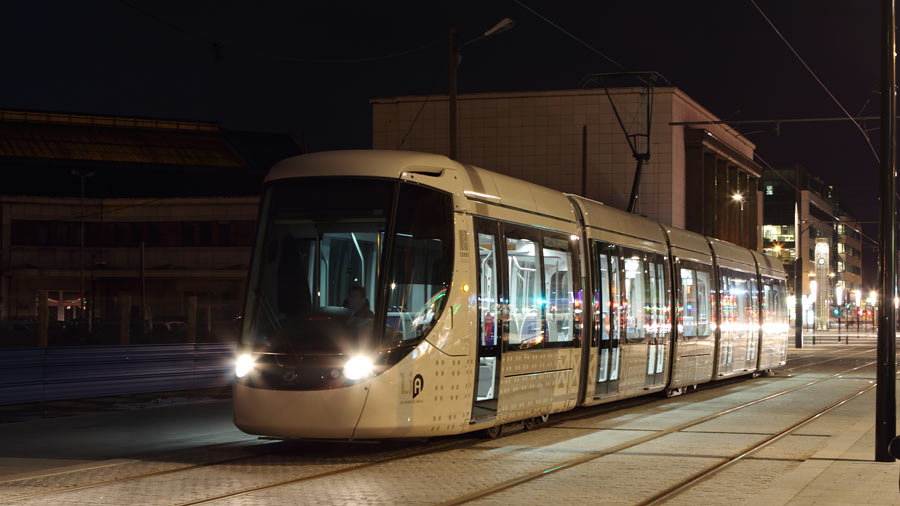
Rame Citadis in front of the train station

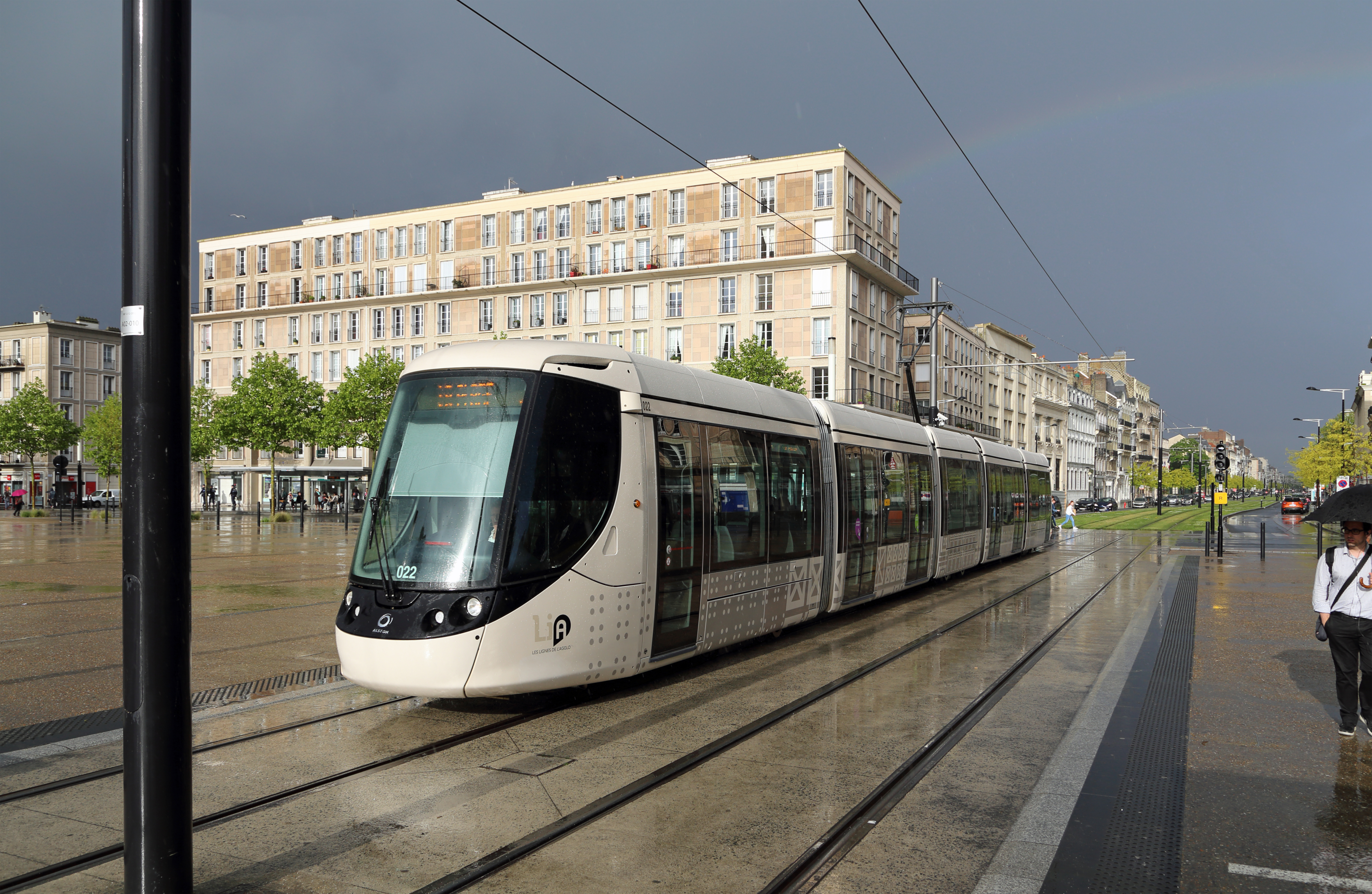
Citadis 302 tram car at the Place de l'Hôtel-de-Ville

The rolling stock comprises 22 Alstom Citatdis 302 tram cars. The deal was announced in July 2007 and was worth more than €54 million. The first tram car arrived at the maintenance centre in February 2012, ten months before the official opening.

== Fares ==
LiA offers a variety of tickets and passes, depending on the length and frequency of the journey. The tickets can be bought at ticket machines which are located at every tram stop. In addition, the tickets are valid to use on the entire bus network in the Le Havre metropolitan area. A ticket that is bought on a bus, via the bus driver, is an additional method of buying a ticket that is valid for use on the tramway network. When boarding the tram, the ticket must be validated.

=== Single trip and day tickets ===
A 1-hour ticket (titre 1 heure) is the cheapest ticket available. The ticket is valid for any and all journeys up to 1 hour. Multiple tickets, each lasting 1 hour, can be bought in tens (10 titres 1 heure). Alternatively, a day ticket (titre journée) can be bought and can be used indefinitely for the entire day from the first time it is validated.

=== Weekly, monthly and annual passes ===
Weekly, monthly or annual subscriptions are also available. Discounts are available for children, students, other young people and employees.

== Traffic ==
In 2014, there were 643,669 travellers on the entire Le Havre public transport network. For the tramway, this represented an increase of 20%.

== See also ==
- Trams in France
- List of town tramway systems in France
- Eu–Mers-les-Bains / Le Tréport tramway
