= Valleuse =

French geological feature

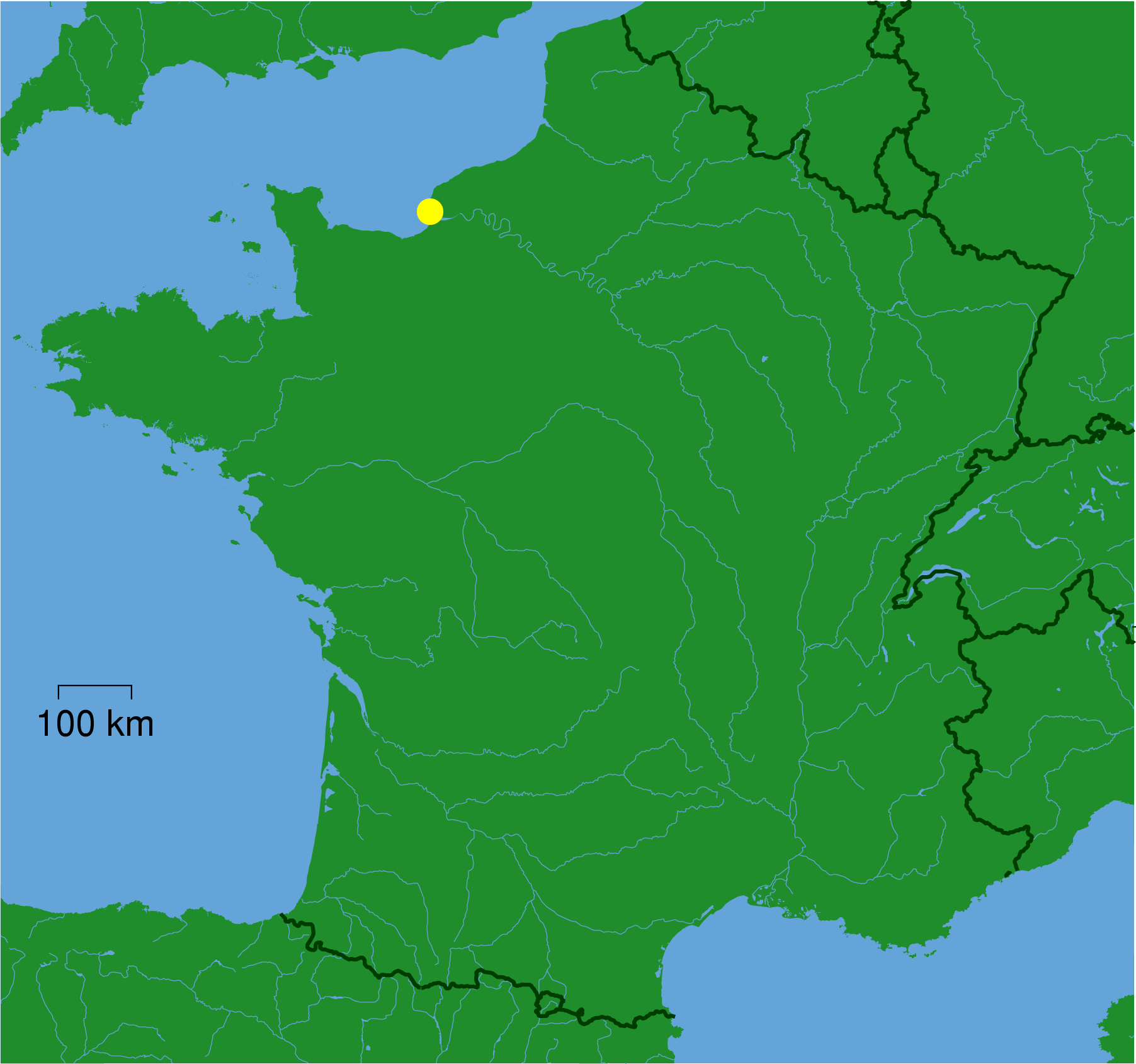
Location within France

In the Pays de Caux, Normandy, France a valleuse is a depression in the land surface of the plateau which permits access to the sea; it is sometimes translated into English as a "cliff hallow." On the rest of this coast, that access is prevented by the height of the chalk cliffs.

There are three (major) sorts:

- living valleuse (valleuse vive): a natural depression as at Fécamp, Yport and Étretat.
- dead valleuse (valleuse morte): to obtain the final access to the beach it is necessary to set up a stairway.
- perched valleuse (valleuse perchée): a simple depression in the plateau surface which do not descend far enough to permit access to the beach. Elsewhere, it might be called a hanging valley though it is formed, not by a glacier but by maritime erosion.

There are also three types by stratigraphy:

1. Simple,
2. Resistant pedestal, and
3. Complex.

== Origins ==
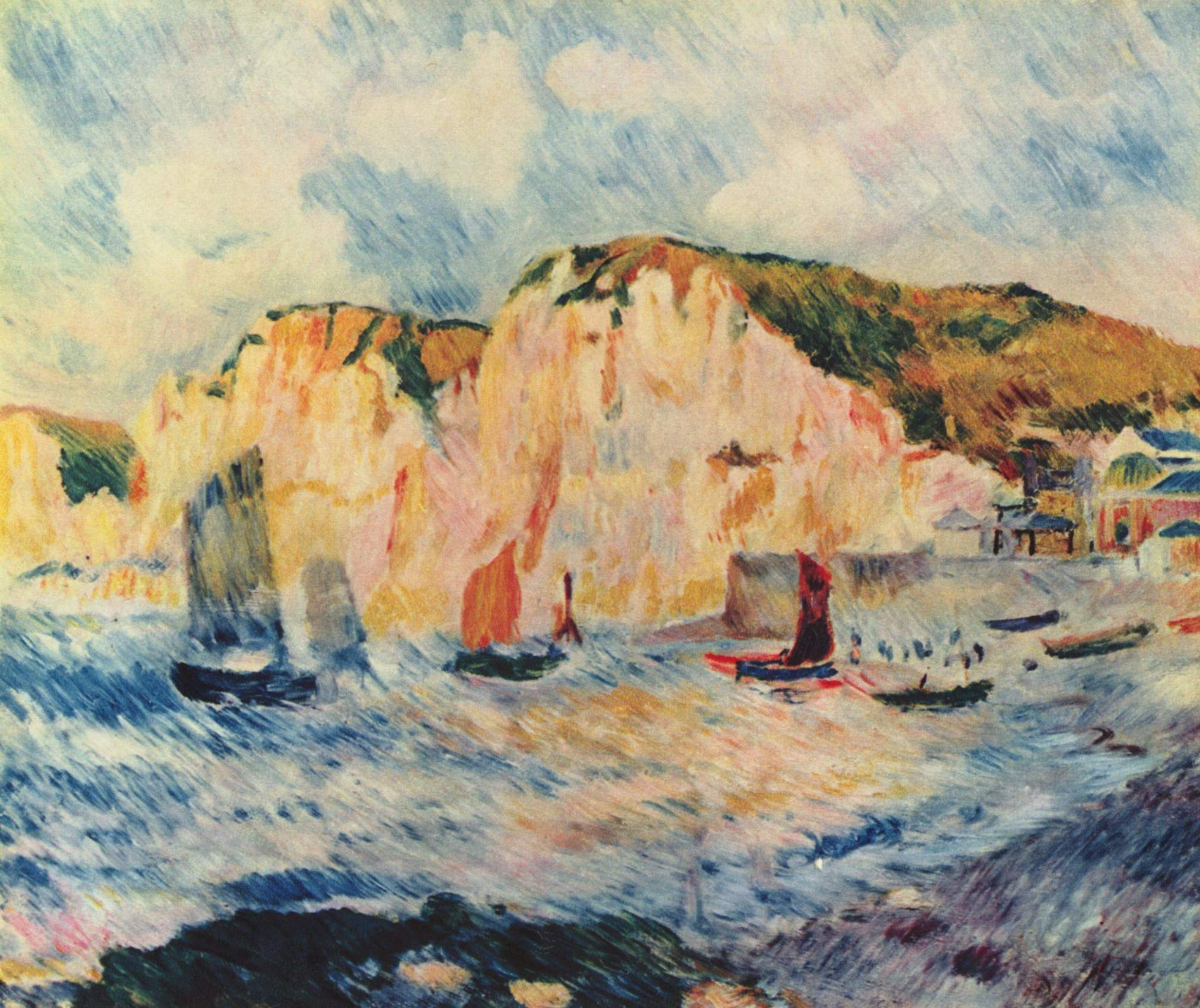
Pierre-Auguste Renoir, Mer et bateaux, 1883, Metropolitan Museum of Art, New York. Note the one living and two perched Valleuses.

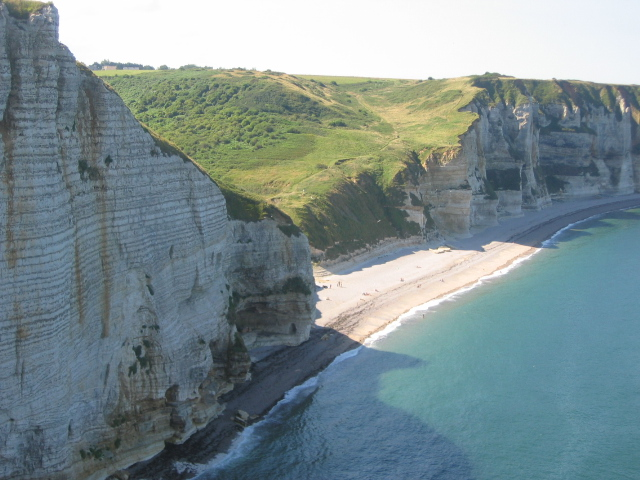
Valleuse du Tilleul, near Étretat.

The word is peculiar to the Pays de Caux but the feature is not, though it shows itself particularly well there. The valleys developed while the water table was much higher in the chalk than it now is so that a stream flowed in each of these truncated valleys. It is likely that most of the formation of the valleys in the plateau occurred during cold periods.

This region was never covered by an ice cap but it has been only about 230 kilometres from one. In those circumstances, the conditions will have been tundra, sometimes verging on periglacial. When the frozen ground thawed in the spring, the surface soil was very wet because the melted snow and ground water could not sink into the permafrost. Any appreciable slope on the surface will have induced slumping and erosion but we have a plateau so the slopes were not originally great.

During the glacial periods, the sea level was low enough to have emptied the English Channel to the north of the Pays de Caux. The truncated valleys in the chalk, represent the headwaters of streams flowing down to what is now the bottom of the sea. During the interglacials the sea eroded the coast and steepened the slope down which they flowed but they will have required ever wetter conditions to keep the water table in the chalk sufficiently high to make the streams flow. In the end, the sea cut the cliff back quicker than the streams cut the valleys downward.
