= Laguna (publisher) =

Serbian book publishing company

- Status: active
- Founded: April 1998.
- Founder: Dejan Papić
- Country of origin: Serbia
- Headquarters location: Beograd
- Key people: Mina Kebin; Ivan Dabetić; Aleksandar Petrović; Srđan Krstić; Dejan Mihajlović; Ivana Misirlić; Zoran Penevski (children's book editor); Irena Markić (children's book editor)
- Nonfiction topics: Fiction, essays, history, non-fiction, popular science...
- No. of employees: 90
- Official website: laguna.rs

Laguna Publishing was founded in 1998 in Belgrade and is one of the biggest publishing houses in Serbia with almost 400 publications a year. Since it was established, Laguna has published over 4,500 titles.

== History ==
In early 1998, Dejan Papić, who was a computer programmer at the time, translated Terry Pratchett's The Colour of Magic, so that his wife could read it in their native language. However, when he tried to acquire the rights for the title, he learned he couldn't do so as an individual and that he needed the help of a publishing house instead. Soon after that, in April 1998, Mr. Papić founded his own publishing house, Laguna. During its initial years, the publishing company faced a bombing, a social crisis and lack of funds, so it progressed at a slow pace. Only one title was published in the first year, two the following and four the year after that. In the year 2000, Laguna began publishing titles by other authors popular worldwide. The list of publications grew year after year, only to reach 350 published titles a year, thus becoming one of the most productive publishing companies in Europe.

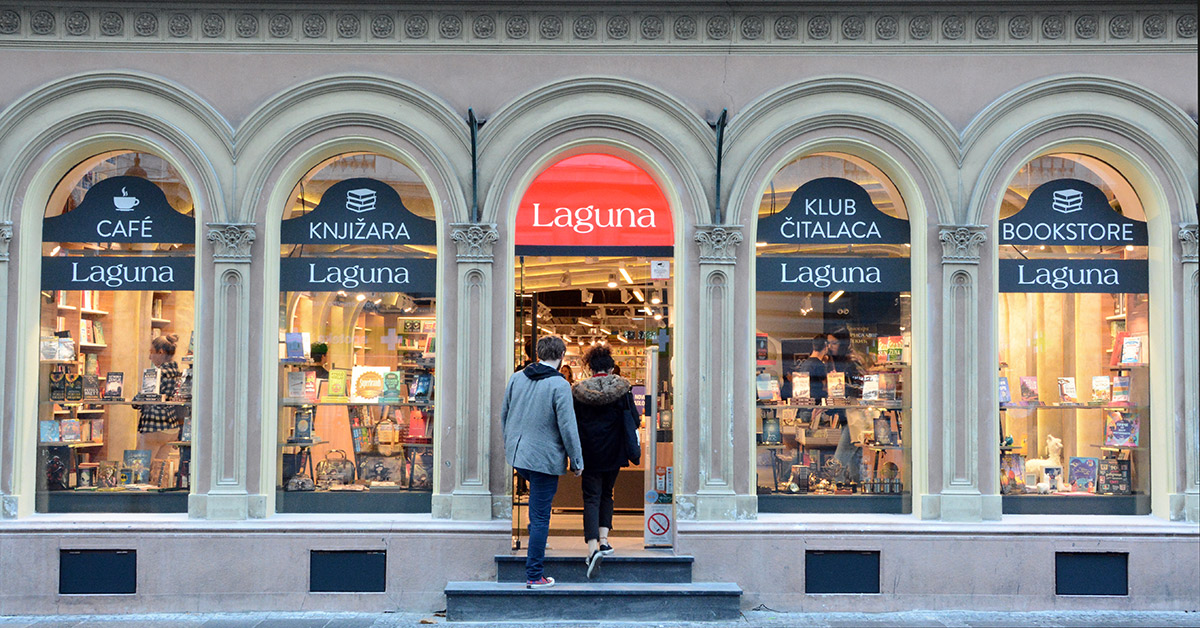
Readers' club "Borislav Pekić" (Belgrade)

== Authors and publications ==
Laguna's first editions were titles by one of the most popular British authors, Terry Pratchett. Today, some of this publisher's foreign language titles include the names of classic authors (Shakespeare, Goethe, Gogol, Chekhov, Kafka, Proust, Musil) and numerous contemporary writers with works mostly from English, Spanish, German, French and Russian speaking territories such as: Nobel winners Mario Vargas Llosa, Herta Muller, José Saramago, Gunter Grass, Toni Morrison, Czeslaw Milosz, Mo Yan, Svetlana Alexievich, George Eliot, Max Frisch, Mark Aldanov, Sylvia Plath, Agatha Christie, Henry Miller, Hans Fallada, John Cheever, Bret Easton Ellis, Amin Maalouf, Ana María Matute, Tony Parsons, Roberto Bolaño, Margaret Atwood, Martin Walser, Bill Bryson, Khaled Hosseini, Victor Pelevin, Lucinda Riley and many others.

Laguna has also published a great number of Serbian classics and works by contemporary authors and the list includes names such as Vuk Karadžić, Stevan Sremac, Borisav Stanković, Branislav Nušić, Ivo Andrić, Miloš Crnjanski, Slobodan Selenić, Borislav Pekić, Svetlana Velmar-Janković, Dobrica Ćosić, Miroslav Antić, Đorđe Lebović, Živojin Pavlović, Dušan Radović, Dragoslav Mihailović, Dušan Kovacević, Ljubivoje Ršumović, Filip David, Dragan Velikić, Radoslav Petković, Svetislav Basara, Goran Petrović, Vladan Matijević, Jovica Aćin, Goran Gocić, Ljubica Arsić, Vule Žurić, Ivana Dimić, Vladimir Kecmanović, Vladimir Arsenijević, Radmila Lazić, Nikola Malović, Ivan Ivanji, Igor Marojević, Mirjana Novaković, Uroš Petrović, Dejan Stojiljković, Slobodan Vladušić, Marko Vidojković, Vladimir Tabašević, Viktor Lazić and others.

Apart from titles from all fiction genres by foreign and Serbian authors, Laguna publishes short story collections, essays, autobiographies, travel books, children's books, picture books, dictionaries, encyclopedias, memoirs of distinguished historical and musical figures, cookbooks, titles about popular science, philosophy, psychology, mythology, and art.

== Business ==
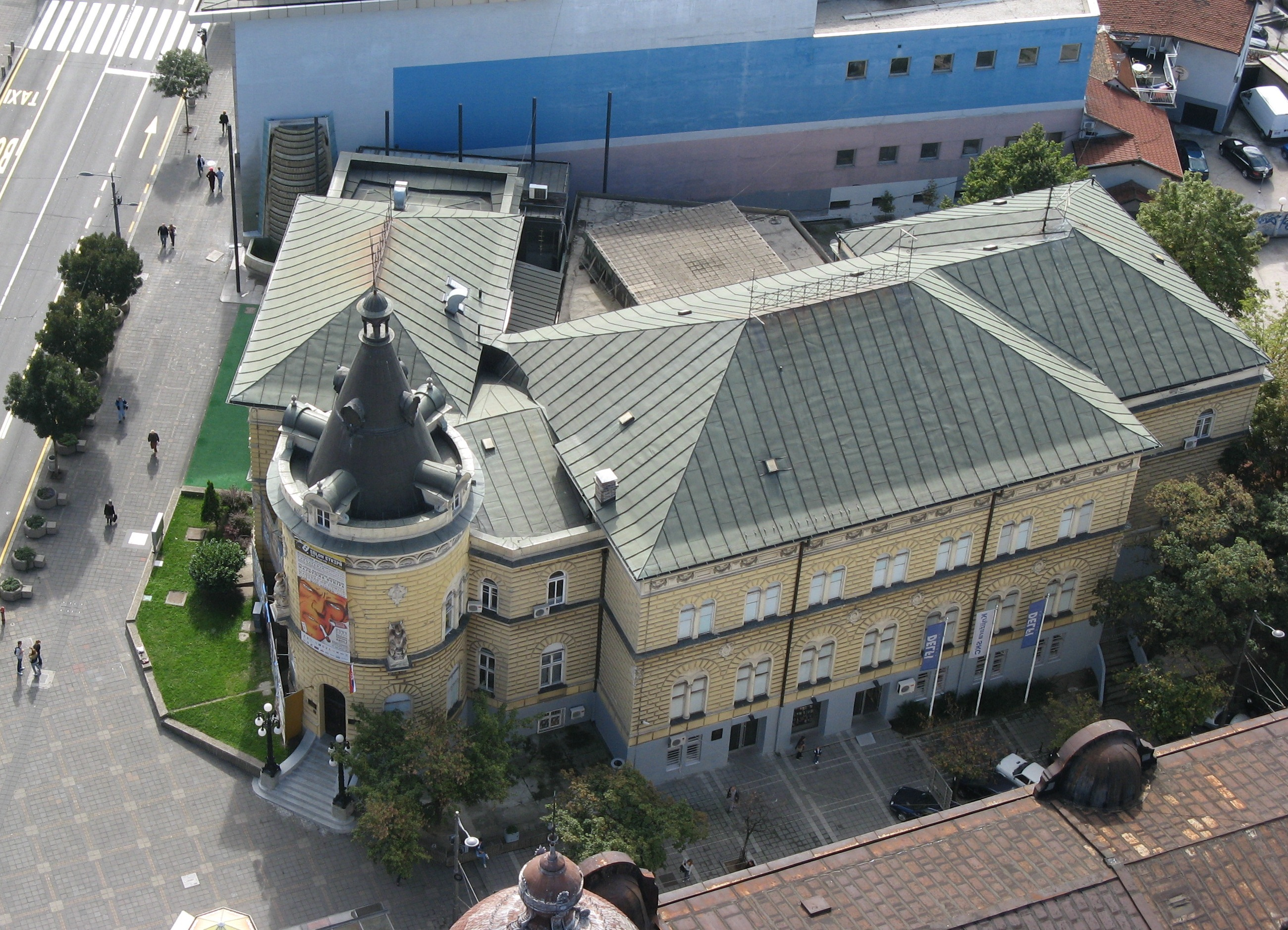
The Student Cultural center building in Belgrade, site of the biggest store in the Delfi bookstore chain

The first bookstore was opened in Belgrade in 2009 in Makedonska street and another was opened the same year in number 48, Kralja Milana street, in the building of the Student Cultural Centre (SKC). Shortly after this, a sister company Delfi and a bookstore chain were founded, using Laguna's ten-year experience in publishing and modeled after the best and most popular international bookstore chains. Today, Delfi bookstores has a total of 43 stores.

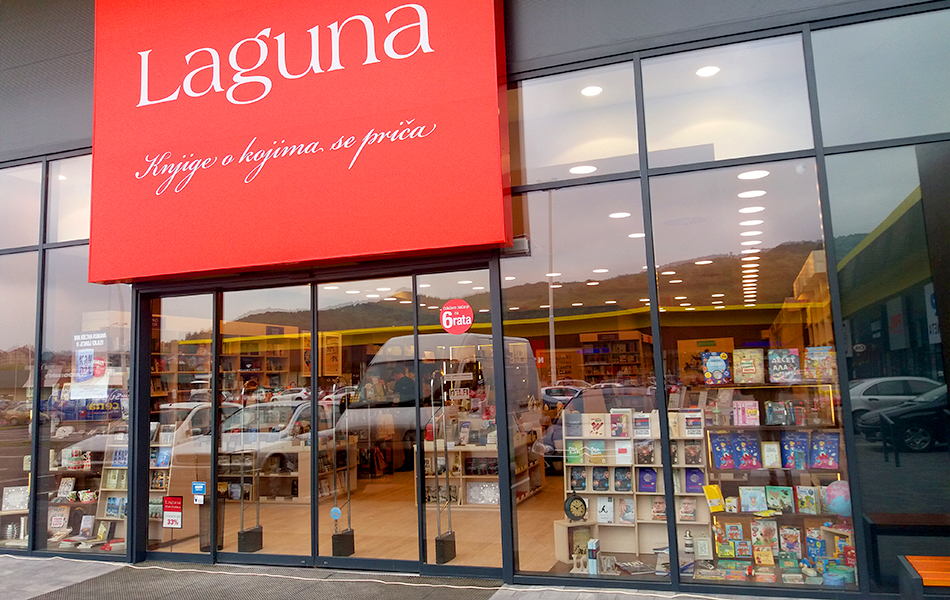
Readers' club in Niš

Laguna does not cover only the Serbian market, but has an active presence in Montenegro, where there are four readers' clubs, as well as in Bosnia and Herzegovina, where Laguna has eight readers' clubs. In its gradual expansion over the years, Laguna began opening readers' clubs in cities all over Serbia and today there are over 600 000 members in 60 clubs in 29 cities in Serbia (Belgrade, Lazarevac, Smederevo, Novi Sad, Novi Pazar Niš, Kragujevac, Zrenjanin, Gornji Milanovac, Jagodina, Kraljevo, Leskovac, Pančevo, Požarevac, Lebane, Sremska Mitrovica, Subotica, Valjevo, Vršac, Zaječar, Čačak, Šabac, Kruševac and Užice) and the region (Bijeljina, Banja Luka, Sarajevo, Tuzla, Nikšić, Podgorica).

Twice a year, in June and December, Laguna hosts Book Night, a popular event during which there is a big discount not only for Laguna's titles but for books from other publishers as well. The first Book Night was organized in 2009 and this event promoting the love of books and reading has been organized every year across Serbia. By popularity and the number of visitors, it is second only to the Belgrade Book Fair. Apart from this one, Laguna organizes many other events to engage their existing members and attract new ones. Some of them include Let's exchange gifts, when every person to donate blood gets a book as a present, Autograph for Safety, during which all collected funds are used to equip the sensory room in Dušan Dugalić, a school for children with special needs; Bring Libraries to Life Again has enabled the collection of over 15,000 books to help libraries destroyed in the floods of 2014. Laguna has also hosted numerous book donations for schools and other institutions and their libraries, as well as for women in safe houses; together with Coca-Cola Laguna has organized book donations for orphaned children and joined forces with the bank Eurobank and the Ana and Vlade Divac Foundation to open libraries in 27 daycare centers across Serbia.

With the desire to bring the literary world to their readers, Laguna regularly organizes literary evenings in all major Serbian cities, in collaboration with many Serbian authors and has been host to numerous foreign authors as well. The list of popular writers that have visited Serbia at Laguna's invitation are Mario Vargas Llosa, Tony Parsons, Tracy Chevalier, Tariq Ali, Amitav Ghosh, William Paul Young, Lucinda Riley, Javier Sierra, Mo Hayder, Pierre Lemaitre, Heleen Van Royen, Giulio Leoni, Luca di Fulvio, Luc Besson, Juan Gómez Jurado, Guy Gavriel Kay, Nataša Dragnić and many others. Norwegian thriller writer Jo Nesbo has also been Laguna's guest, and American fantasy author Peter V. Brett was Laguna's special guest at the 2018 Belgrade book fair.

== Awards ==
During the 20 years of its existence, Laguna and their authors, translators and associates have won numerous prestigious awards and recognitions. Many authors have been awarded several literary and translation awards for the titles they published with Laguna.

The novel "Kuca secanja i zaborava" (The House of Memory and Oblivion) by Filip David was awarded the NIN prize in 2014 and the following year in 2015 this prize was given to another title published by Laguna – Islednik (The Investigator) by Dragan Velikić. In 2016 the prize went to Laguna's author Ivana Dimić for her novel Arzamas and in 2018 the author Vladimir Tabašević received this literary recognition for his novel Zabluda Svetog Sebastijana (St. Sebastian's Misaprehension) also published by Laguna.

The "Ivo Andrić Literary Prize" was awarded to Vule Žurić in 2015 for the short story collection Tajna crvenog zamka (The Secret of the Red Castle), Goran Petrović received this prize in early 2019 for his life's work and the prize "Veljkova golubica" the same year. The novel Ravnoteza (Balance) by Svetlana Slapšak won the "Golden Sunflower" prize and the prize was given to Dragan Velikić for Islednik (The Investigator), a novel that received the prize "Kočićevo pero" as well. Dejan Stojiljkovic was awarded the "Miloš Crnjanski" literary prize in 2009 for the novel Konstantinovo raskršće (Constantine's Crossroads), and Laguna's titles Lutajući bokelj (The Wanderer from Boka) by Nikola Malović and Kuca od soli (The House of Salt) by Milomir Petrović both received the "Laza Kostić" prize.

The "Isidora Sekulić" prize was given to Đorđe Milosavljević for Đavo i Mala gospođa (The Devil and the Little Lady) and to Svetislav Basara for the novel Anđeo atentata (The Angel of Assassination), while authors Ljubivoje Ršumović and Nikola Malović were awarded the "Branko Ćopić" prize. Vule Žurić, the author of the first partizan crime novel Nedelja pacova (The Week of the Rats) was the winner of the "Stevan Sremac" prize, also won by Laguna's authors Ljubica Arsić for her novel Rajska vrata (The Heaven's Door) and Krsta Popovski for his novel Ina. Basara's novel The Angel of Assassination won also the award of the Serbian literary society "Biljana Jovanović", while Dragoslav Mihailović won the "Grigorije Božović" prize the same year for his short story Četrdeset i tri godine (Forty three years).

In early 2019, the fortieth prize of the magazine Politikin Zabavnik for young authors was awarded to Stefan Tićmi, author of the novel Ja sam Akiko (I am Akiko), published by Laguna.

Apart from these prizes, Laguna's titles have received, among others, the "Prize of the Andrić Institute" from Andrić City, the Meša Selimović critics' award for the book of the year, the "Desimir Tošić" prize, the prize of Zmaj's Children's Games Festival "Neven", the "Meša Selimović" regional prize and many others.

Laguna's authors are not the only ones to receive literary awards, many translators working for the publisher have received recognition for their works. Ana M. Jovanović received the translation award Ljubiša Rajić for her translation of the Mo Yan’s novel Žabe (Frogs), Ana Kuzmanović Jovanović was awarded the "Radoje Tatić" prize for her translation of José Saramago's novel Sva imena (Todos os nomes), and the prize "Dr Jovan Maksimović" was awarded to Dejan Mihailović for the translation of the novel Samoubistvo (Самоубийство) by Mark Aldanov.

Laguna has also received multiple Golden Hit Liber awards for the most read title and has been awarded the FONKUR award for Publisher of the Year twice. Among other recognitions, the international award for freedom and journalism should be mentioned, as well as the Liplje prize of the Banja Luka book fair for contemporary literature, the journalists' award for the most professional collaboration with the media in 2011, 2012, 2015 and 2018, the prize of the Belgrade City Library for the most read foreign title in 2008, 2009, 2012, 2013, 2014 and 2018 and for publisher of the year, and Laguna has also been voted publisher of the year by journalists' choice multiple times at the Belgrade Book Fair. At the London Book Fair in the spring of 2016 Laguna was shortlisted next to a French and American publishing house for international publisher of the year.

== Mala Laguna (Laguna Junior) ==
Mala Laguna is a branch of Laguna Publishing dedicated to children's books and young adult titles. The first titles were published in 2002 and since then, around 70 titles are published annually under the Mala Laguna brand. The list of publications includes the works of renowned children's and young adult authors such as Miroslav Antić, Gradimir Stojković, Ljubivoje Ršumović, Vlada Stojiljković, Uroš Petrović, Igor Kolarov, Branko Stevanović, Vladislava Vojnović, Gordana Maletić, Robert Takarič, Vesna Ćorović Butrić, Vesna Vidojević Gajović, Zoran Penevski, and others. Mala Laguna titles include many illustrated books as well, which feature the works of some of the most esteemed Serbian illustrators such as Dušan Petričić, Dušan Pavlić, Aleksandar Zolotić, Nemanja Ristić, Tihomir Čelanović, Marica Kicušić, Milica Radenković, Kosta Milovanović, and many others.

Mala Laguna publications have received numerous awards and recognitions:

- The literary prize of the Politikin Zabavnik magazine:
  - Stefan Tićmi for Ja sam Akiko (I am Akiko) in 2018
- The Zmaj's Children’s Games „Rade Obrenović“ prize:
  - Zoran Penevski for his novel Sara i januar za dve devojčice (Sara and a January for two girls) in 2018
  - Uroš Petrović for his novel Deca Bestragije (Children of Bestragija) in 2013
  - Uroš Petrović for his novel Peti leptir (The Fifth Butterfly) in 2007
- The Neven literary prize:
  - Milica Radenković for her illustrations for the children's novel Izmislica by Vesna Ćorović Butrić
  - Uroš Petrović for his novel Karavan čudesa (Caravan of Wonders) in 2016
- Svetislav Paunović, Igor Kolarov and Branko Stevanović in the category best popular science title for children for Urnebesna fizika (Hilarious physics) in 2015.

== Bookmarker ==
Laguna Publishing started its online magazine titled Laguna Bookmarker – Your Reading Universe in 2017. The magazine publishes interesting facts on published titles, synopsis, reviews, examples of the most beautiful bookstores and literary cafés in the world, as well as interviews with Serbian and foreign authors, articles on reading habits, parenting, and child-rearing. The Bookmarker includes both educational videos and texts and the content published exceeds a thousand publications per year.

== Gallery ==
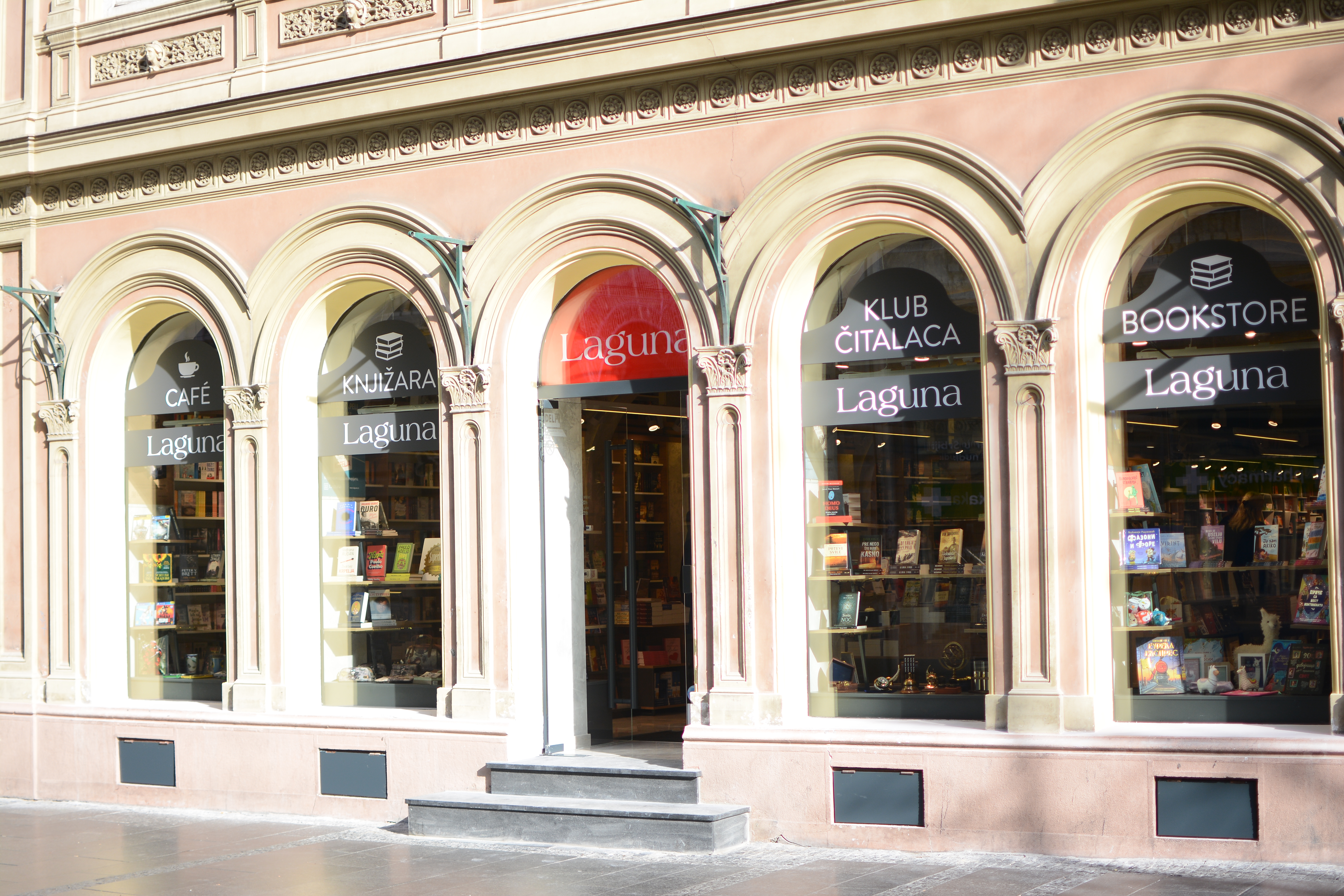
Delfi bookstore Borislav Pekić — outside

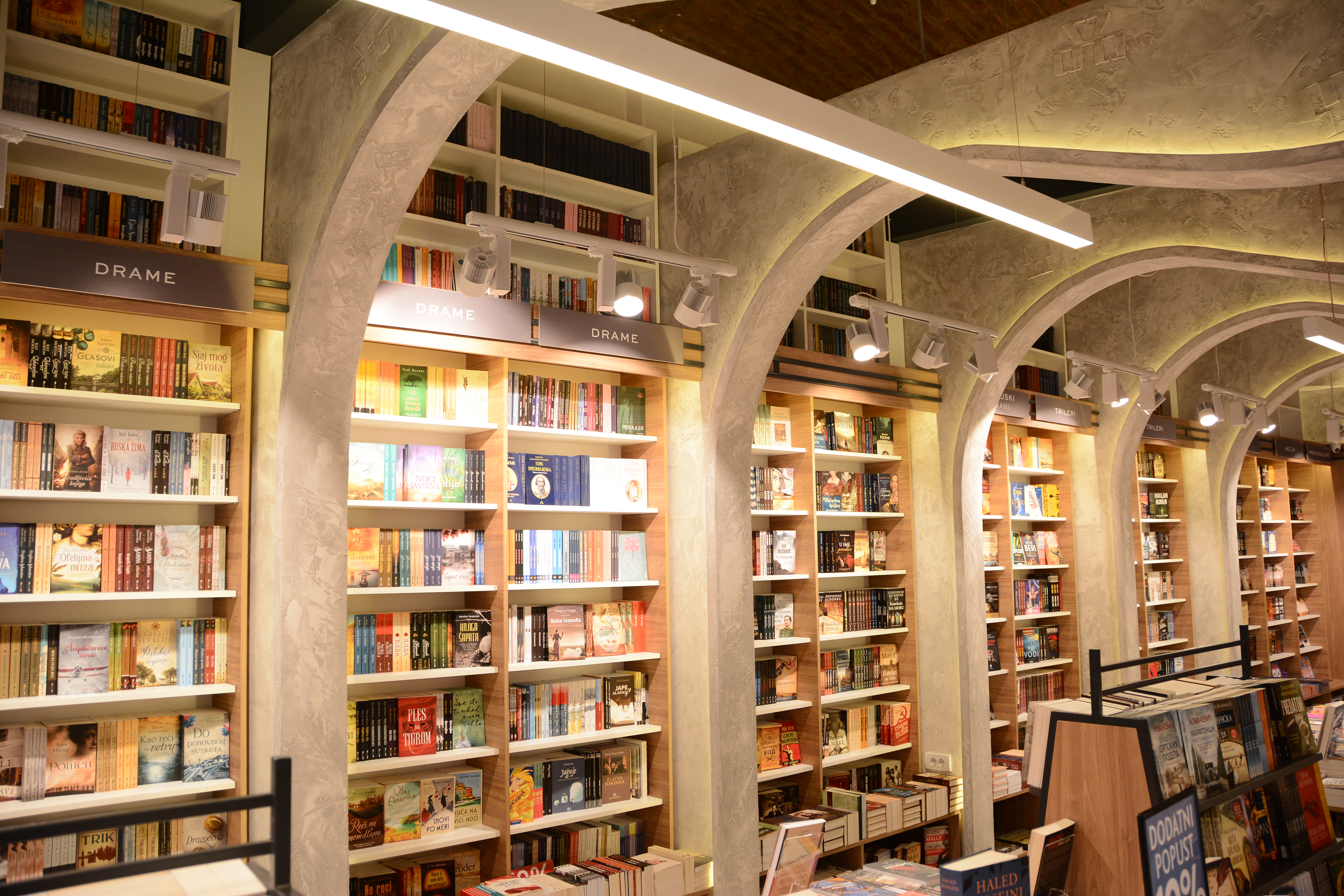
Delfi bookstore Borislav Pekić — inside

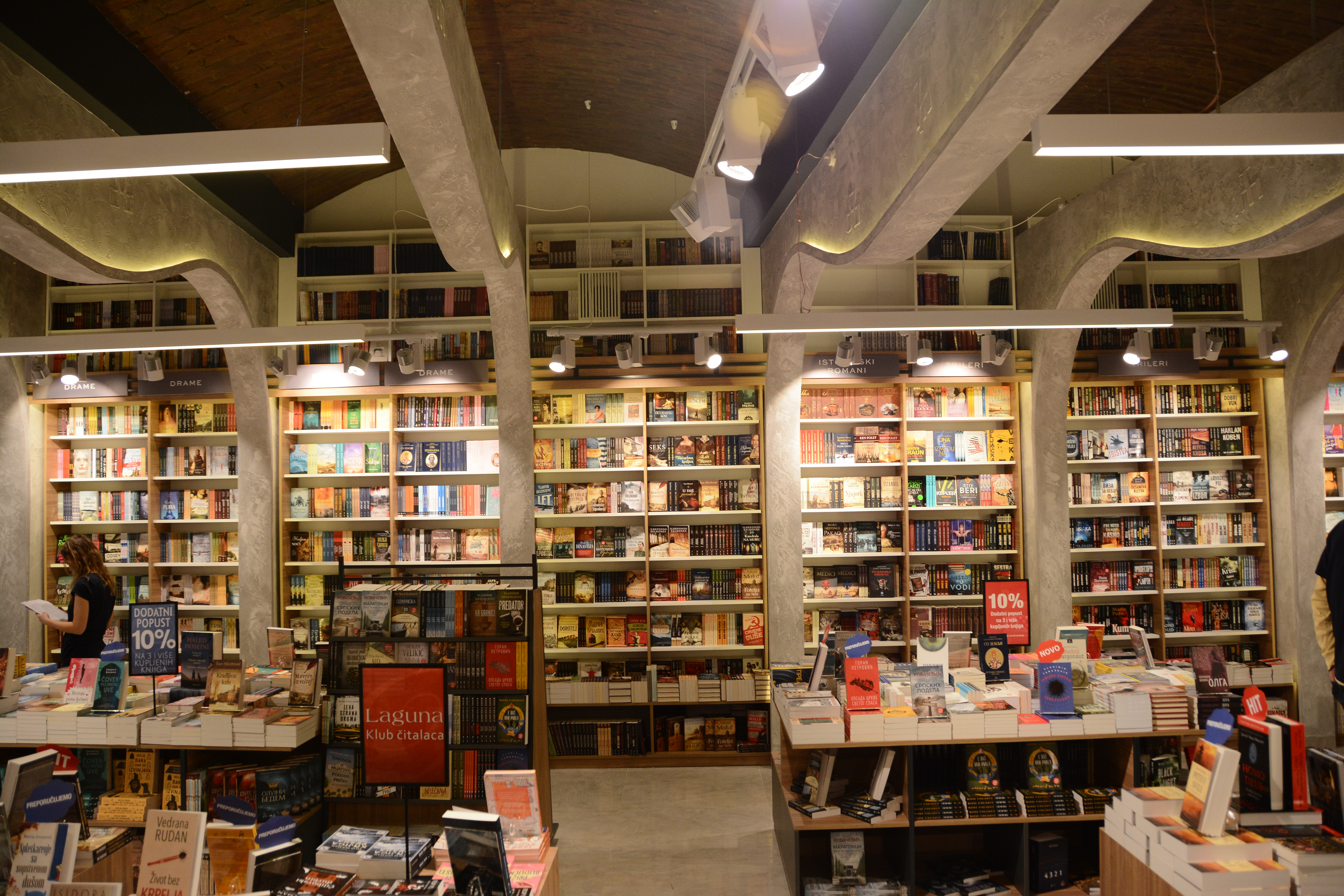
Delfi bookstore Borislav Pekić — inside

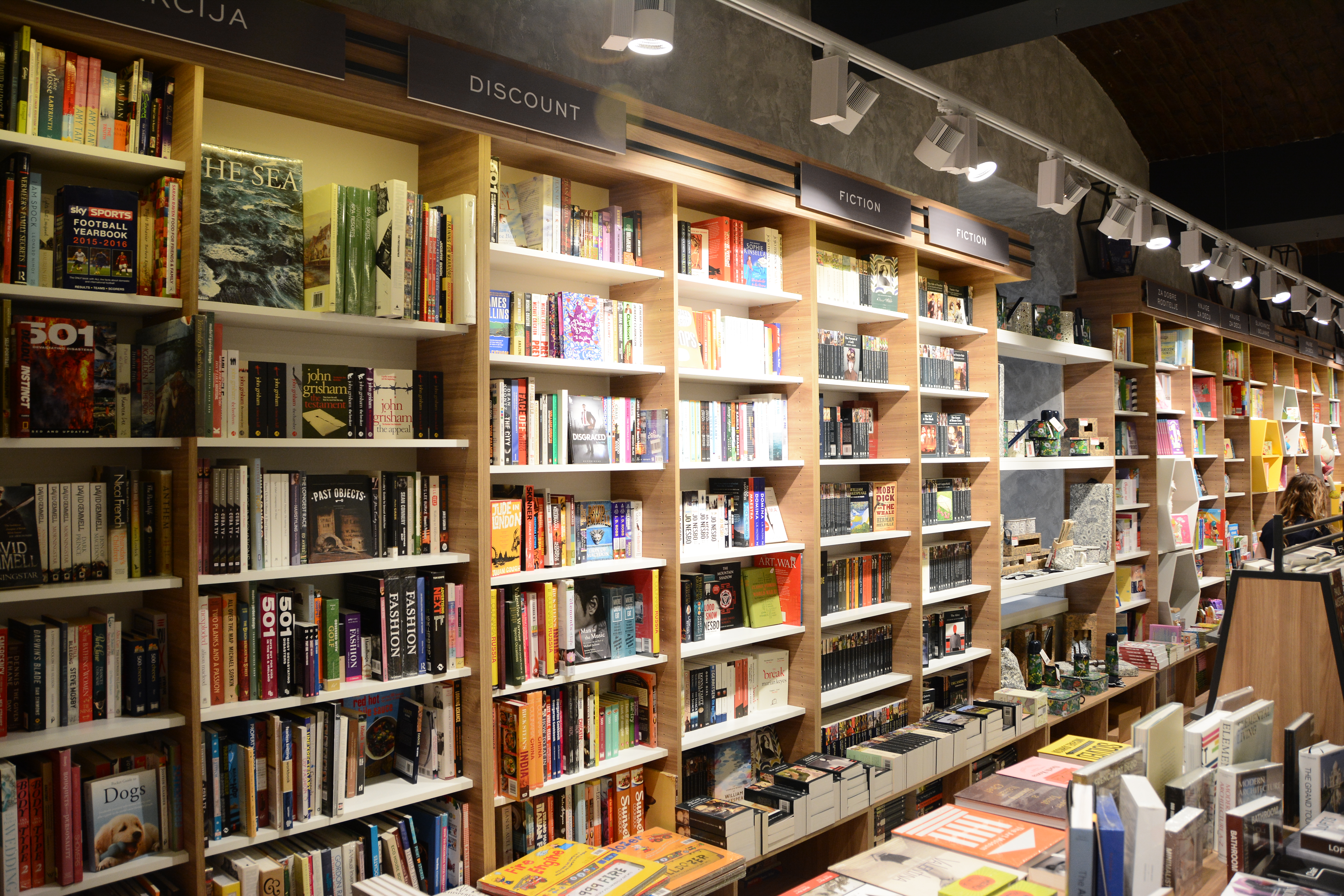
Delfi bookstore Borislav Pekić — inside

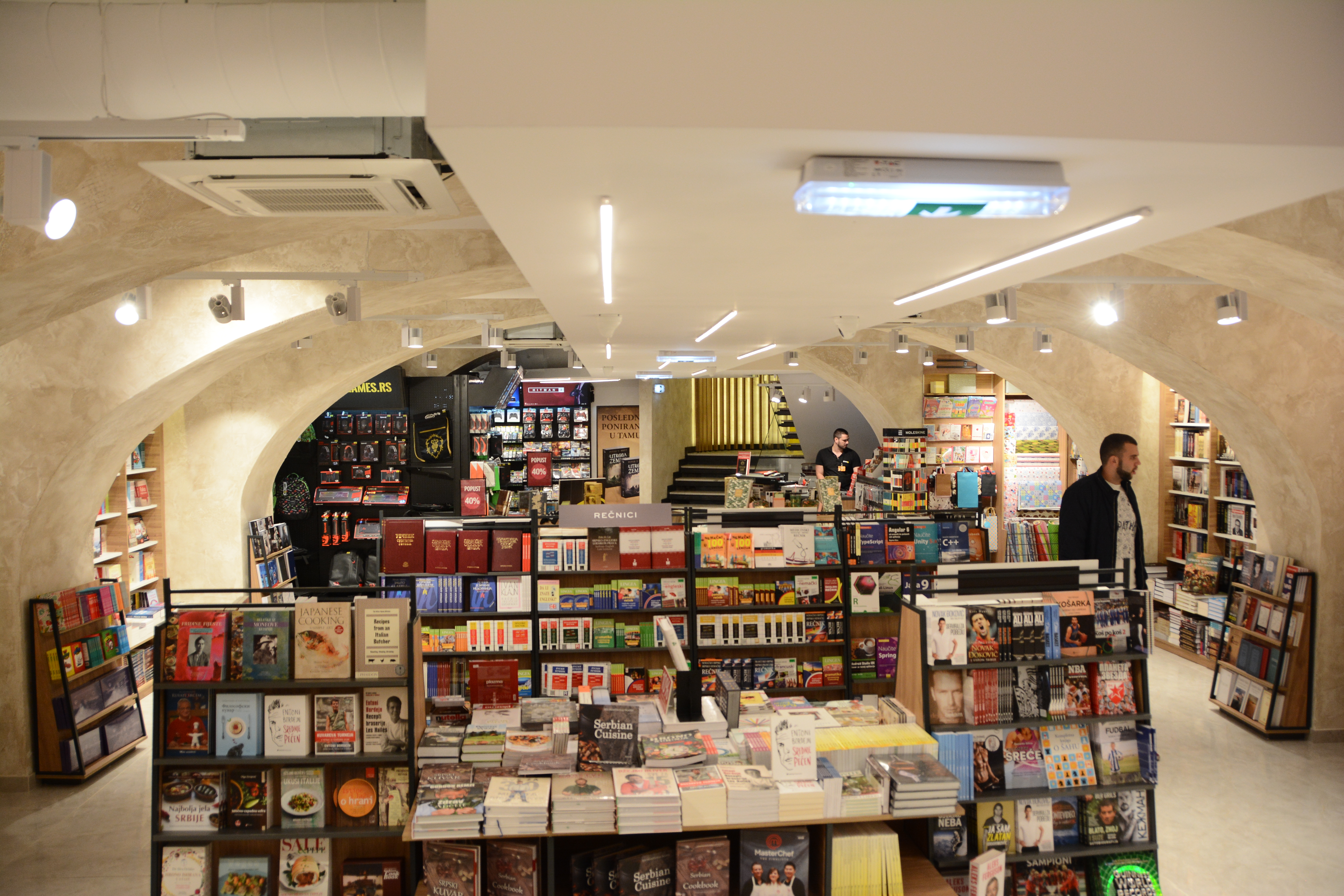
Delfi bookstore Borislav Pekić — inside

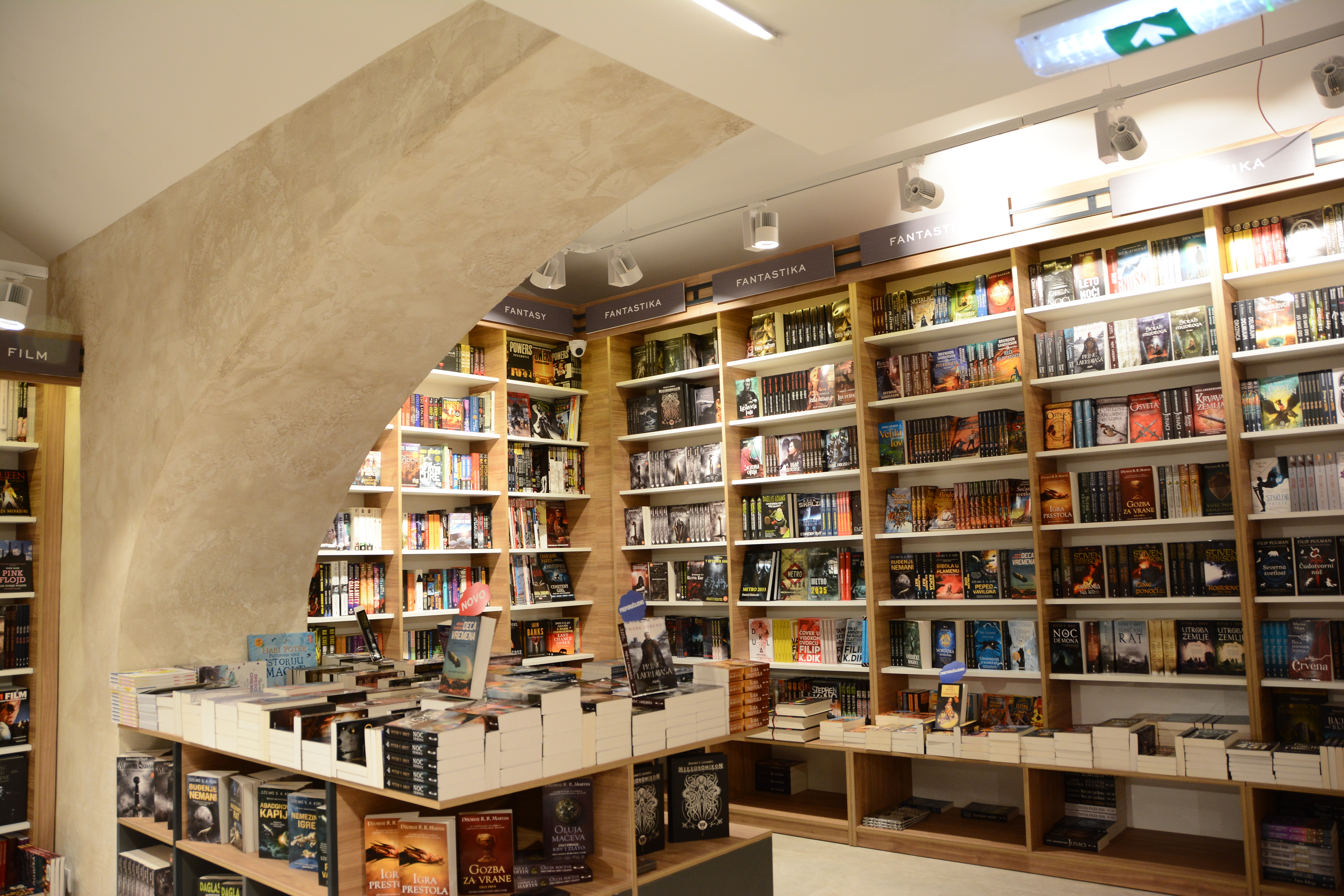
Delfi bookstore Borislav Pekić — inside

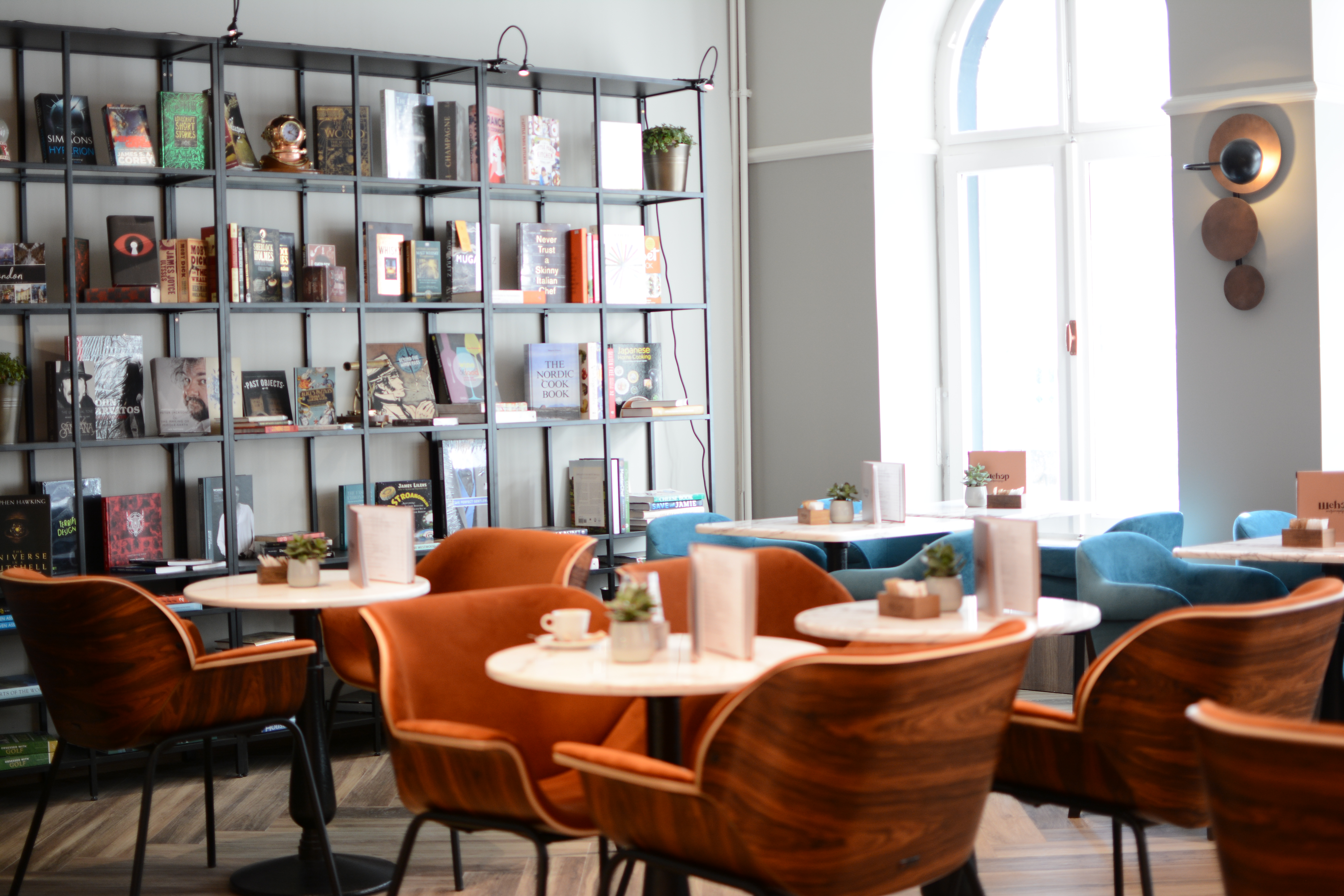
Delfi bookstore Borislav Pekić — inside

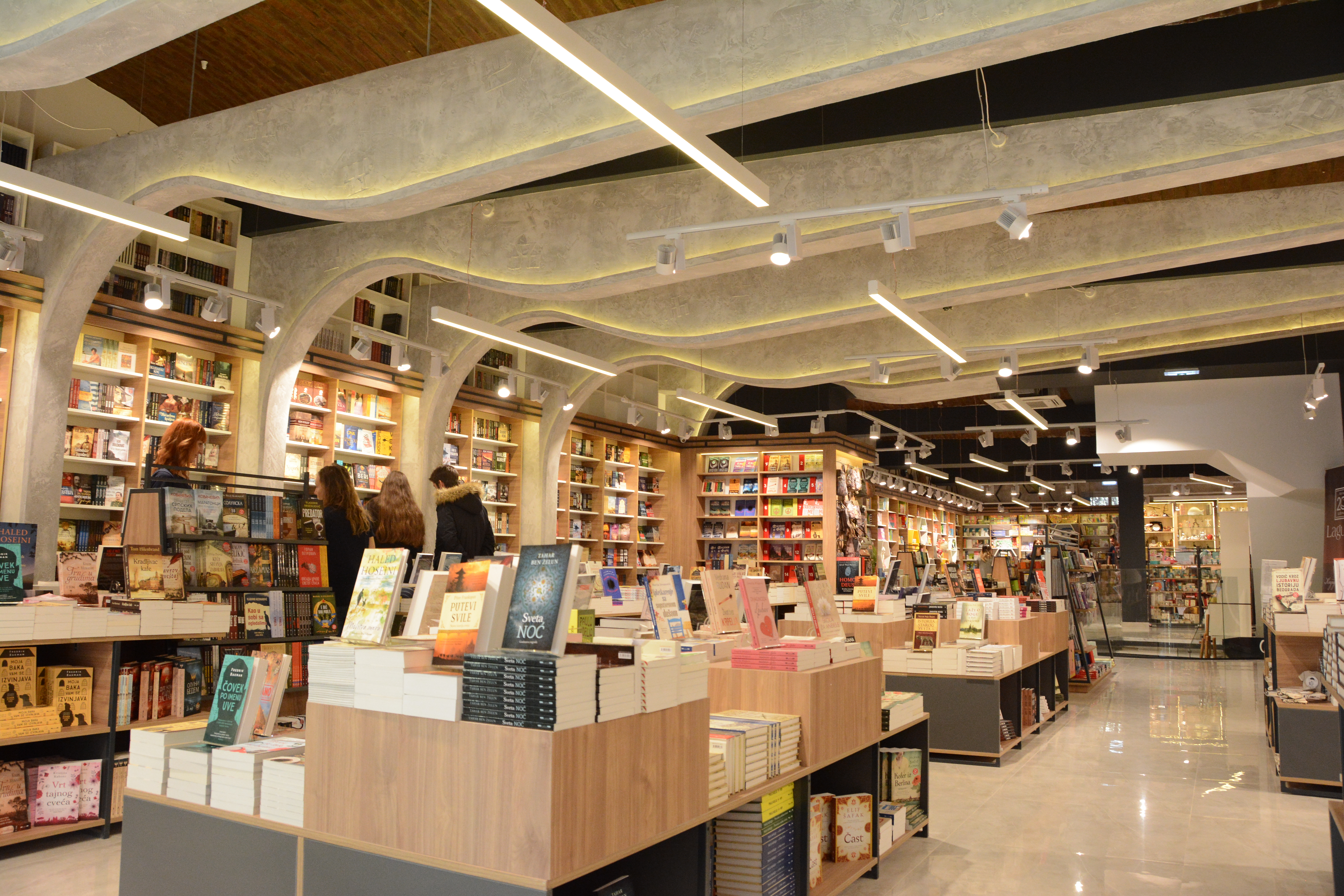
Delfi bookstore Borislav Pekić — inside

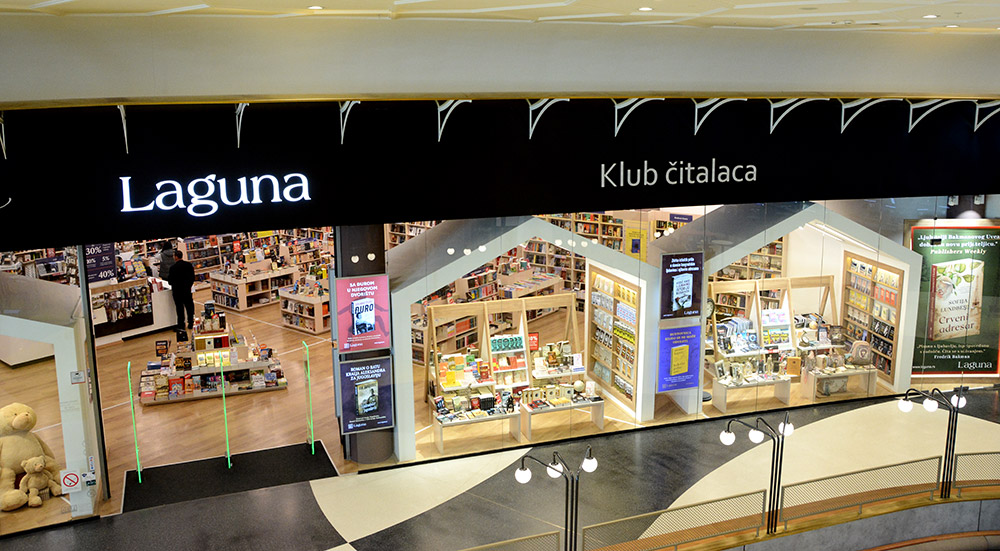
Laguna Readers' club BIG fashion — outside

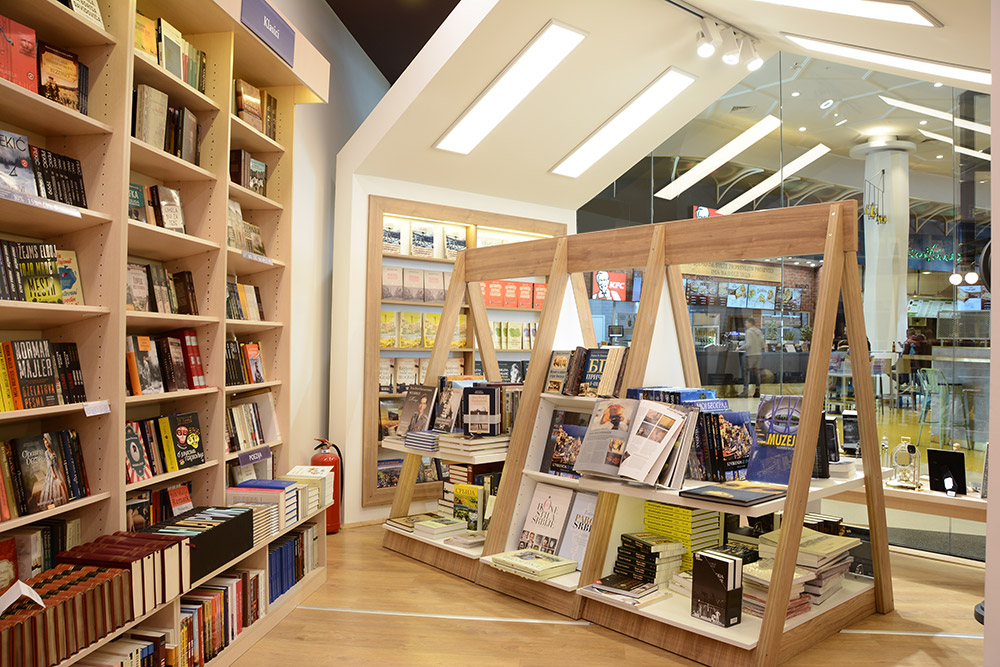
Laguna Readers' club BIG fashion — inside

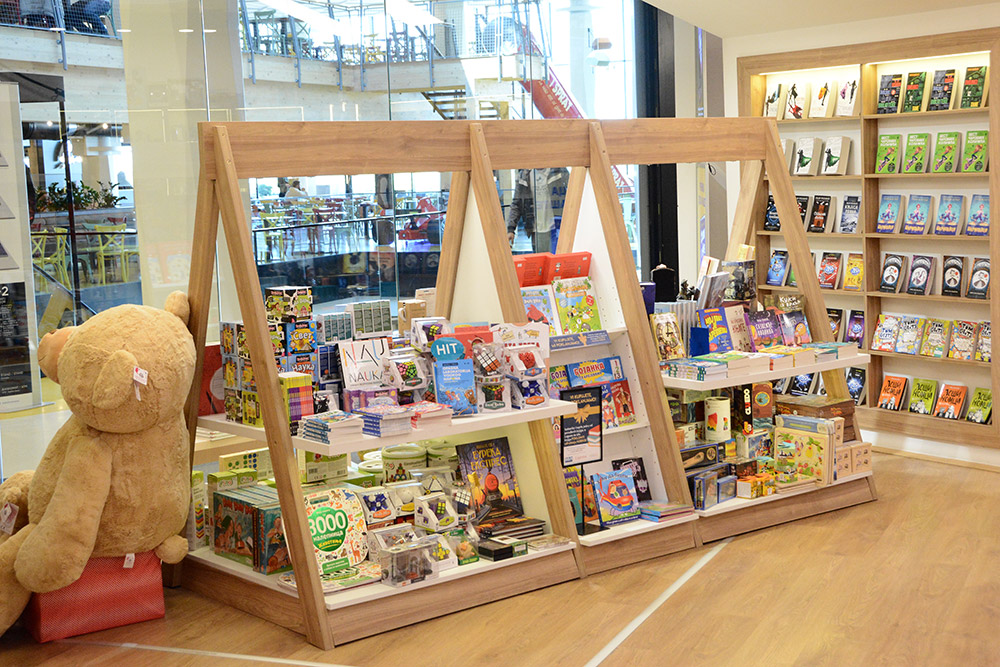
Laguna Readers' club BIG fashion — inside

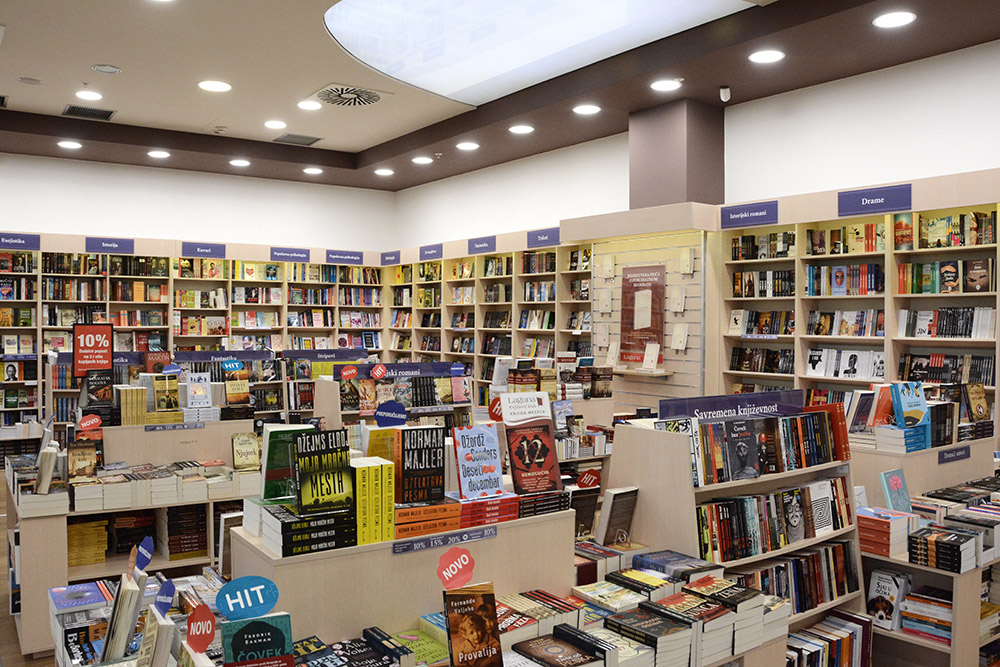
Laguna Readers' club BIG fashion — inside

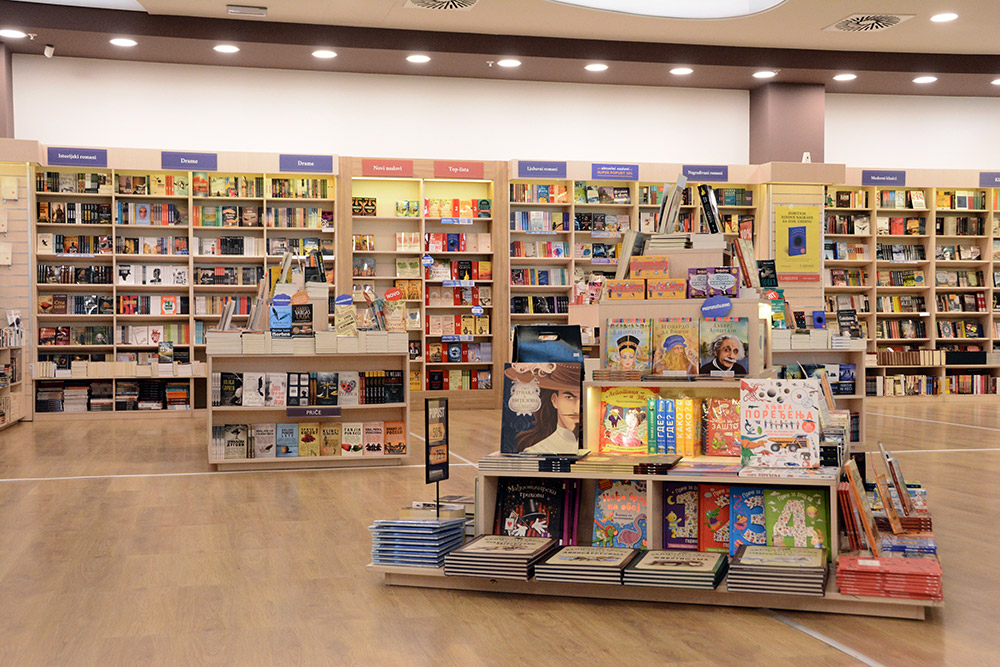
Laguna Readers' club BIG fashion — inside

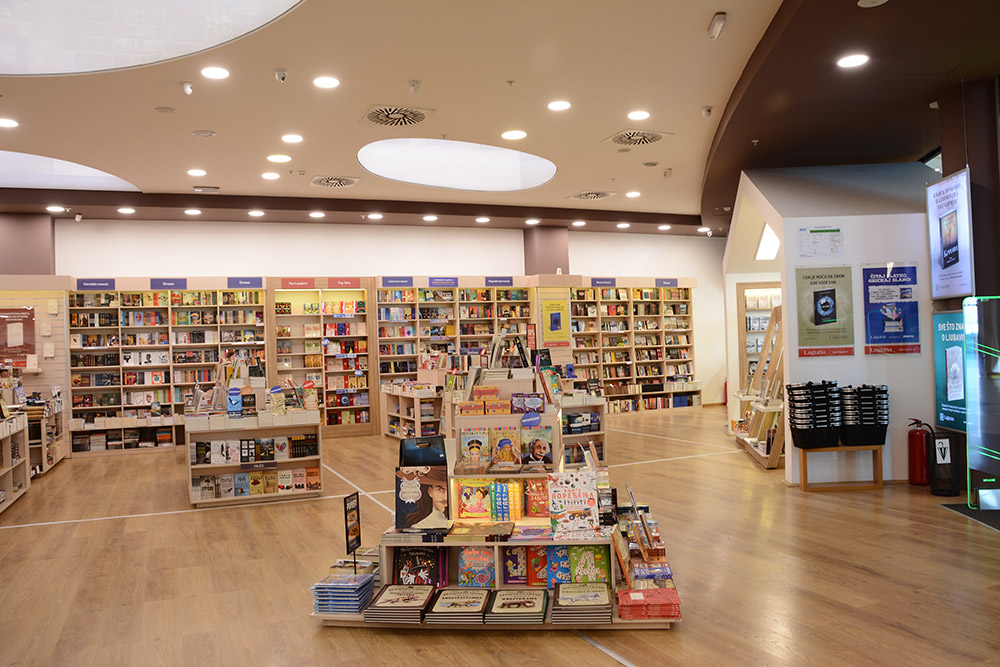
Laguna Readers' club BIG fashion — inside

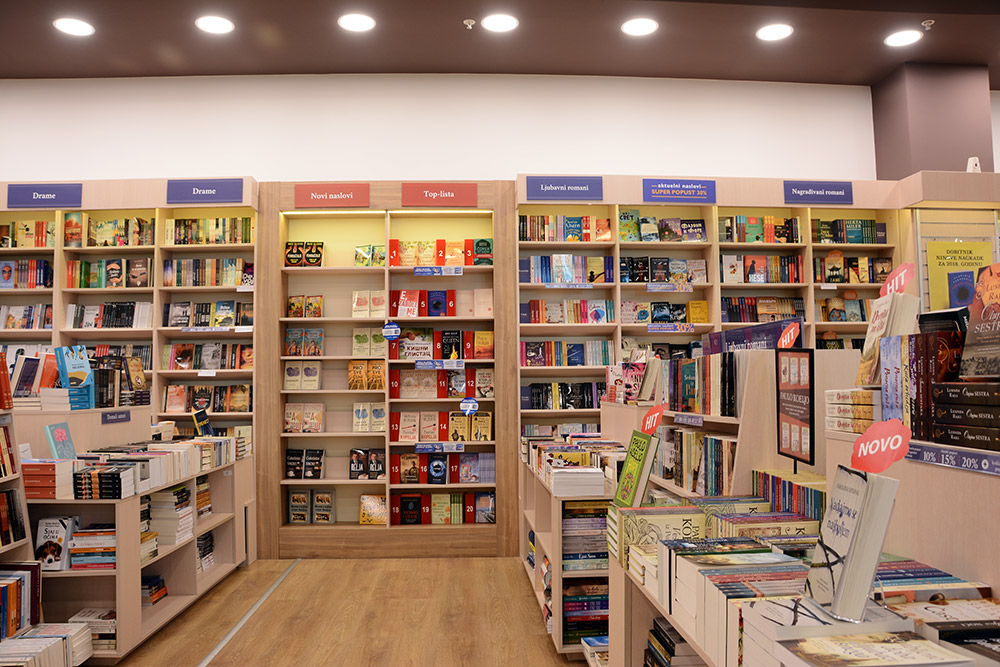
Laguna Readers' club BIG fashion — inside

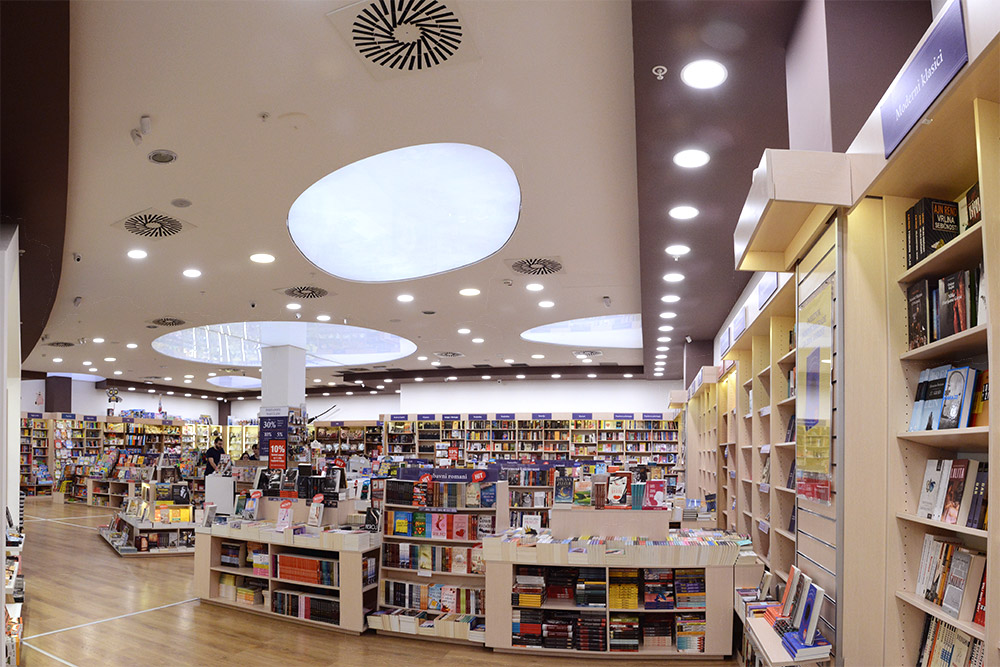
Laguna Readers' club BIG fashion — inside
