= Vladislav Petković Dis =

Serbian impressionist poet (1880–1917)

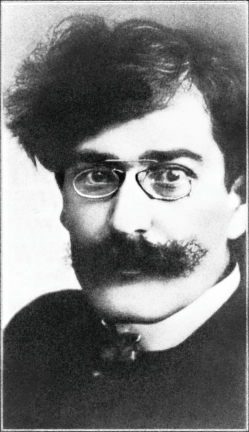
- Born: Vladislav Petković; 10 March 1880; Zablaće, Čačak, Principality of Serbia
- Died: 30 May 1917 (aged 37); Ionian Sea, near Corfu, Kingdom of Greece
- Education: Čačak Gymnasium
- Occupations: Poet, soldier
- Notable work: Utopljene duše Mi čekamo cara Naši dani Cvetovi slave

Vladislav Petković Dis (Serbian Cyrillic: Владислав Петковић Дис; 10 March 1880 – 30 May 1917) was a Serbian impressionist poet. He died in 1917 on a boat on the Ionian Sea after being hit by a torpedo making him also remembered as a war poet.

== Biography ==
Vladislav Petković was born in Zablaće, a village near Čačak, in the Principality of Serbia. He made his way to Čačak, graduating from the Gymnasium and Teacher's College in 1902. He was appointed temporary teacher at Prlita, a village near the town of Zaječar. He did not like teaching, and his small output of poetry brought him little income. In 1903, he moved to Belgrade, and became prominent in the literary life there, when his poems appeared in Idila, a literary magazine. Petković chose his appellation "Dis" as a repetition of the middle syllable of his first name (Vla-DIS-lav), but also as the name of the Roman god of the underworld. He was a frequent evening visitor to the Belgrade's kafanas in Skadarlija and elsewhere where he would drink and compose new verses at the same time.

He obtained an appointment as a customs official with the municipal government, giving him a good income and leisure time to write. He was named co-editor, with Sima Pandurović, of Literary Week (Književna nedelja). Both Petković-Dis and Pandurović were considered the enfants terribles of their literary world (both being under the influence of Charles Baudelaire and other French Symbolists, like Šantić, Dučić, Rakić, Ćorović, and even Skerlić before he abandoned the movement). After the demise of the magazine, he married Hristina-Tinka, with whom he had two children, Gordana and Mutimir.

He wrote Spomenik (Monument) in anticipation of World War I:

And it still seems that,
as my soul dreams on,
the monument lives on,
ready for eternity,
reborn into new traditions,
tempering young ambitions
to erect the next monument.

During the outbreak of the First Balkan War he was conscripted by the military as a journalist. He was the war correspondent covering battles of the Serbian Army in the First Balkan War (1912), Second Balkan War (1913), and World War I that followed. In 1915 he joined the Serbian army in their retreat to Corfu. From Corfu, Petković was sent to France to recuperate and write about the entire tragedy.

He stayed in Marseille, Nice and Les Petites Dalles, eager to return to the Balkans. In May 1917, via Rome and Naples, he arrived in Gallipoli, Italy. At 9 pm on May 29, after two days of waiting, he boarded the French passenger steamship Italia destined to Corfu, from where he was supposed to join the Serbian army fighting on the Salonica front. At 5:51 am on May 30, Italia was sunk by torpedo by the Austro-Hungarian Navy U-boat U-4, 46 miles southeast of Santa Maria di Leuca, Italy.

== Poetry ==
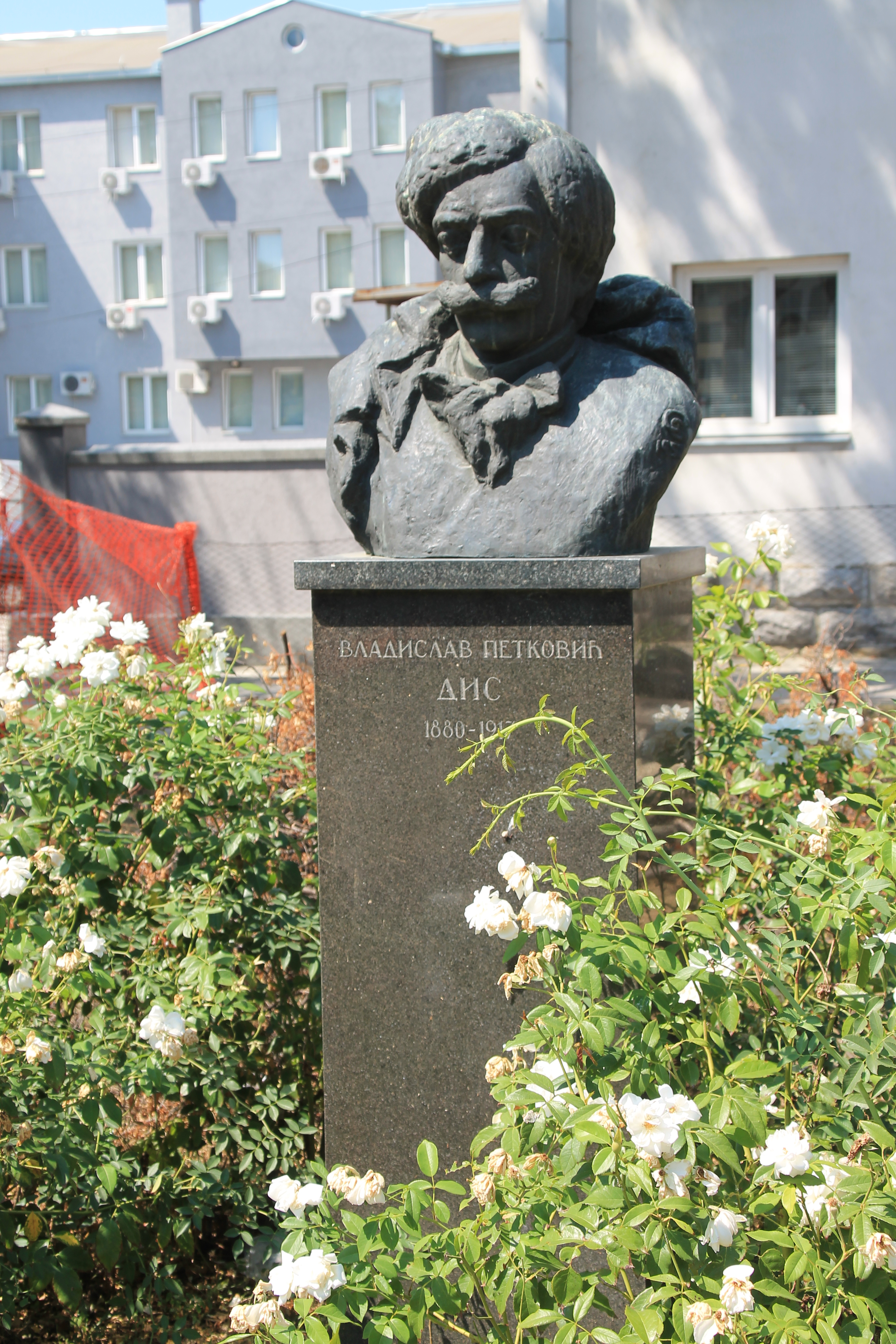
Bust of Dis in Čačak

He introduced irrational and subconscious images into Serbian lyric poetry. Some of his most famous poems are Možda spava (She May Be Sleeping) and Spomenik (Monument).

In Spomenik, Dis dreamed of a monument:

It has a long life,
Today it descends into new legends,
To prepare our descendants for the next monument.

Petković Dis was writing in 1913, just after Serbia wrested Kosovo from the Ottoman Empire and installed an obelisk on the site of the famous medieval battle when Kosovo was severed from Serbia by the Ottomans. Dis's poetry was not well received at the beginning by Jovan Skerlić, one of the most distinguished Serbian literary critics of that time, who did not care for the poems' morbid and sinister tone.

His poem Cvetovi slave (Flowers of Glory) was translated into English by Djuradj Vujcic.

== Dis Poetry Prize ==
The poetry prize bearing his name (Disova nagrada) has been awarded annually since 1965. Recipients include some of the most notable Serbian and Yugoslav poets: Vasko Popa (1965), Desanka Maksimović (1968), Oskar Davičo (1971), Miloš Crnjanski (1973), Izet Sarajlić (1982), Vesna Parun (1986), Ivan V. Lalić (1988), Matija Bećković (1990), Milovan Danojlić (1995), Radmila Lazić (2004), among others.

The prize is awarded during the event Disovo proleće (Dis's Spring), which is regarded as one of the major cultural events in the city of Čačak and surrounding areas.

== Sources ==
- Skerlić, Jovan (1921). Istorija srpske književnosti. Beograd.
- The Anthology of Serbian Literature Project (in Serbian)
