= Lazić =

Lazić (Serbian: Лазић) is a Serbian surname. Notable people with the surname include:

- Boban Lazić (born 1994), Bosnian-Dutch professional footballer
- Bojan Lazić (born 1974), professional Serbian football player
- Borivoj Lazić (1939–2015), Serbian scientist and professor at the Institution of Electrical Engineering at the University of Belgrade
- Branko Lazić (born 1989), Serbian professional basketball player
- Darko Lazić (singer) (born 1991), popular Serbian singer
- Darko Lazić (footballer) (born 1994), Serbian football defender
- Dejan Lazić (born 1977), Croatian pianist and composer, and a naturalised Austrian citizen
- Đorđe Lazić (footballer) (born 1983), Serbian professional footballer
- Đorđe Lazić (water polo) (born 1996), Serbian water polo player
- Igor Lazić (footballer, born 1967) (born 1967), Bosnian former footballer
- Igor Lazić (ice hockey) (born 1992), Croatian ice hockey player
- Jugoslav Lazić (born 1979), Serbian football goalkeeper
- Katarina Lazić (born 1980), former Yugoslavian and Serbian female basketball player
- Milan Lazić (born 1982), Serbian football defender
- Nemanja Lazić (footballer, born April 1990), Serbian football midfielder
- Nemanja Lazić (footballer, born March 1990), Serbian football midfielder
- Predrag Lazić (born 1982), Serbian footballer
- Radivoj Lazić (born 1953), musician, clarinettist, pedagogue, composer, painter and children's writer
- Slađana Pop-Lazić (born 1988), Serbian female handball player
- Uroš Lazić (born 2003), Serbian footballer
- Viktor Lazić (born 1985), one of Serbia's most well known modern travel writers
- Vladimir Lazić (born 1984), Serbian futsal player
- Vlatko Lazić (born 1989), Dutch professional footballer
- Zorica Lazić in Veliki brat 2007, the Serbian, Bosnian and Montenegrin version of Big Brother

== See also ==
- Lazic War or Colchidian War, fought between the East Roman (Byzantine) Empire and the Sassanid Empire
- Lazi (disambiguation)
- Lazica
