= Les Petites Dalles =

Coordinates: 49.821°N 0.528°E

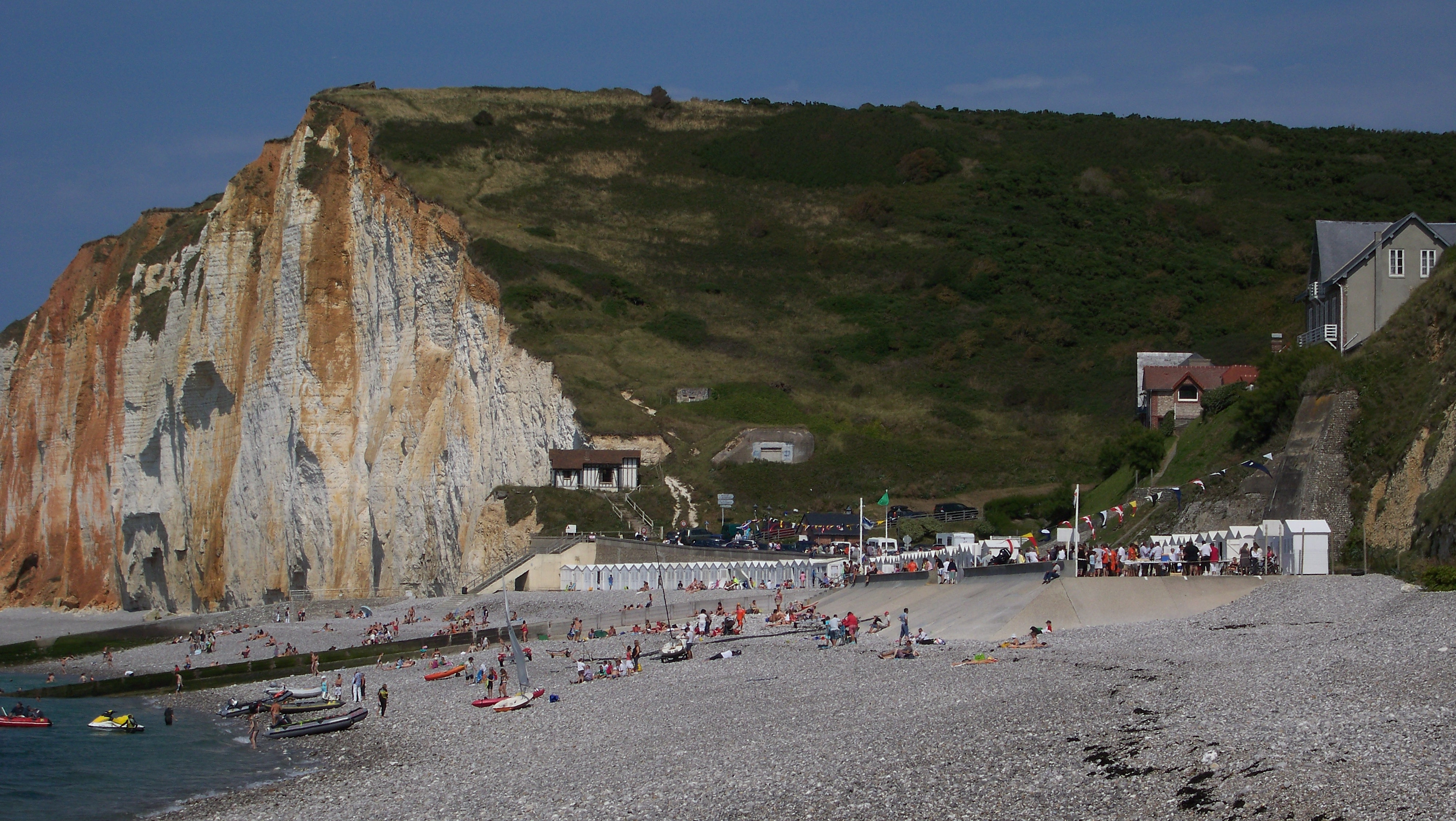
cliff and beach of Petites-Dalles

Les Petites Dalles (English: The Small Slabs) is a hamlet on the English Channel coast in the department of Seine-Maritime, in the Normandy region of France. The hamlet is in the communes of Sassetot-le-Mauconduit and Saint-Martin-aux-Buneaux, Seine-Maritime.

== History ==
In 1865, French politician Henri Wallon, in search for a vacation spot not too far from Paris for his family, discovered Petites-Dalles. In 1868, he started spending his summer holidays here, renting various houses, including the Saillot property (today, Villa Brise-Lames), which he bought in 1876.

During World War I, a Serbian colony took refuge in Petites-Dalles and stayed at the Hôtel des Pavillons and the Villa Kermor. The first Serbian refugees arrived in Grandes-Dalles on 27 January 1916. There were 133 of them. The colony moved from Grandes-Dalles to Petites-Dalles on 23 May 1916. In August 1916, it had 83 people: 23 women and 60 men. These were not wounded or convalescent soldiers, but mainly representatives of liberal professions – lawyers, doctors, engineers – who had fled their invaded country. Among them was Vladislav Petković Dis, a famous Serbian poet. On 26 August 1916, he participated with Ernest Daudet in a concert organized at Petites-Dalles for the benefit of the French and Serbian Red Cross.

=== World War II ===
Around 11:30 am on June 10, 1940, Nazi field marshal Erwin Rommel, at the head of the 7th Panzer Division, reached the Channel at Petites-Dalles.

Merchant navy captain Joseph Pierre Heuzé, resident of Petites-Dalles, participated in the evacuation of Jews towards England during World War II. He was arrested by the Nazis, who could not obtain any information from him in spite of the arrest of his brother Louis Joseph a few months earlier. The small amount of sensible information was encrypted in his missal, that Heuzé had the presence of mind to throw away when arrested. He was interned in Rouen prison, and on 6 April 1944 deported to Mauthausen. He was gassed on September 7 in Hartheim. He was 62. In tribute to his bravery and determination, his name was given to the main street of Petites-Dalles.

== People ==
=== People who have been to or lived in Petites-Dalles ===
- Jules Verne (1828-1905)
- Michel Verne (1861-1925)
- Sissi, empress Élisabeth of Austria (1837-1898)
- Ernest Daudet (1837-1921)
- Alphonse Daudet (1840-1897)
- Gustave Eiffel (1832-1923)
- Jean-Philippe Lauer (1902-2001)
- Georges Perec (1936-1982)
- Jeanloup Sieff (1933-2000)
- Brad Pitt (1963-), for the realisation of a commercial for a Japanese telephone company
- Sarah Bernhardt (1844-1923)
- Henri Poincaré (1854-1912)
- Henri Bellery-Desfontaines (1867-1909)
- Louis Leprince-Ringuet (1901-2000)
- Maryse Mourer, alias Martine Carol (1920-1967)
- Henri Opper de Blowitz (1825-1903)
- Hector Malot (1830-1907)
- Henri-Alexandre Wallon (1812-1904), politician
- Pierre Bérégovoy (1925-1993), politician

=== Painters who have painted Petites-Dalles ===
- Claude Monet (1840-1926)
- Camille Pissarro (1830-1903)
- Eugène Delacroix (1798-1863)
- Eugène Boudin (1824-1898)
- Berthe Morisot (1841-1895)
- Pauline Caspers (1865-1946)

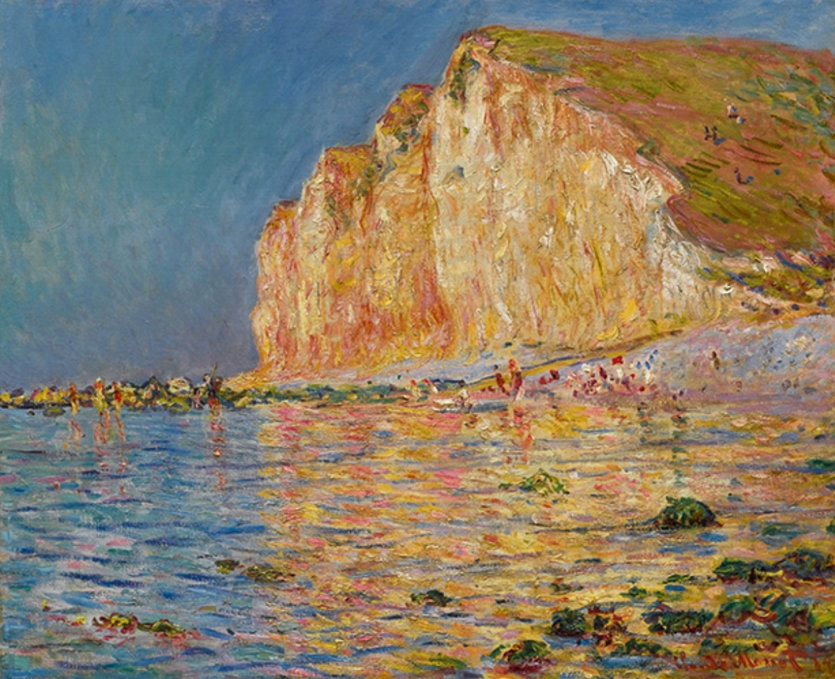
Monet, 1884
