= Borivoj Lazić =

Serbian computer scientist

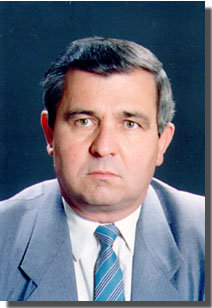

Borivoj G. Lazić (Serbian: Боривој Лазић) (1 August 1939 – 4 April 2015) was a Serbian computer scientist and professor at the Faculty of Electrical Engineering of the University of Belgrade. He is known for his involvement in the development of microprocessor systems and the CER Computer.
