= Belgrade Book Fair =

Book fair held annually in Belgrade, Serbia

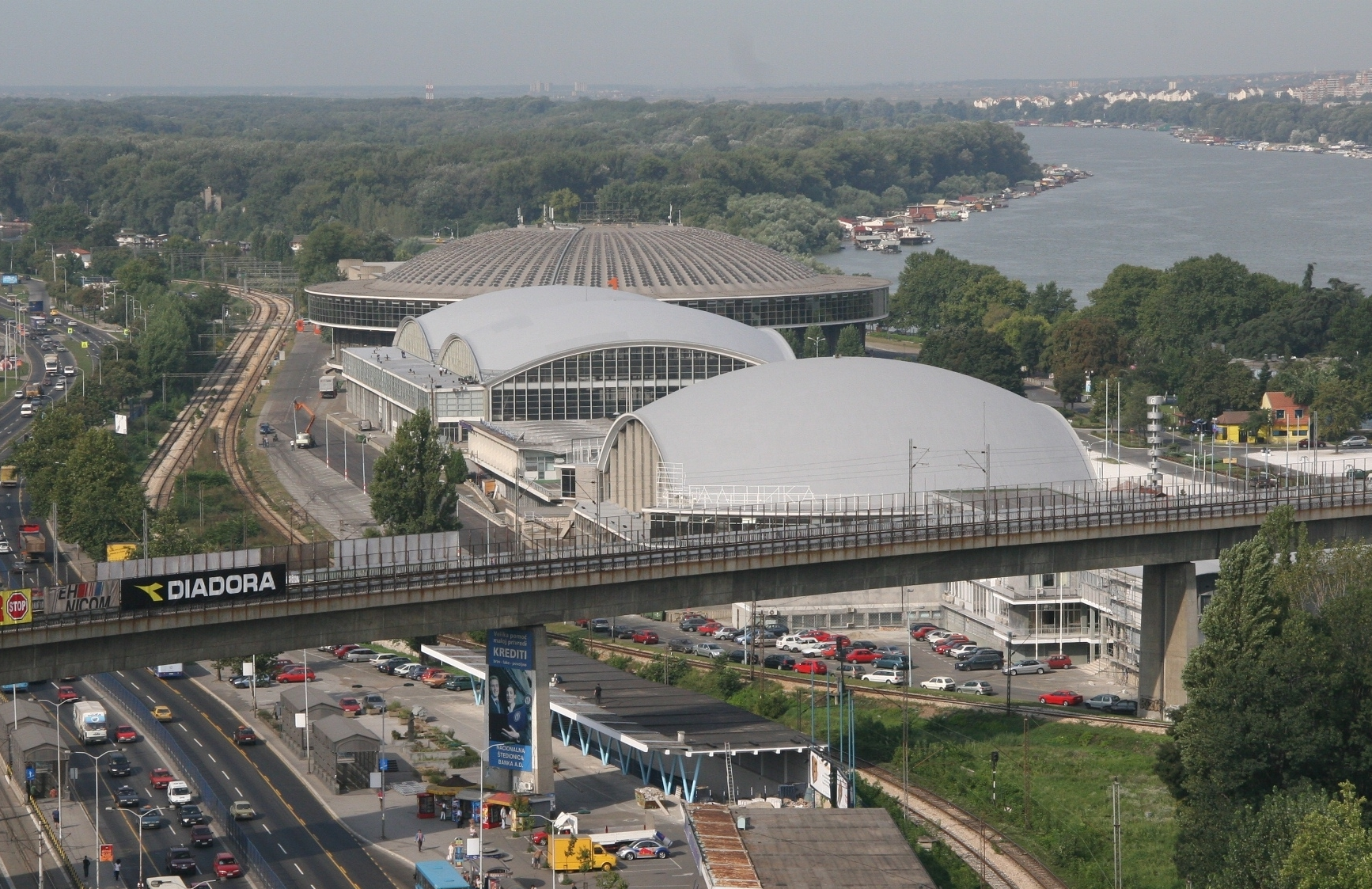
- Exhibition Hall in Belgrade Fairground
- Status: Active
- Genre: Multi-genre
- Frequency: Annually, in mid-October
- Venue: Belgrade Fair grounds
- Location: Belgrade
- Country: Serbia
- Inaugurated: 1957; 69 years ago
- Attendance: 184,532 (2019)
- Website: sajamknjiga.rs

The International Belgrade Book Fair is a book fair held annually in Belgrade, the capital of Serbia. One of the oldest literary events in the region, its basic objective is enabling publishers, authors, booksellers, librarians, book distributors, multimedia companies and other participants to establish contacts, exchange experiences, do business deals and establish other forms of business and cultural cooperation. All publishers from Serbia and the most prominent ones from the region feature at the Fair their annual publishing production.

In addition to the publishing program, an extensive side event one is organized at the Fair, as well: conferences, round table conferences, meetings with authors, public discussion panels and workshops. For the visitors, the Book Fair is an opportunity to find at one place and buy at special prices the books they are interested in, as well as to meet their favorite authors and discover the new ones, attending one of many programs.

The Book Fair is the most visited cultural event in Serbia. In 2019, there were 184,532 visitors at the Fair. Based upon the organizer's data, in 2019, the Fair was followed by 1,300 accredited journalists.

According to a research conducted by the Strategic Marketing among Belgrade citizens in 2010, the Book Fair was proclaimed the greatest brand of Belgrade.

On the occasion of the Anniversary – sixty years since its founding, Belgrade Book Fair is the winner of the award of the Cultural and Educational Community of Belgrade The Golden Link 2015 for the permanent contribution to Belgrade culture.

The Belgrade Book Fair was set up by the City of Belgrade, it is managed by the Book Fair Council and the Executive Organizer is the company Belgrade Fair. The Fair is traditionally held in October, in Belgrade Fair Halls 1, 1A, 2 and 4, at the space of about 30,000 square meters and it lasts for eight days.

In 2026, Belgrade Book Fair will take place from October 23 to 31.

== History ==
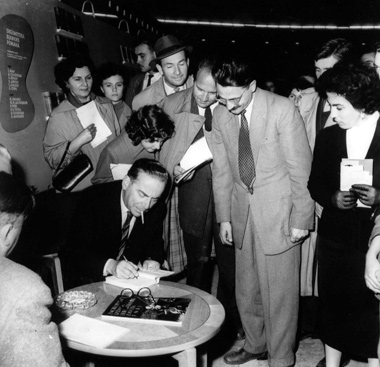
Ivo Andrić signing books at the Book Fair

The first Yugoslav Book Fair was held in 1956, at Zagreb Fair, under the auspices of the President Josip Broz Tito. It was attended by the most important writers of the country, among them also Ivo Andrić and Miroslav Krleža. About 12,000 books of all Yugoslav publishers were displayed there, but also of those from Austria, Czechoslovakia, the Netherlands, UK, France, Italy, China, Hungary, East and West Germany, Poland, Romania, US, Soviet Union and Switzerland.

In the following year, 1957, the Fair was moved to Belgrade, where the construction of a modern fair ground was completed. The books were displayed by about 60 local and 36 international publishers, from 16 countries in Europe, America and Asia. It was agreed that the International Book Fair should include the catalog and last for six days. The Fair was held at the end of October, in Belgrade Fair Hall 3 and on the occasion of the Fair festivity, the Book and the World magazine was initiated, as well. The first Belgrade Book Fair was opened by Mr. Rodoljub Čolaković, the Vice President of the Federal Executive Council at that time.

The International Book Fair in Belgrade gathered annually an increasing number of publishers from the former Yugoslavia and the whole world, so that after the Frankfurt and Warsaw Book Fairs, it became the largest meeting point of the publishing staff from Europe, America, Asia and Africa. The East and West cultures met in Belgrade and still meet there.

== Prizes ==
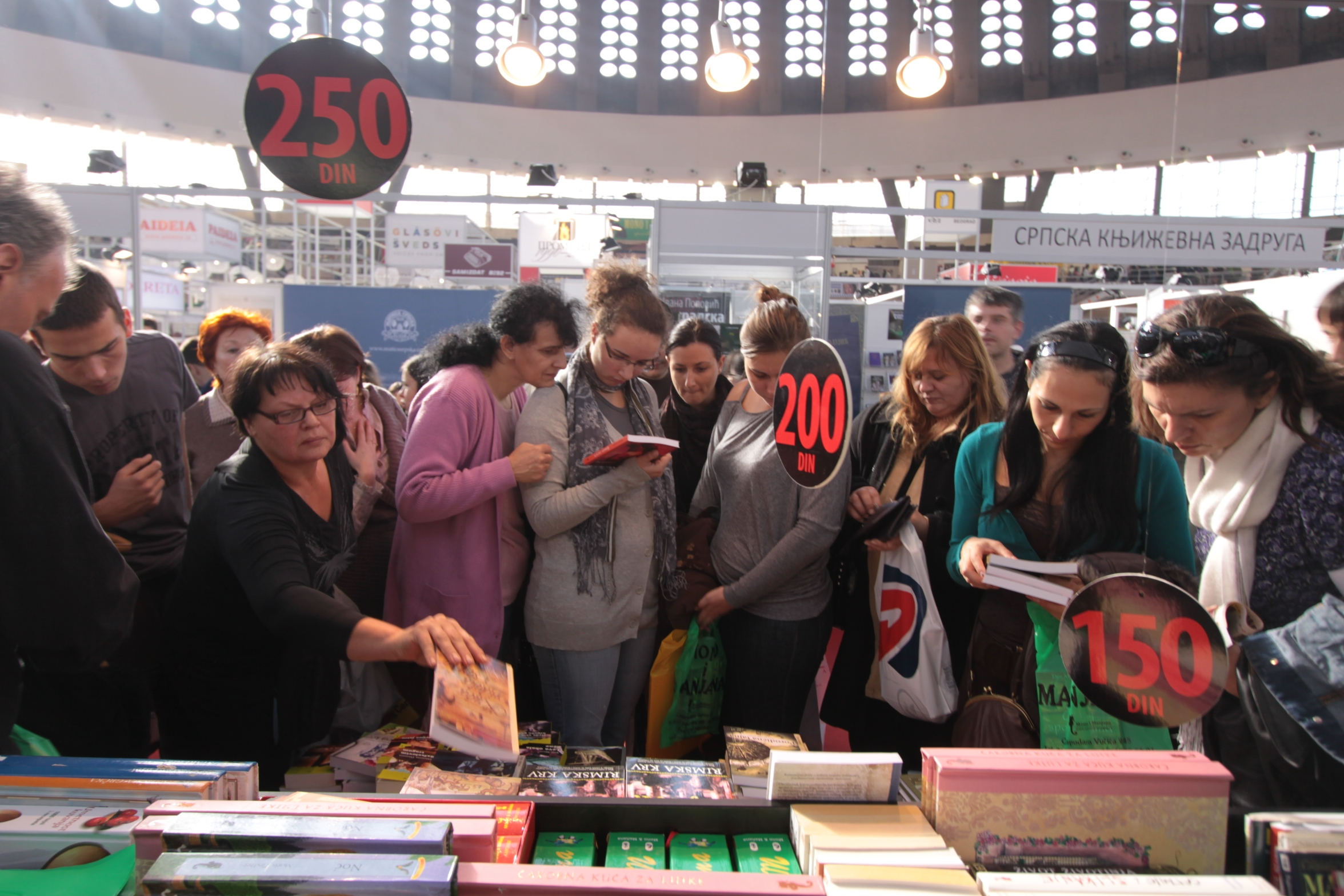
Customers looking at books

Several prizes are awarded during the Belgrade Book Fair: Publisher of the Year, Publishing Project of the Year, The Best Children’s Book, The Most Beautiful Book, The Most Beautiful Children’s Book, The Best Young Book Designer, The Best Publisher from the Diaspora, Special Recognition for the Contribution within Science. All publishers from Serbia and Diaspora being exhibitors at the Fair may compete for the prizes.

In addition to these prizes, the Dositej Obradović Prize has also been awarded since 2007, to an international publisher, for his continuous contribution to publishing and promotion of Serbian literature. So far, the Prize winners were the Austrian publisher Wieser Verlag from Klagenfurt (2007), French publisher Gaia Editions from Bordeaux (2008), Hungarian publisher Jelenkor from Pécs (2009), Italian publisher Zandonai from Rovereto (2010), Bulgarian publisher Siela from Sofia (2011) and Slovak publisher Kaligram from Bratislava (2012), Ukrainian publisher "Piramid" from Lviv (2013), Macedonian publisher "Ikona" from Skopje (2014), Spanish publisher "Acantilado" from Barselona (2015), Russian publisher "Book Center Rudomino" from Moscow (2016), Austrian publisher "Pauls Zsolnay" from Wienna (2017), Italian publisher "Lit Edizioni" from Rome (2018) and Greek publisher "Kostaniotis Editions" from Athens (2019).

== Features ==
=== Guest of Honor ===
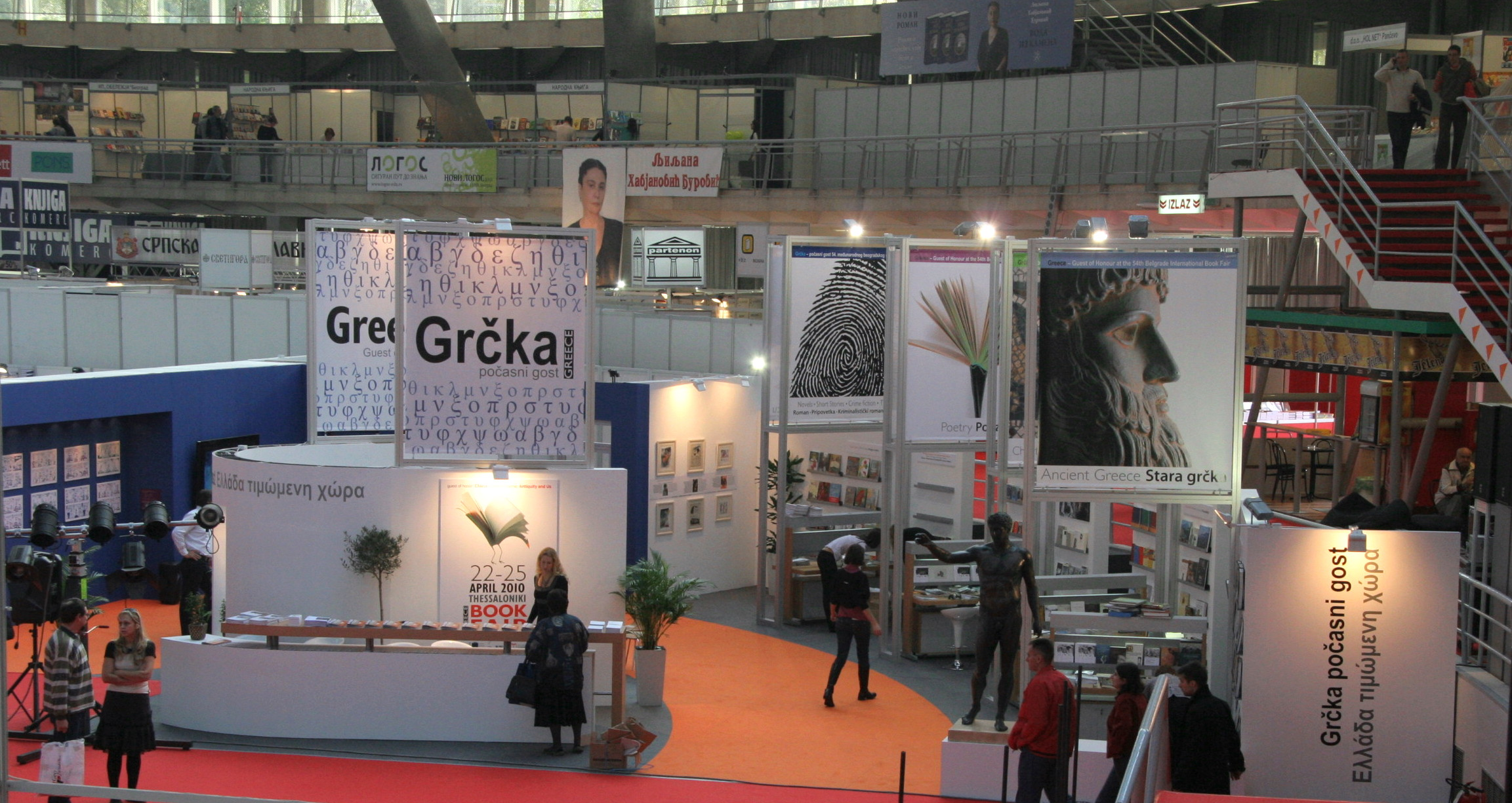
Greece – The Guest of Honor Country at the 2009 Book Fair

Since 2002, the fair nominates a Guest Of Honor, being a country with especially presented literature and publishing production.The Guest of Honor may feature at the fair the authors, translators, publishers, distributors, and others connected to the book.

The previous Guests of Honor were:

- 2002: Norway
- 2003: Canada
- 2004: France
- 2005: United Kingdom
- 2006: United States
- 2007: Italy
- 2008: Japan
- 2009: Greece
- 2010: Sweden
- 2011: Angola, Brazil, Portugal (Portuguese language literature)
- 2012: Hungary
- 2013: Poland
- 2014: China
- 2015: Russia
- 2016: Iran
- 2017: Germany, Austria, Switzerland, Liechtenstein (German language literature)
- 2018: Morocco
- 2019: Egypt
- 2022: Romania
- 2023: France
- 2024: Cuba
- 2025: Cyprus
- 2026: Tunisia
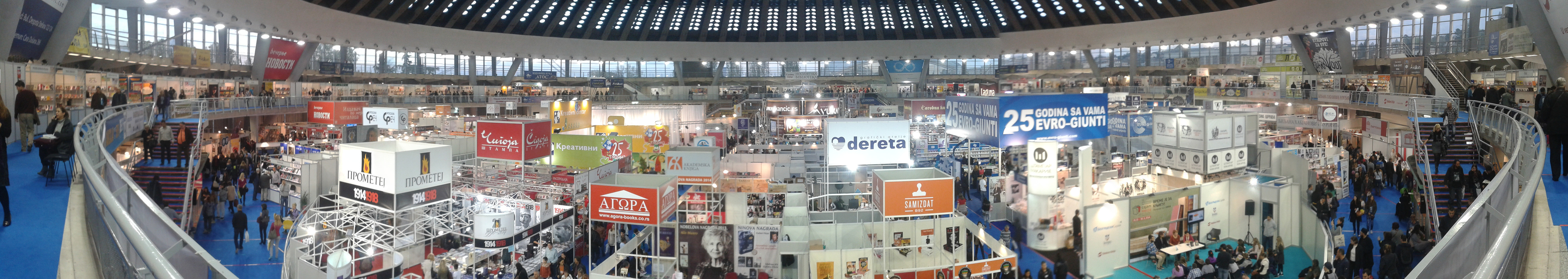
59th International Belgrade Book Fair

=== The School Day ===
The so-called School Day has been organized at the Fair since 2005, which encompasses organized visits of pupils, students, professors and school librarians, as well as many side event programs intended for them.

== Notable authors ==
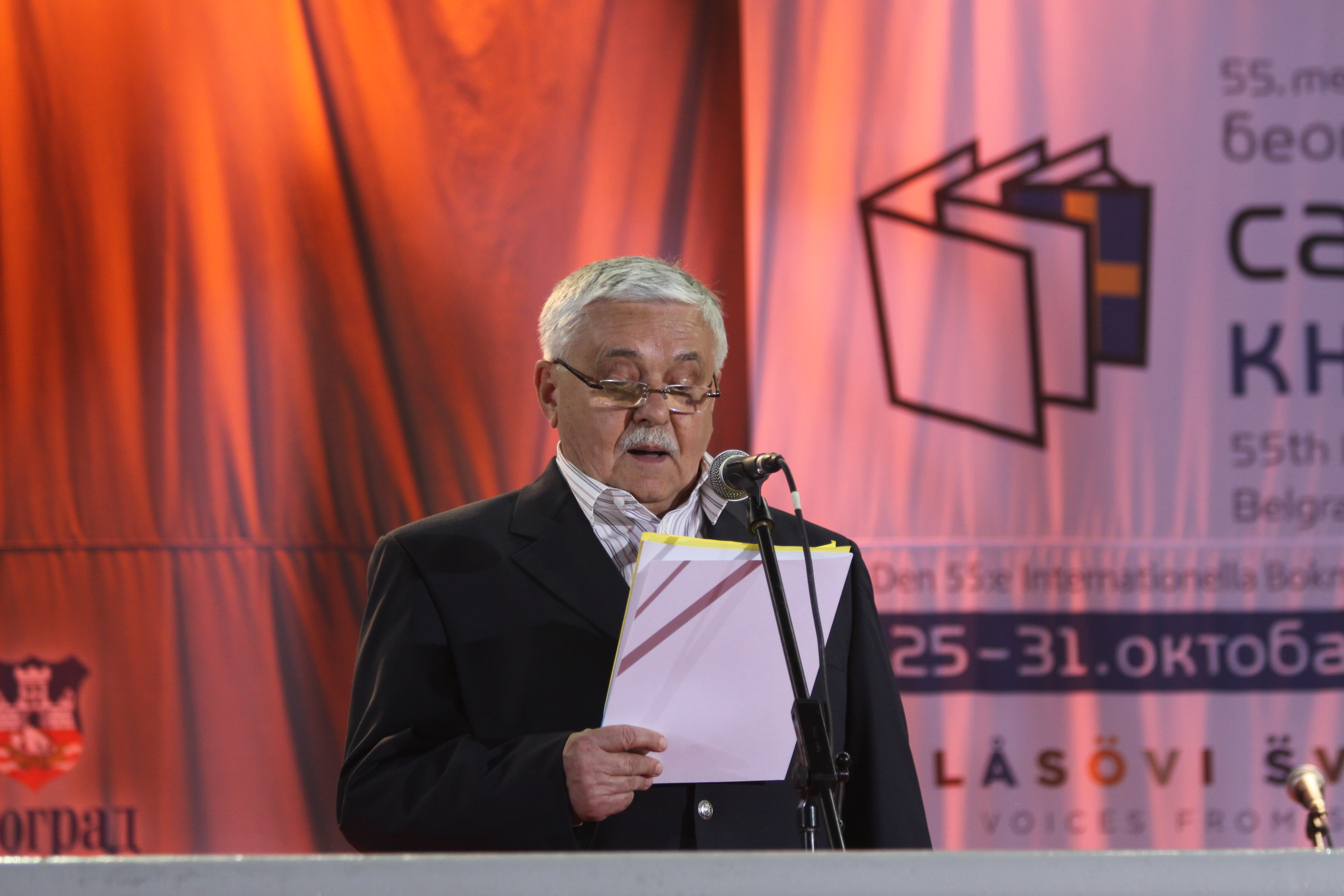
László Végel opens Book Fair 2010

The Book Fair includes all major authors from Serbia and many respected regional writers. The event is traditionally opened by renowned local authors. In the past, the Fair was festively opened by:

- 1970: Ivo Andrić
- 1989: Vesna Parun
- 1994: Alexander Zinoviev
- 1995: Takis Theodoropoulos
- 1997: Peter Handke
- 1998: Borys Oliynyk
- 1999: Alexander Zinoviev
- 2000: Dejan Medaković
- 2001: Svetlana Velmar Janković
- 2002:
- 2003: David Albahari
- 2004: Milovan Danojlić
- 2005: Ljubomir Simović
- 2006: Goran Petrović
- 2007: Dušan Kovačević
- 2008: Dragoslav Mihailović
- 2009: Dragan Velikić
- 2010: László Végel
- 2011:
- 2012: Radmila Lazić
- 2013: Ljubivoje Ršumović and Olga Tokarczuk
- 2014: Milosav Tešić and Liu Zhenyun
- 2015: Emir Kusturica and Natalya Narochnitskaya
- 2016: Ivan Negrišorac and Narges Abyar
- 2017:
- 2018: Matija Bećković
- 2019: Milovan Vitezović
- 2022: Dušan Kovačević
- 2023: Mathias Énard and Vladislav Bajac

The Fair is annually visited by at least one contemporary worldwide known writer. Among others, the Fair was visited by Alain Robbe-Grillet, Erica Jong, Natsuki Ikezawa, Claudio Magris, Lyudmila Ulitskaya, Charles Simic, Elizabeth Abbott, Tony Parsons, Peter Handke, Patrick Besson, Gish Jen, Naim Kattan, Geir Pollen, Eugene Vodolazkin, Erlend Loe, Zakhar Prilepin...
