= Lucinda Riley =

Northern Irish writer (1965–2021)

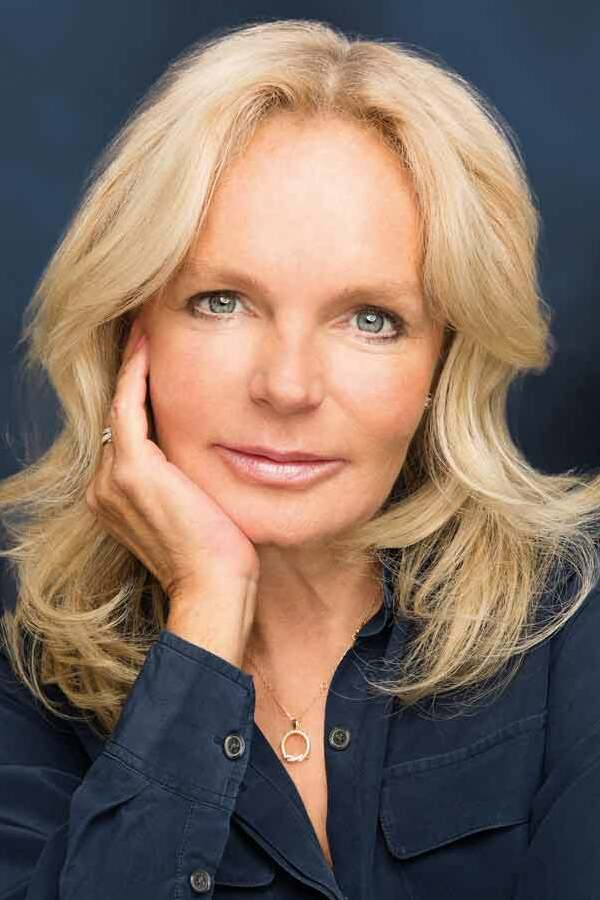
- Born: Lucinda Kate Edmonds; 16 February 1965; Lisburn, Northern Ireland
- Died: 11 June 2021 (aged 56)
- Education: Italia Conti Academy of Theatre Arts
- Occupation: Writer
- Spouse(s): Owen Whittaker (m. 1988; div. 1998) Stephen Riley (m. 2000)
- Children: 4 (Note: Four biological children and three stepchildren.)
- Writing career
- Language: English
- Period: 1992–2021
- Genres: Historical fiction; romantic fiction
- Notable work: The Seven Sisters series
- Website: lucindariley.co.uk/landing

Lucinda Kate Riley (née Edmonds; 16 February 1965 – 11 June 2021) was a Northern Irish author of popular historical fiction, formerly an actress and ballet dancer.

== Biography ==
Lucinda Edmonds was born in Lisburn and spent the first few years of her life in the village of Drumbeg, near Belfast, before moving to England. At age 14, she enrolled in the Italia Conti Academy of Theatre Arts in London to study theatre and ballet. At 16, she got her first major television role in the BBC adaptation of The Story of the Treasure Seekers, followed shortly afterwards by a guest role in Auf Wiedersehen Pet. She remained a working actress for the next seven years.

Her acting career was interrupted by a long bout of mononucleosis. This caused her to turn to writing, and her first novel Lovers and Players was published in 1992.

From 1988 to 1998, she was married to actor Owen Whittaker, with whom she had two children. From 2000 until her death, she was married to Stephen Riley, with whom she also had two children, as well as three stepchildren. She took a break from writing, returning to it in 2010; her subsequent novels were published under her married name.

In 2014, Riley published the Seven Sisters, the first novel of a series of the same name. This novel series made her a bestselling author, especially in Europe. The novels have been translated into several languages and have sold a combined total of more than 30 million books. In 2016, producer Raffaella De Laurentiis purchased the television rights to this series.

In 2019, Riley revealed to Norwegian newspaper Verdens Gang that she had oesophageal cancer. She continued to work, producing five novels during the four years of her illness, but was unable to complete the planned final eighth novel in her Seven Sisters series before her death on 11 June 2021. After her death, her son, Harry Whittaker, completed the series. Atlas: The Story of Pa Salt was posthumously released in May 2023.

== Filmography ==
- The Story of the Treasure Seekers (1982)
- Auf Wiedersehen, Pet (1983)
- Jumping the Queue (1989)

== Bibliography ==
As Lucinda Edmonds

- Lovers and Players (1992)
- Hidden Beauty (1993)
- Enchanted (1994)
- Not Quite an Angel (1995)
- Aria (1996)
- Losing You (1997)
- Playing With Fire (1998)
- Seeing Double (2000)

As Lucinda Riley

- The Orchid House (also known as Hothouse Flower) (2010)
- The Girl on the Cliff (2011)
- The Light Behind the Window (also known as The Lavender Garden) (2012)
- The Midnight Rose (2013)
- The Angel Tree (a rewrite of Not Quite an Angel) (2014)
- The Italian Girl (a rewrite of Aria) (2014)
- The Olive Tree (also published as Helena's Secret) (2016)
- The Love Letter (a rewrite of Seeing Double) (2018)
- The Butterfly Room (2019)
- The Murders at Fleat House (2022)
- The Hidden Girl (a rewrite of Hidden Beauty by Harry Whittaker) (2024)
- The Last Love Song (a rewrite of Losing You by Harry Whittaker) (2025)

=== The Seven Sisters series ===
- The Seven Sisters (2014)
- The Storm Sister (2015)
- The Shadow Sister (2016)
- The Pearl Sister (2017)
- The Moon Sister (2018)
- The Sun Sister (2019)
- The Missing Sister (2021)
- Atlas: The Story of Pa Salt (2023) (co-authored by Harry Whittaker)
