= Uroš Petrović =

Serbian writer (born 1967)

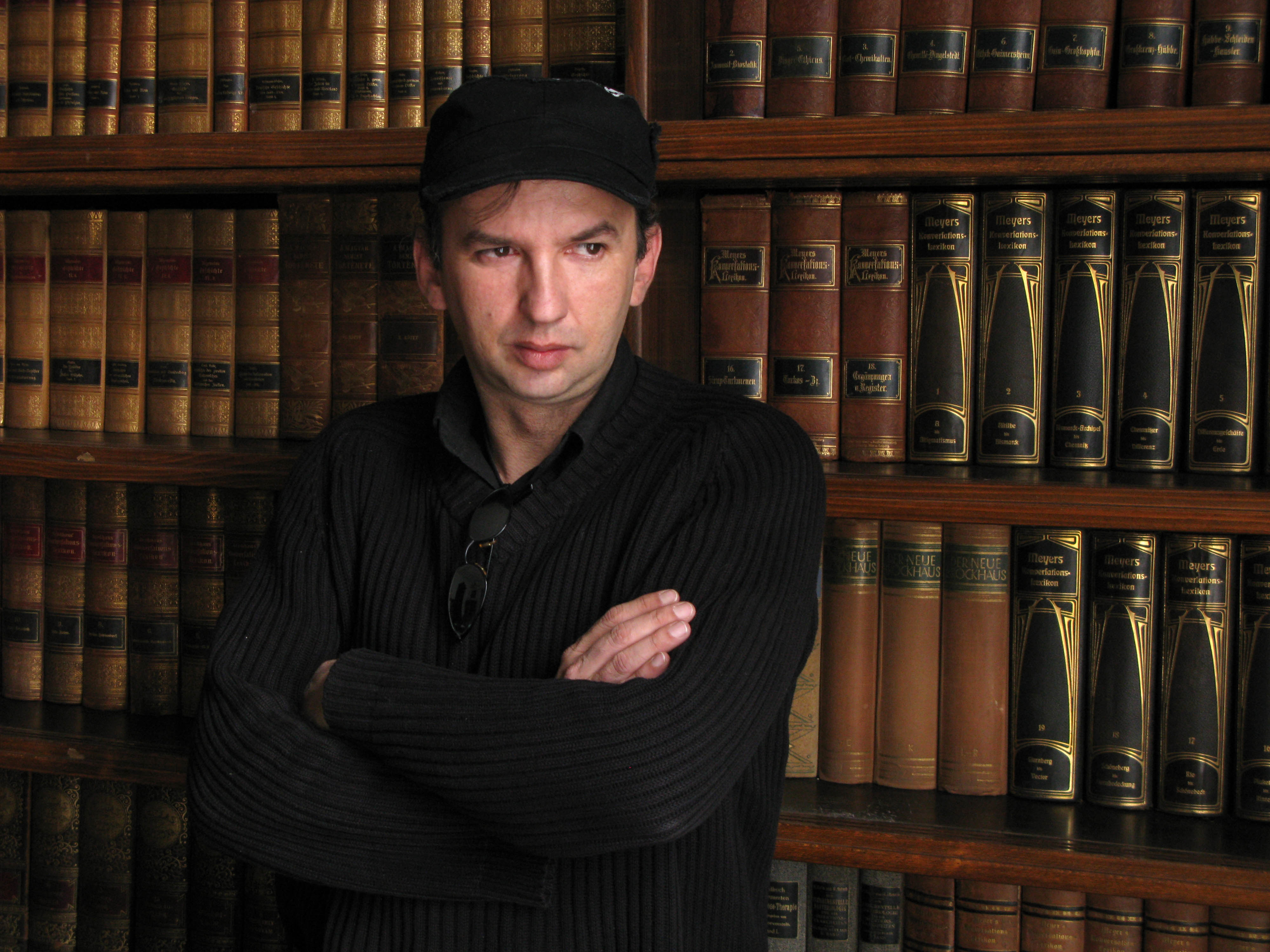
Uroš Petrović (2008)

Uroš Petrović (Serbian Cyrillic: Урош Петровић, born 8 April 1967) is a Serbian writer.

== Biography ==
Petrović is born in Gornji Milanovac, Socialist Republic of Serbia.

He is best known for his unusual novels, Riddle Tales I - V (Original title – Zagonetne priče) serial, Mysteries of Ginkgo Street (Original title – Misterije Ginkove ulice) and the first Serbian horror for children The Fifth Butterfly (Original title – Peti leptir). Dark Secrets of Ginkgo Street and Marta's Great Mysterious Adventure are also an innovative form - novels made of riddles. Petrovic spurred the nation to think in the “Labyrinth” quiz as the Creator of the Labyrinth character and the most serious obstacle for competitors, broadcast by Radio Television of Serbia. Awarded for books and photographs.

His novel was adapted into the film The Fifth Butterfly (2014).

He was the chairman of Serbian Mensa (2008-2013) and the Founder of Mensa World Photo Cup, co-author of NTC System of learning and author of Riddle questions concept.

== Bibliography ==
- Aven (2003, 2005)
- Stories From Other Side (2004)
- Riddle Tales (2006)
- Riddle Tales II (2006)
- The Fifth Butterfly (2007)
- Riddle Tales III (2007)
- Mysteries of Ginkgo Street (2008)
- Riddle Tales IV (2009)
- Dark Secrets of Ginkgo Street (2011)
- Riddle Tales V (2012)
- Children Of Bestragija (2013)
- Secret Skills of Marta Smart (2013)
- Marta's Great Mysterious Adventure (2014)
- Caravan of Wonders (2016)
- Marta Smart and Ferry of Riddles (2016)
- The Story of Yang (2017)
- Someone's Moved Into That Old Mansion (2018)
- Scary, scary book (2019)
- Quest of Riddles (2019)
- Camels Are Fat (2020)
- Quest of Riddles 2 (2021)
- Fairy Tales – The First Seven (2022)
- Fairy Tales – The Second Seven (2023)
- Fairy Tales – The Third Seven (2024)
- The Enchanted Device (2024)
- The Tale of Ledemon (2024)
- Midnight Circus (2025)
- Fairy Tales – The Fourth Seven (2025)
- The Wondrous Lake (2025)
- Belgrade Manga (2026)
- The Crystal Fairy Tale (2026)
- Train Your Brain To Roar! (2026)
- Fairy Tales - The Fifth Seven (2026)

== Original Board Games ==
- Marta's Mysterious Box 2016 Good Toy Award by Friends of Children of Serbia
- Mysterious Dominoes 2017
- Dum Dum Dum 2018 Good Toy Award by Friends of Children of Serbia
- Fairy Tale Workshop - Castle 2020 Grand Prix for a toy with a purpose
- Fairy Tale Workshop - Waterfall 2020 Grand Prix for a toy with a purpose
- Fairy Tale Workshop - Rainbow 2020 Grand Prix for a toy with a purpose
- Fairy Tale Balance Game 2021 Good Toy Award by Friends of Children of Serbia Grand Prix for a toy with a purpose

== Awards ==
- ATIPIKA AWARD 2005 First Prize and The best author of unusual literature
- NEVEN AWARD 2006 for Riddle Tales and Riddle Tales II
- DOSITEJ AWARD 2006 for Riddle Tales and Riddle Tales II
- RADE OBRENOVIC AWARD 2007 for the best novel for children The Fifth Butterfly
- FEATHER OF DOSITEJ AWARD 2007 for the best book Riddle Tales III
- GORDANA BRAJOVIC AWARD 2008 for the best book Mysteries of Ginkgo Street
- NEVEN AWARD 2008 for the best book of popular science Mysteries of Ginkgo Street
- ESTROVERSO AWARD 2009 for the best translation to Italian language Mysteries of Ginkgo Street, translated by Brunella Anastasi and Valentina Sileo
- GOLDEN BADGE 2009 of Cultural and Educational Community of Serbia for contribution to national culture
- ZMAJ CHILDREN GAMES AWARD 2011 for outstanding contribution to contemporary expression in literature for children
- FEATHER OF DOSITEJ AWARD 2011 for the best book Dark Secrets of Ginkgo Street
- FEATHER OF DOSITEJ AWARD 2012 for the best book Riddle Tales V
- RADE OBRENOVIC AWARD 2013 for the best novel for children Children of Bestragija
- PLAVI CUPERAK 2017 for the best book Caravan of Wonders
- NEVEN AWARD 2017 for the best book Caravan of Wonders
- SILVER GASHA'S FEATHER AWARD International Festival of Humor for Children 2018 for the most humorous book The Story of Yang
- JEDI KNIGHT Džedajkon 2018 Honorific for fantasy literature and social activism
- KNIGHT OF SERBIA 2021 kulturne svečanosti
- THE BEST BOOK FOR CHILDREN of International Book Fair Novi Sad 2023 for Fairy Tales - The First Seven
- THE PRINCE OF THE CHILDREN'S KINGDOM for the entire work and contribution to literature, Banjaluka 2023
- POVELJA PUTIC for the entire work, Savino Selo 2023
- ZMAJ CHILDREN GAMES AWARD ZMAJ'S CANE 2024
- GOLDEN POPPY – an international festival award for overall contribution to children's literature 2026
