= Prlita =

- Village
- Location within Serbia
- Coordinates: 43°50′58″N 22°21′00″E
- Country: Serbia
- District: Zaječar District
- Municipality: Zaječar

Population (2002)
  - Total: 142
- Time zone: UTC+1 (CET)
  - Summer (DST): UTC+2 (CEST)

Prlita is a village in the municipality of Zaječar, Serbia. According to the 2002 census, the village has a population of 142 people.
