= Nikola Malović =

Serbian writer

Malović Nikola
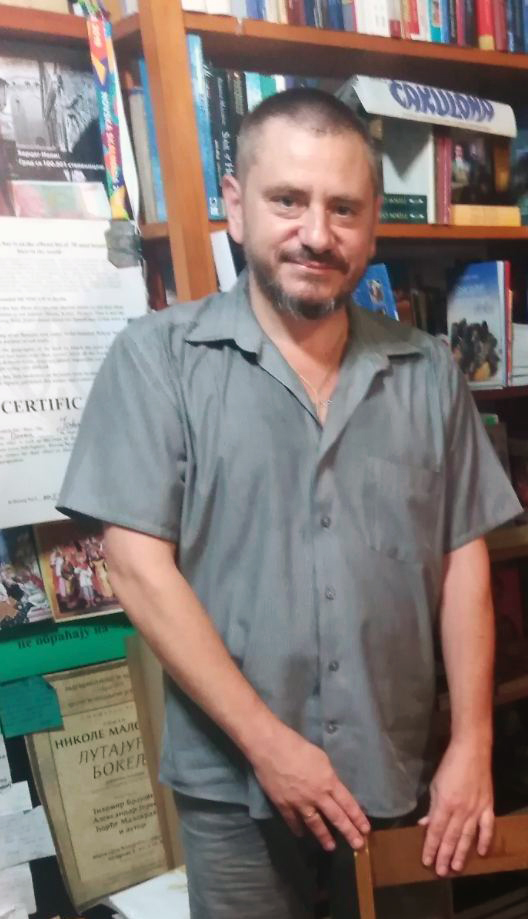
- Born: July 8, 1970 (age 56); Kotor, Yugoslavia
- Education: Belgrade University
- Occupations: Novelist, Playwright
- Writing career
- Language: Serbian
- Period: 1998–present
- Genres: drama, romance

Nikola Malović (Serbian Cyrillic: Никола Маловић; born July 8, 1970) is a Serbian prose and drama writer. He is a member of the Serbian Literary Society.

Based in Herceg Novi, Bay of Kotor, Montenegro.

His books have been translated into English, Russian, Polish and Bulgarian.

== Works ==
- Poslednja decenija (The last decade) (1998)
- Kapetan Vizin – 360 stepeni oko Boke (Capt. Vizin) (2002)
- Peraški goblen (Perast needlepoint) (2003)
- Lutajući Bokelj (Wandering man from the Bay of Kotor) (2007)
- Prugastoplave storije (Blue-stripped stories) (2010)
- Jedro nade (2014)
- Galeb koji se smeje : Roman za decu i odrasle (2019)
