= Viktor Lazić =

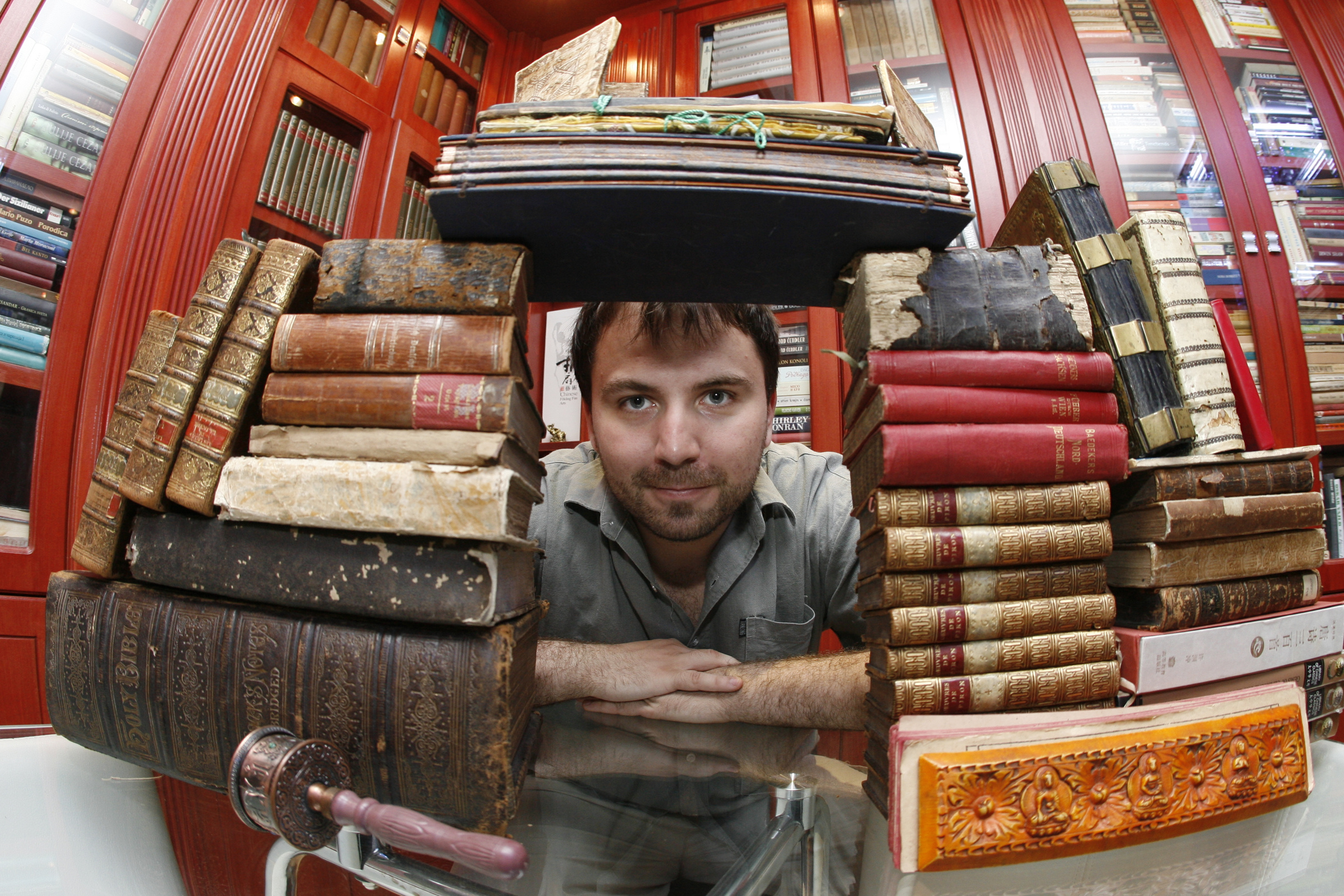
Viktor Lazić among books in the Museum of Book and Travel.

Viktor Lazić (24 January 1985) is a Serbian writer, traveller and lawyer. He is founder and president of the Society for Culture, Art and International Cooperation Adligat.

== Biography ==
Lazić was born in 1985 in Belgrade. He was the honors student of the Law High School "9. May" in Belgrade and graduated from the Faculty of Law of the University of Belgrade. He is currently working on a doctorate degree in the field of Chinese law with subject "Confucianism and Legalism as the dominant schools of Chinese law".

Lazić is authorized translator, holder of a tour guide license, Ambassador of the Serbian Bibliophilic Society, was associate of the Geographical Institute "Jovan Cvijić" of Serbian Academy of Science and Arts (2009–2011), philatelist and numismatist. He is founder and president of the Society for Culture, Art and International Cooperation "Adligat", CEO of Library Lazic (since 1882), Book and Travel Museum and Museum of Serbian Literature within this Association.

Viktor Lazic is the heir of two-hundred-year-long tradition of a family library that operated in Vojvodina from 1882 until 1977. During his travels, he spends most of his resources on finding new books and artifacts for this library and Book and Travel Museum in Belgrade.

He is the recipient of a number of awards and certificates. He was the recipient of the Honorary citizen of Voždovac award in 2019 and the Benefactor award in 2020. He is a member of the Association of Writers of Serbia.

He speaks English, Russian and German, in addition to his native Serbian.

== Travel and travel books ==
Lazic is a travel writer for the biggest Serbian publishing house "Laguna". He has visited 100 countries on six continents. He spent ten years travelling the world with a minimum of financial resources. He became known for driving around the globe in an old Russian Lada Niva.

His greatest journey lasted 421 days during 2009/2010, which is described in the book "The Great Adventure." During the trip, he regularly wrote for the daily newspapers Press from Belgrade. He started that trip from Kosovo, Dečani monastery. He toured much of Europe in a Jeep and reached the northernmost point of the European continent, North Cape, from where he proceeded to Russia. Without an accurate plan of movement, he visited thousands of cities, towns and villages. In October 2009. he reached the border of North Korea where the journey continued by other means of transport through Asia and Australia. He drove back to Serbia from Vladivostok, crossing alone Gobi desert, where he faced the biggest car failure.

In July 2011 he started five-month journey around the shores of the Black Sea. He visited rarely visited regions of Southeast Turkey and Iraq, continuing to Georgia, Azerbaijan and Armenia. On the same journey, he also passed through Russia, Ukraine, Moldova (including Transnistria) and Romania.

The travel novels of Viktor Lazić are known to describe areas «off the beaten track»: he discovers new travel destinations, culture and places of natural beauty that known to few people. In his travel novels, the most important is contact with residents, explaining different world views and different ways of life. Particular media attention in the Balkans was drawn by his description of the life of pirates in Malacca Straits, life of believers of sects of the self-proclaimed Jesus, Vizarion, in Siberia, life of ex-cannibal tribes and matriarchal tribes in Indonesia.

== Works ==
- Goethe – poetry and truth, Stručna knjiga, Belgrade, Law High School «9. may», Belgrade, 2003
- Wondering the Land of Smiles, Bigraf Plus, Belgrade, 2006 with CD
- Wondering the Land of Smiles (II edition), Treći Trg, Belgrade, 2008
- Wondering the Land of Smiles (III edition), Prosveta, Belgrade, 2012
- Great Adventure, Press Publishing Group, Belgrade, 2010
- In the heart of Sumatra, Laguna, Belgrade, 2011
- In the heart of Sumatra (II edition), Laguna, Belgrade, 2012
- On the doors of the East, Laguna, Belgrade, 2015
- Šta je ljubav?, Savremenik, Belgrade, 2017
- Kenija: damari divljine, Laguna, Belgrade, 2024
- Dobre duše Sudana, Laguna, Belgrade, 2025
