= Radmila Lazić =

Serbian poet and writer

Radmila Lazić (born 1949) is a Serbian poet, writer, and activist. She has published a number of books, including poetry, essays, and short prose, and is a laureate of the highest Serbian poetry prizes.

== Life and Work ==
Lazić was born in Kruševac and has lived in Belgrade since 1960.

Her poetry collections include To je to (1974), Pravo stanje stvari (1978), Podela uloga (1981), Noćni razgovori (1986), Istorija melanholije (1993), Priče i druge pesme (1998), Iz anamneze (2000), Doroti Parker bluz (2003), Zimogrozica (2005), In vivo (2007), Magnolija nam cveta itd. (2009), Crna knjiga (2014), Hulim i potpisujem (2022), Život posle života (2024).

She is represented in numerous selections and anthologies of Serbian poetry in the country and abroad. Her poems have been translated into English, German, Spanish, Italian, Hungarian, Norwegian, Japanese, Polish, and Macedonian. A Wake for the Living, her first collection of poetry translated to English by Charles Simic, was published in 2003 by Graywolf Press.

Lazić is the author of essay collections Mesto žudnje (2005) and Misliti sebe (2012), and short prose Ugrizi život (2017). She edited the magazine for women literature Pro Femina.

Radmila Lazić opened the Belgrade Book Fair in 2012.

== Style ==
According to the Pulitzer-Prize winning poet Charles Simic, Lazić's poetry is characterized by uncommon eloquence and unexpected imaginative turns. Lazić is "both out to break taboos and to keep the tradition of women's oral poetry going".

In the statement by the Desanka Maksimović Prize Committee, Lazić’s poetry is distinguished by exceptional openness and courage. "She tries to determine the true state of affairs, and she confronts this true state of affairs openly, without mitigation or embellishment."

== Awards ==
Lazić’s awards include:

- Milan Rakić Award (1981)
- Đura Jakšić Award (2000)
- Desanka Maksimović Prize (2003)
- Vasko Popa Award (2006)
- Jefimijin vez (2008)
- Laza Kostić Award (2010)
- Milica Stojadinović-Srpkinja Award (2014)
